= Soviet invasion of Azerbaijan =

Part of the Russian Civil War in 1920

Red Army invasion of Azerbaijan
- Part of Armenian–Azerbaijani War
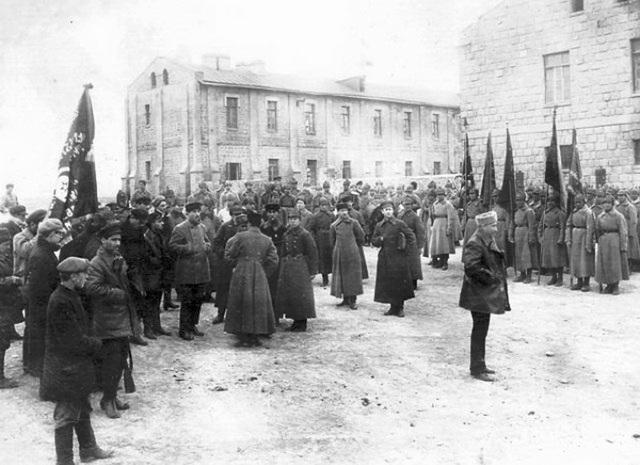
- Red Army in Baku, May 1920
Date	27 April – 12 May 1920 (2 weeks and 1 day)
Location	Transcaucasia
Result	Soviet victory: Overthrow of the ADR government; Establishment of the Azerbaijan SSR

Belligerents
Russian SFSR (Azerbaijan Soviet Socialist Republic) Azerbaijani Bolsheviks	Azerbaijan

Commanders and leaders
(Russian Soviet Federative Socialist Republic) Mikhail Tukhachevsky (Russian Soviet Federative Socialist Republic) Mikhail Levandovsky (Russian Soviet Federative Socialist Republic) Mikhail Yefremov (Russian Soviet Federative Socialist Republic) Anastas Mikoyan (Azerbaijan Soviet Socialist Republic) Gazanfar Musabekov (Azerbaijan Soviet Socialist Republic) Nariman Narimanov (Azerbaijan Soviet Socialist Republic) Chingiz Ildyrym	Mammad H. Hajinski; Samad Mehmandarov; Abdulhamid Gaytabashi; Aliagha Shikhlinski

The Red Army invasion of Azerbaijan, also known as the Sovietization or Soviet invasion of Azerbaijan, took place in April 1920. It was a military campaign conducted by the 11th Army of the Soviet Russia aimed at installing a Soviet government in the Azerbaijan Democratic Republic. The invasion coincided with an anti-government insurrection organized by local Azerbaijani Bolsheviks in the capital city of Baku. As a result, the Azerbaijan Democratic Republic was dissolved, and the Azerbaijan Soviet Socialist Republic was established.

During 1919–1920, Azerbaijan experienced severe political and socio-economic crises, with volatile internal conditions. Armed conflicts occurred between various political and social factions across the country. Since the collapse of Republican Power in 1918, underground organizations consisting of different political parties and socialist groups were active. These factions united with the AC(b)P in February 1920 to coordinate their political objectives.

In April 1920, the 11th Red Army, having defeated the Volunteer Army in the North Caucasus, approached Azerbaijan's borders. Azerbaijani Bolsheviks prepared for armed uprisings scheduled for the night of 26–27 April. Alongside the uprisings in Baku, several Soviet armored trains crossed into Azerbaijan, conducting successful deep raids behind Azerbaijani lines.

After securing key strategic locations in the capital, the Bolsheviks issued an ultimatum to the Azerbaijani government and parliament, demanding the transfer of power. In an emergency session, the parliament voted to hand over power to the Azerbaijani Communist Party. With the support of the 11th Red Army entering the country, the new government quickly brought the rest of Azerbaijan under its control. The primary outcome was the establishment of Soviet rule under the Communist Party, and the proclamation of the Azerbaijan Soviet Socialist Republic. The Azerbaijan SSR functioned as a nominally independent state until 1922.

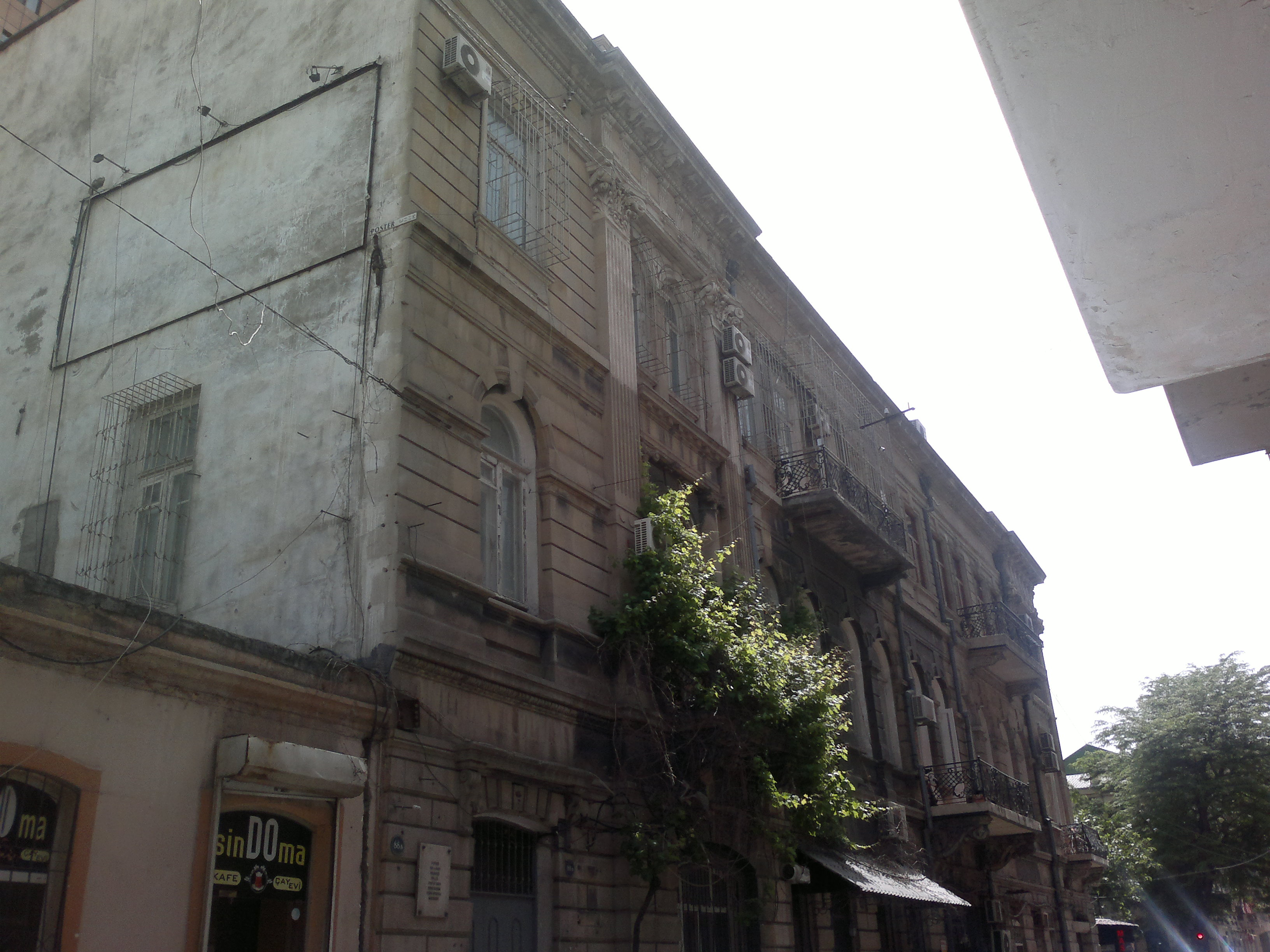
The building where the secret meeting of the Caucasian Regional Committee of the Russian Communist Party was held in May 1919. Located at 88a, modern-day Hazi Aslanov Street, the building bears a plaque commemorating its historical significance.

== Background ==
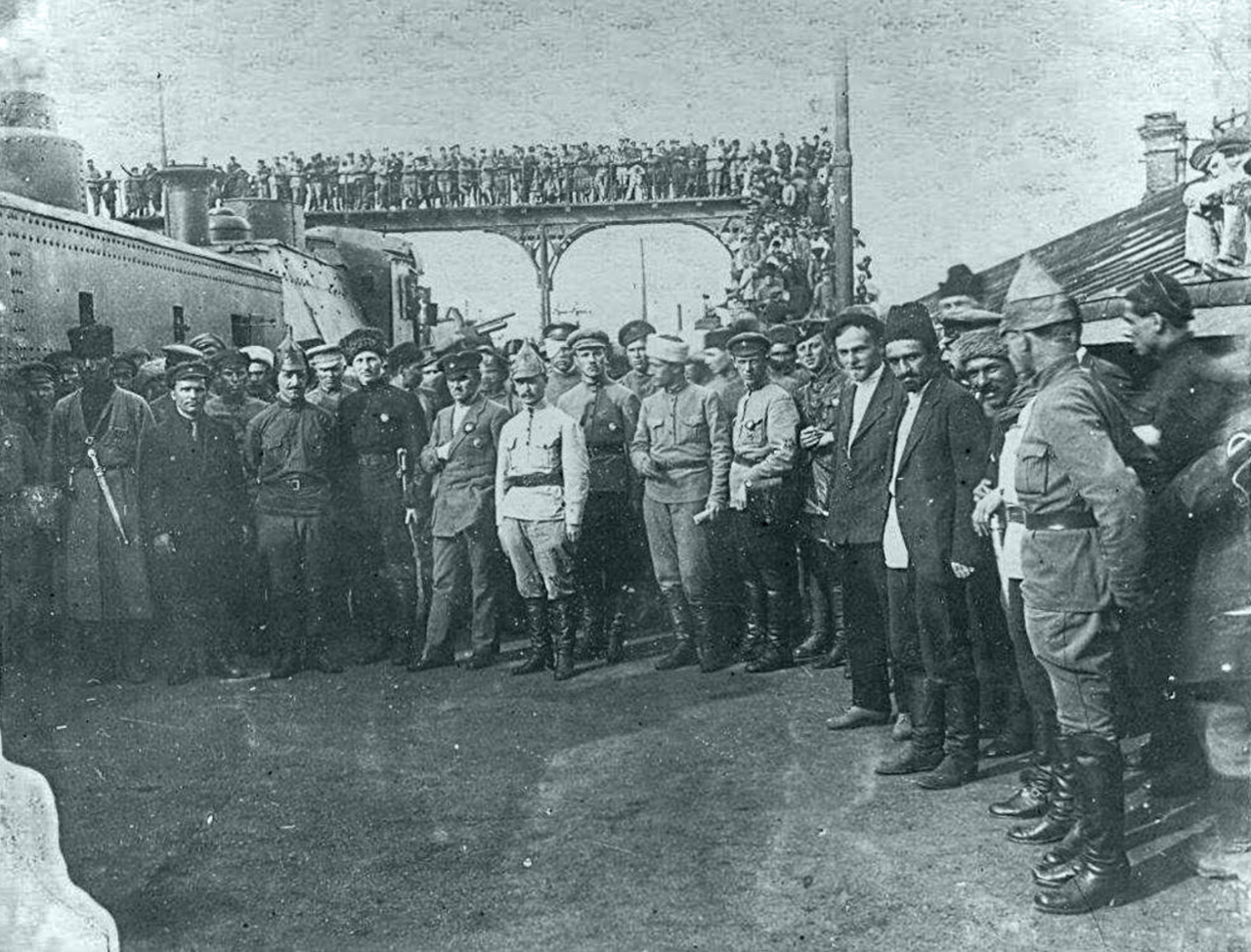
Sergey Kirov, Anastas Mikoyan, Sergo Ordzhonikidze, and Mikhail Levandovsky among Red Army soldiers in Baku

=== The revolutionary movement in Azerbaijan after 1918 ===
In July 1918, Soviet power in Baku was overthrown, and in September, following its capture by the Caucasian Islamic Army, the city became the capital of the Azerbaijan Democratic Republic. However, various parties aligned with Bolshevik ideology and socialist-oriented organizations such as "Hummat" and "Adalat" continued to operate clandestinely. Initially, these groups were significantly weakened. During the August–September 1918 capture of Baku, 100 members of "Adalat" were killed, and 95 were captured; the survivors and escapees resorted to underground activities. The "Hummat" organization, almost entirely dismantled after the fall of Soviet power, began to reorganize only at the end of 1918.

Unlike the Bolshevik faction of "Hummat," its democratic wing participated in the Declaration of Independence of Azerbaijan and established its own faction within the National Council. Representatives of this faction (Samad aga Agamalioglu, Aliheydar Garayev, Ahmad bey Pepinov, Gasim Jamalbeyov, Ibrahim Abilov, Akbar agha Sheykhulislamov) later joined the Socialist faction in Azerbaijan's first parliament, which began functioning in December 1918. Among these deputies, Samad aga Agamalioglu and Aliheydar Garayev played significant roles. Some members of the Socialist "Hummat" later joined the Bolsheviks in 1920 and became active supporters of the establishment of Soviet power in the country.

The formation of the Left SR (Socialist-Revolutionary) Party in Azerbaijan, including members such as Ruhulla Akhundov, Ali Bayramov, and Habib Jabiyev, occurred in November 1918 in alliance with the Bolsheviks. On the national question, they differed from the Russian Left SRs, advocating for the establishment and recognition of Azerbaijan as an independent Soviet republic. By the spring of 1919, most members of the Azerbaijani Left SR organization had merged with "Hummat".

In December 1918, labor organizations (factory and industrial committees) united to form the Baku Workers' Conference, which soon became the highest permanent representative body of Baku workers. Anastas Mikoyan described it as "a kind of Soviet," while Sergey Kirov referred to it as a "workers' parliament." Within this body, intense struggles unfolded between Bolsheviks on one side and Mensheviks and SRs on the other. According to the Mensheviks and SRs, the authority of the Workers' Conference should be limited to addressing workers' wages and living conditions, with political struggles confined to parliament. Later, the Bolsheviks proposed the establishment of a Soviet of Workers', Soldiers', and Peasants' Deputies, a proposal approved at the Workers' Conference on 22 January 1919. By mid-March, the leadership of the Workers' Conference had effectively fallen into the hands of the Bolsheviks, who marginalized the Mensheviks and SRs, turning it into the supreme political body of Baku workers.

During the existence of the Azerbaijan Democratic Republic, the Bolsheviks began publishing several newspapers. The following were published in Azerbaijani and Russian: "Nabat", "Füqəra Sədası", "Kommunist", "Molot", "Proletari", "Raboçiy Put", "Bednota", "Azərbaycan Füqərası", "Bakı Fəhlə Konfransının Xəbərləri", "Zəhmət Sədası", "Hürriyyət", "Həqq", "Raboçaya Pravda", and "Novıy Mir". On 30 July 1919, the Bolsheviks' newspaper "Bakı Fəhlə Konfransının Xəbərləri" ("News of Baku Workers' Conference"), edited by Menshevik Aliheydar Garayev, became the first to publish a translation of the new program of the Russian Communist Party (Bolsheviks) into Azerbaijani. However, the program could not be fully published (only five issues were released) as the government shut down the newspaper. The Bolsheviks later published the program separately as a brochure. As Nariman Narimanov later noted, copies of these newspapers even reached Moscow, and Lenin himself was informed about them.

Several revolutionary-minded individuals, including sympathizers of the Bolsheviks, worked within government institutions and law enforcement agencies. For instance, Chingiz Ildirim, with the support of deputy Garayev, initially became a member of the council under the Karabakh General-Governorship, later serving as the deputy head of Baku Port and simultaneously as deputy head of the naval base. Regarding revolutionary activities in military units and the navy, Mirza Davud Huseynov wrote:

In the Baku garrison, we had cells in virtually every military unit...The same was true for the navy... At that time, comrade Ildırım was an assistant to the head of Baku Port, and we operated through him.

Nariman Narimanov's cousin, Muzaffar Narimanov, a member of "Hummat," served in the Azerbaijani army, later joining the Musavat counterintelligence service, and subsequently worked in the Ministry of Labor's conflict department. The wife of RCP(b) member Ali Bayramov, Jeyran Bayramova, worked as a secretary in the legislative department of the Azerbaijani parliament. Another RKP(b) member, Leonid Beriya, was employed in the "Organization for Combating Counter-Revolution" operating within Azerbaijan's Ministry of War.

=== The Slogan of "Independent Soviet Azerbaijan" ===
During a conversation in the autumn of 1918 with Dadash Bunyadzade, a member of "Hummat", V.I. Lenin remarked:

The loss of Stepan [Shaumyan] and the 26 Commissars should not halt the work we have begun. It is necessary to regroup, enlighten, and liberate the Azerbaijani workers and peasants who have been deceived by the Mensheviks and Socialist Revolutionaries.

At that time, Bunyadzade informed Lenin that Azerbaijani communists held differing views regarding the future state structure of Azerbaijan:

When Ilyich was informed that there were two currents in Azerbaijan—one advocating for the establishment of an independent socialist Soviet republic after the liberation of Baku and Azerbaijan, and another proposing that no republic be created, instead dividing Azerbaijan into provinces to be annexed to the RSFSR—he expressed his view unequivocally. He stated that the idea of creating an independent republic was correct, while the second notion amounted to colonialism and, indeed, folly.

On 2 May 1919, the All-Baku Party Conference adopted the slogan of "Independent Soviet Azerbaijan." During the conference of Transcaucasian party organizations held in Baku on 7–8 May, the Baku party organization proposed this slogan. However, the conference, particularly members of the Caucasus Bureau of the Russian Communist Party (Bolsheviks) in Tiflis, rejected it. Despite this, on 19 July, a joint meeting of the Politburo and Organizational Bureau of the Central Committee of the RCP(b) decided to recognize Azerbaijan as an independent Soviet republic in the future. The Bolshevik newspaper "Füqəra Sədası" reported on 17 August that the idea of establishing the Azerbaijani Soviet Republic had been approved by V.I. Lenin. On 20 August, Y.D. Stasova, Secretary of the Central Committee of the RCP(b), wrote to the Caucasus Regional Committee, stating:

We consider the proclamation of an independent Soviet Republic of Azerbaijan entirely appropriate.

On 22 May 1919, Anastas Mikoyan wrote to Lenin:

In Azerbaijan, there are greater oil resources, sharper social contradictions, more fertile grounds for a class-based upheaval, and more discontent and hatred against the existing government. Independence [of Azerbaijan Democratic Republic] is merely an illusion... To ensure the success of the revolutionary movement, remove national barriers on the path to revolution, and win the trust of the Muslim laboring masses in us, the internationalists, the Baku organization has recognized the Independent Soviet Azerbaijan as an entity with close political and economic ties to Soviet Russia. This slogan is highly popular, capable of uniting all Muslim laborers around it and mobilizing them for an uprising.

According to the memoirs of Nariman Narimanov and Sergey Mironovich Kirov, Lenin believed that Soviet Azerbaijan should serve as a model for the peoples of the East.

== Domestic political situation in Azerbaijan ==
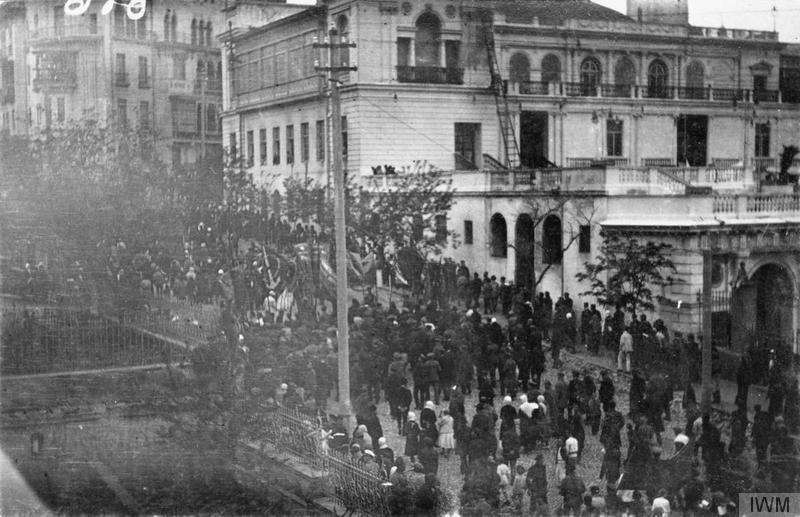
Protests in Baku in June 1919. The photo was taken by Robert Cotton Money, who would later become a Major General in the United Kingdom Army.

=== Socio-economic environment ===
At the end of 1919 and the beginning of 1920, Azerbaijan was engulfed in a deep political and socio-economic crisis. The economic downturn caused by World War I, compounded by the severance of economic ties with Russia, had left the republic in a dire situation. Peasant uprisings broke out in several regions, the agricultural economy was collapsing, and the oil industry was in a catastrophic state.

Compared to 1913, by early 1920, oil production had declined to only 39% and refining to 34.5% of the previous levels. Of the 40 existing oil refineries in the country, only 18 were operational. The damage inflicted on the oil industry by foreign intervention was estimated at 750 million gold rubles. At the second congress of the Musavat Party, the party's leader, Mahammad Amin Rasulzade, remarked on the oil crisis, noting that workers in the oil fields were being maintained at the state's expense, while oil industrialists were considering halting operations entirely. At the time, the oil fields were described by the Communist newspaper as a "graveyard."

By 1920, the total area of cultivated agricultural land had decreased by 40% compared to the pre-war period. Cotton cultivation had dropped by 99%, vineyards by 30%, and livestock production had declined by 60-70%. Irrigation systems were in disrepair, resulting in cotton cultivation amounting to only 2.3% of pre-war levels.

The instability in Azerbaijan was not solely due to the conflict between the wealthy and the poor, which exacerbated social tensions. The struggle of the working class to improve their economic and social conditions also contributed to the crisis. By September 1919, the number of unemployed in Baku had reached 30,000, and Iranian oil drillers were returning to their homeland. In October of the same year, the real wages of Baku oil workers were only 18% of their 1914 levels. Simultaneously, the prices of goods had soared dramatically. For example, in the second half of 1919, the price of bread increased by over 100%, meat by 56%, fish by 150%, eggs by 96%, butter by 200%, underwear by 100%, wool fabrics by 233%, and footwear by 135%. The economic blockade imposed by General A. I. Denikin's Volunteer Army in late 1919 further deepened the food crisis. Denikin sought to prevent Georgia and Azerbaijan from purchasing food from territories liberated from Bolshevik control, accusing them of acting "contrary to Russian state interests."

Kazimzadeh, a member of the Musavat Party in parliament, lamented the intolerable living conditions in the capital, where all workers’ organizations had been disbanded. Starving workers were forced to labor for 17–18 hours a day instead of the standard 8 and could be dismissed at any time. On 22 March 1920, the Minister of Internal Affairs, Mustafa Bey Vekilov, officially stated:

The republic's supreme executive authority had no intention of intervening in the struggle to improve the economic and legal conditions of the working class but declared its determination to suppress any actions directed against the state by all possible means.

In addition, armed clashes between Armenians and Azerbaijanis over disputed territories between Azerbaijan and Armenia were ongoing. Azerbaijan faced a significant influx of refugees, who brought with them epidemics and famine to the country's rural districts. Lacking material and financial resources, the Musavat government was unable to cope with the problems of refugees and widespread poverty.

=== Armed conflicts in uezds ===
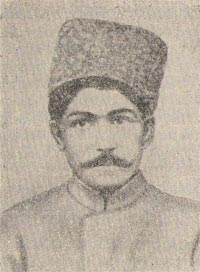
Gatir Mammad, the leader of the main peasant movement in the Ganja province, was considered a national hero by the Azerbaijani Soviet Encyclopedia.

In rural areas, peasants were seizing the estates of landowners, sometimes even organizing armed attacks to do so. One of the main concerns of the Azerbaijan Democratic Republic (ADR) government in 1919 was such attacks in the Ganja district, a region particularly distinguished by the prevalence of large estates (latifundia). A telegram from Colonel Vekilov, the governor of Yelizavetpol Governorate, to the Ministry of Internal Affairs of the ADR noted that propaganda was spreading among the "dark forces" of the governorate, claiming that the ADR government was composed of beys and aghas and served only their interests and welfare. Certain actions of the government inadvertently reinforced this perception. For instance, the Minister of Internal Affairs, Nasib bey Yusifbeyli, instructed Governor Khosrov bey Sultanov in a telegram to preserve the current land situation until the implementation of new agrarian reforms. At the same time, a letter from peasants alleged that the governor and local administrative officials were overtly protecting the beys of Oksuzlu village. Elsewhere, protests and discontent over land issues continued to grow.

In a context of political power vacuums, armed groups and bandit formations began to emerge locally. These groups, which gained significant strength in regions like Ganja, Gazakh, Lankaran, Nukha, and Shamkir during 1918–1919, had a fluid social composition. Their ranks often included fugitive criminals, landless peasants, impoverished nomads, refugees from Karabakh and Nakhchivan, and deserters from the Azerbaijani army. For example, in the village of Kizilhajili, an armed group led by a former convict, Mashadi Gadir, arose following a conflict between him and the village administrator. This group, consisting mainly of deserters, fugitive thieves, and Armenians, effectively controlled the Gazakh district by 1919. Their activities included looting landowners' properties, redistributing land to peasants, and killing government representatives. In response, a military detachment equipped with artillery and machine guns was dispatched to the region, initiating military confrontations with the group by October.

In Ganja Governorate, Qatir Mammad, considered a national hero by the Azerbaijan Soviet Encyclopedia, emerged as the main leader of the peasant movement. Another group, led by former convict Kerbalayi Asgar, operated in the village of Yukhari Ayibli (modern-day Shishtepe) in Gazakh district. This group killed beys and government officials along with their families. After destroying all properties belonging to the Sultanov family, they were forced to leave Shamkir district. The governor warned that unless urgent steps were taken to suppress Asgar's group, his "influence and popularity among the masses would grow significantly."

Qatir Mammad's group, which managed to establish connections with the Bolsheviks, had broader activities in rural areas. The group seized properties from wealthy individuals, burned down their homes, and killed those who resisted. On 20 March 1919, the combined forces of Qatir Mammad, Kerbalayi Asgar, M. Aliyev, and Kor Vali formed a 600-strong armed unit and laid siege to Ganja, Azerbaijan's second-largest city. They forced Governor Colonel Vekilov and his surviving troops to leave the city. This event became one of the main factors leading to the collapse of Fatali Khan Khoyski's government. Kerbalayi Asgar and Qatir Mammad were killed on 20 July and 18 September 1919, respectively, but armed conflict in the governorate persisted.

The situation in Mughan remained tense, and Lankaran district descended into near-anarchy. Like Ganja, armed groups emerged in Lankaran. For example, in the village of Mistan in the Zuvand district, a group of peasants formed under the leadership of blacksmith Bala Mammad. In the Mughan plain, conflicts arose between villages labeled as "Bolshevik" (Privolnoye, Griboyedovka, Petrovka, Grigoryevka) and "counterrevolutionary" (Novogolovka [Uzuntepe], Andreyevka [Qarazanjir], Akhtarkhanovka, Pokrovka, Nikolayevka).

After the fall of the Baku Commune and the establishment of the Centrocaspian Dictatorship, the region came under the "Dictatorship of the Five." This was later replaced by the Mughan Regional Authority, whose power was primarily concentrated in the hands of military figures like Lazar Bicherakhov and M. Przhevalsky, commanders of the local army headquarters and Caspian Naval Forces, respectively. Bicherakhov later became one of the commanders of the Volunteer Army in the North Caucasus. Osipov, a Red Army soldier, described the situation as follows:

The situation in Lankaran was highly uncertain, with everyone vying for power. Even streets were named after these power struggles: Ryabovskaya Street, Akopov Street, Osipov Street, etc. Daily clashes occurred between these groups. One day, they attempted to arrest Akopov; the next day, it was Shevkunov, and so on. In short, complete anarchy. At night, we couldn't even go out onto the streets.

In the spring of 1919, the Bolsheviks declared the establishment of Soviet power in Lankaran and Mughan, making this the only region in the South Caucasus where Soviet authority existed at the time. Both Azerbaijani forces and military units under former tsarist officers opposed Bolshevik rule. In August 1919, a military campaign organized by the ADR, with support from the British government, ended Bolshevik authority in the region and restored Azerbaijani control.

The "Azerbaijan" newspaper, the official publication of the Musavat government, reported:

Unfortunately, Bolshevik propaganda is gaining significant success in rural areas and villages.

In February 1920, the Regional Committee of the Russian Communist (Bolshevik) Party informed its Central Committee:

We have full influence over the working and peasant classes... Extensive work is being carried out within many military units... and we are confident of their support.

=== Political crisis ===
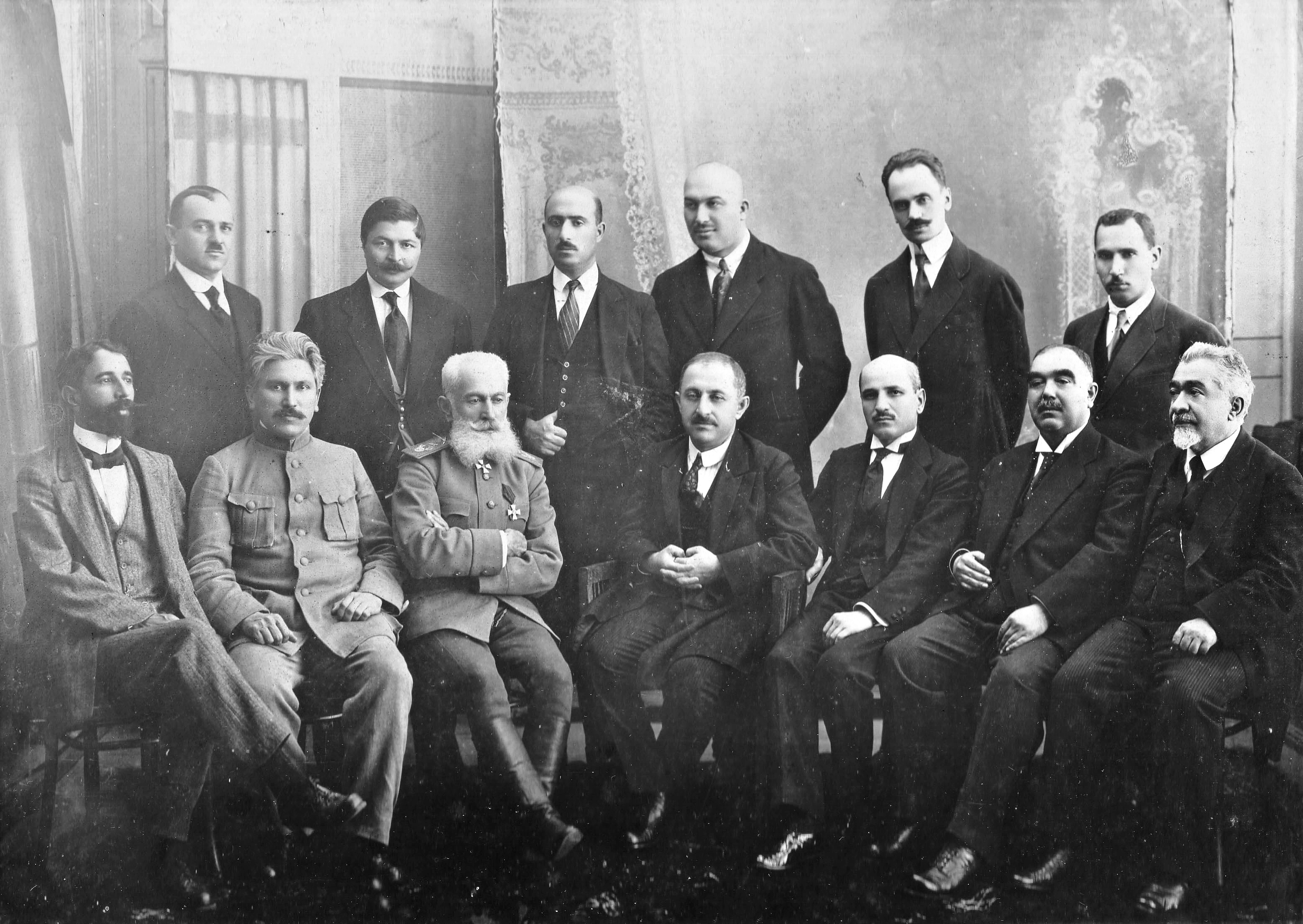
Members of the government of Nasib bey Yusifbeyli I. Seated: Aslan bey Safikurdski, Khudadat bey Malik-Aslanov, Samad bey Mehmandarov, Nasib bey Yusifbeyli, Mammad Yusif Jafarov, A. Hasanov, Abram Dastakyan; Standing: Kh. Amaspur, Rashid Khan Kaplanov, Agha Aminov, Jamo bey Hajinski, Victor Klenevski, Nariman bey Narimanbeyli.

The state was also in deep crisis. According to the law, the parliament was supposed to consist of 120 members, but throughout its entire existence, it was never able to reach this number. Many members rarely attended parliamentary sessions or participated in its activities. As a result, 20 sessions of the parliament could not be held due to the lack of a quorum. For such reasons, the government decided to impose fines for non-attendance at parliamentary sessions.

During the entire period of its activity, 230 legislative proposals were submitted to the parliament for discussion. More than two-thirds of these proposals were presented by the Ministries of Finance, Justice, Internal Affairs, and the Military. The Ministries of Public Education, Health, and Labor submitted 30 proposals, while the Ministry of Agriculture presented only 12. These legislative proposals were referred to various commissions, such as those on budget, military, land, and finance, where they often became stuck. One notable example of this was the draft law on agrarian issues, which remained mired in endless discussions, transfers, and withdrawals. During the second congress of the Musavat Party, Mammad Amin Rasulzadeh was compelled to declare that "the government... did not fulfill its promises regarding the peasant issue" and added, "we are still guided by old laws... the laws of Nicholas."

Irregularities, corruption, abuse of power, speculation, and similar practices were widespread in government institutions, giving rise to political scandals. For instance, the Minister of Trade and Industry, M. Asadullayev, became embroiled in a political scandal due to his secret dealings and abuses related to the sale of oil. This scandal led to the resignation of the Khoyski government and the formation of the Yusifbeyli government.

The prevailing political instability in the country intensified the struggle between Musavat, Ittihad, Ahrar, socialists, and non-partisan individuals. The Ittihadists, along with Turkish nationalist-military figures such as Khalil Pasha, Rufat Bey, and Yagub Bey, advocated for an alliance with Soviet Russia. Behbud Khan Javanshir, the leader of the non-partisan members in parliament, as well as Mammadhasan Hajinski, a member of the Musavat Party, also supported establishing friendly relations with Russia. As a result, the situation of Yusifbeyli's government was precarious. The forces led by Khoyski held an anti-Bolshevik stance, while those under Hajinski advocated the opposite.

The government's foreign and domestic policies were harshly criticized by the left wing of its own party. The Bolshevik newspaper Novy Mir wrote the following on the matter:

The Musavat Party has completely lost its influence in the country. It is still in power, it still directs politics, but it is now hanging by a thread. It no longer has any support among the broad masses of the population... The Musavat Party has outlived its usefulness.

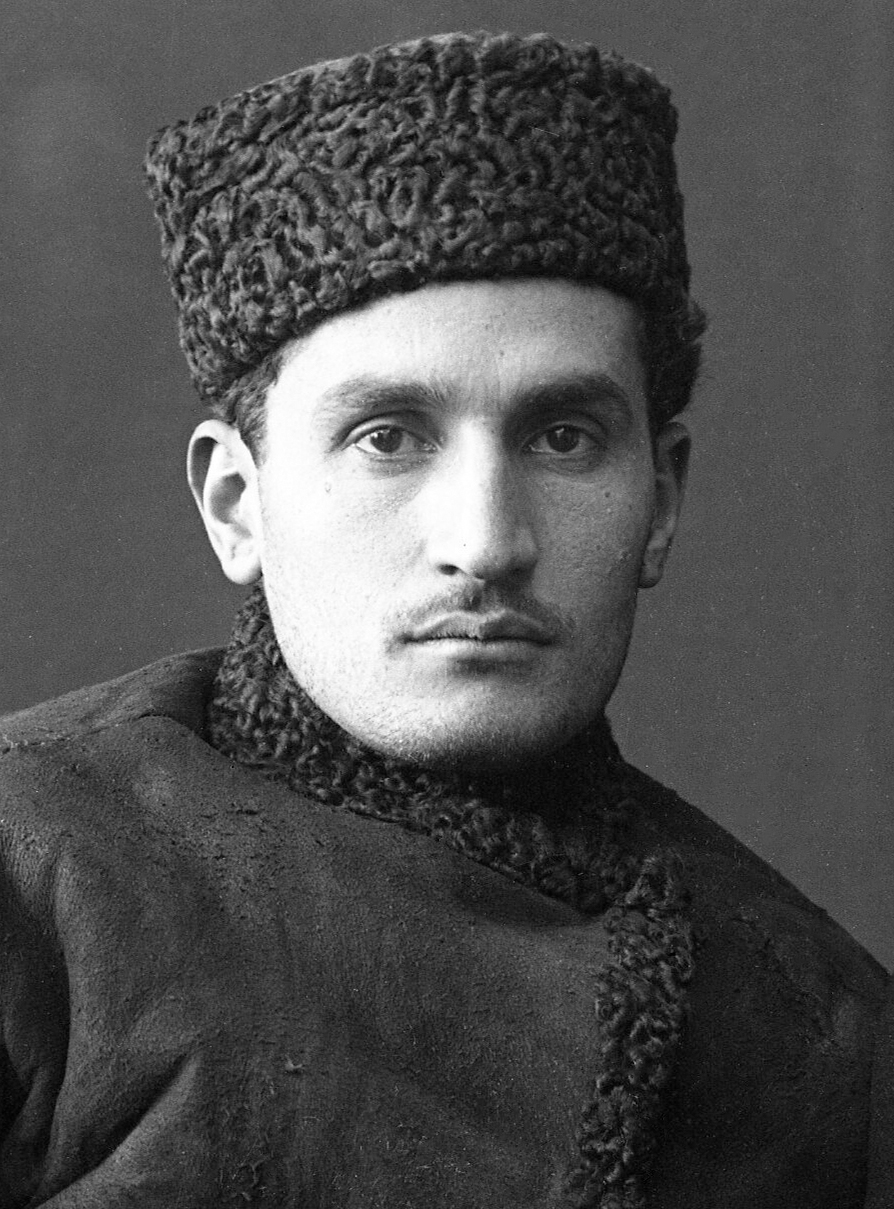
Aliheydar Garayev

=== Problems in the army ===
Instances of desertion were spreading within the ranks of the Azerbaijani army, and the Bolsheviks were actively working to exacerbate the situation. The Minister of War, Samad bey Mehmandarov, had warned the head of the Council of Ministers about this:

I fear that, since Baku has now become the center of the Bolsheviks of the South Caucasus, their negative influence on the Baku garrison is inevitable.

To address this issue, the Ministry of War requested the Prime Ministry to take steps to intensify propaganda in favor of the new political system within military units.

In addition to Baku, Bolshevik propaganda was also influencing military units in rural areas. Mirza Davud Huseynov later wrote about this:

We had organizations within the garrisons of Lankaran, Karabakh, and Guba.

A telegram dated 10 March 1920, from the governor of the Zaqatala district to the Ministry of Internal Affairs urgently requested the closure of reading rooms and canteens in Qakh, Zaqatala, and Balakan, as they had become centers of Bolshevik propaganda. At the same time, the Bolshevik Party Committee in Lankaran managed to establish three cells within the local garrison. Such activities resulted in growing unrest within several military units. In March 1920, some soldiers of the 5th Regiment refused to go to Karabakh to fight against the Armenian rebels. According to Huseynov, a significant portion of this regiment eventually joined the Bolsheviks. Available records indicate that some commanders themselves sympathized with the Bolsheviks. Aliheydar Garayev later wrote that the Deputy Minister of War, Aliaga Shikhlinski, disagreed with the government's policies and therefore "joined our side and offered us his assistance." When the Azerbaijan Democratic Republic (ADR) was occupied, Shikhlinski refused to carry out the government's order to blow up the railway to prevent the advance of the Bolsheviks’ armored train.

In addition to Bolshevik activities and propaganda, the poor conditions of soldiers, many of whom came from impoverished backgrounds, further deteriorated the army's combat readiness. According to Minister of War Mehmandarov, only the poor were enlisting in the army, and he stated, "I have not seen any khans or beys in the ranks of the army." The impoverished soldiers could not withstand the cold, hunger, and disease, leading to fatalities. The deceased were buried in the Chambarakand cemetery. B. Baykov, who was in Baku at the time, recalled seeing soldiers in poor condition with bare feet wandering the streets of Baku. The horses intended for combat were described as nothing more than "skin and bones."

By early 1920, the Azerbaijani army was beginning to disintegrate. By mid-April, only 300 of the 1,000 soldiers in the 5th Baku Regiment remained. Similarly, the Guba Regiment had 400 soldiers, the 1st Cavalry Regiment 380, the 8th Agdash Regiment 400, the 2nd Karabakh Cavalry Regiment 250, the Shaki Cavalry Regiment about 200, and the Ganja Infantry Regiment 400 soldiers. According to some sources, approximately 35,000 soldiers deserted from Karabakh, where they had been sent to suppress the Armenian rebellion, during the spring months. Incidents of insubordination and mutiny occurred in numerous locations. Major General Habib bey Salimov noted that by that time, the remnants of the army existed only on paper.

== On the eve of the uprising ==
=== Establishment of the Communist Party of Azerbaijan ===
At the beginning of 1920, communist organizations in Azerbaijan lacked a unified party structure. They recognized the necessity of merging into a single party to enhance their political activities. However, tensions between the Menshevik and Bolshevik factions of the Hummat Party led to their eventual split. Although left-wing Hummat members, under Ruhulla Akhundov's leadership, sought to merge with Azerbaijani Socialist Revolutionaries (SRs), complete consensus between the two groups could not be achieved. The Azerbaijani SRs advocated that only Azerbaijanis should participate in establishing the Azerbaijani Communist Party, positioning themselves as the sole representatives of the nation. Conflicts within the Adalat Party were resolved through the intervention of V. Naneishvili, Anastas Mikoyan, and Dadash Bunyadzade, preventing a division. During a general congress, a new Central Committee was elected. Discussions about unification dominated the meetings of all these parties. The SRs emphasized the need to involve Azerbaijani intellectuals who had been unfairly excluded from the political process. One of the critical topics of discussion was identifying the true culprits behind the March Events of 1918.

In early 1920, Moscow ordered the dissolution of national organizations in Azerbaijan and their consolidation into a single communist party. The new party was intended to unify all ethnic groups in the region and eliminate distinctions between Turks and Muslims. On 11–12 February 1920, a congress of Azerbaijani communist organizations convened in Baku, culminating in the establishment of the Azerbaijani Communist (Bolshevik) Party. Participants included 30 representatives each from the Baku branches of the Russian Communist Party, Hammat, and Adalat parties, as well as 30 delegates from regional organizations. The congress was held secretly in the Workers’ Club in Baku with its windows sealed. The congress decided that the Azerbaijani Communist Party would function as part of the Caucasus Regional Committee and recognize it as its superior body. A resolution under the section titled "The Current Situation" identified the primary goal of Azerbaijani communists: to prepare workers and peasants to overthrow the existing government through practical measures.

Disagreements between Western and Soviet Azerbaijani historians persist regarding these developments. Soviet Azerbaijani historians accused their Western counterparts of distorting historical facts. For instance, Firuz Kazemzadeh noted:

...Despite objections from regional committees, party rules were violated as Azerbaijani figures such as Qarayev, Sultanov, Akhundov, Huseynov, and others broke away to establish an independent Azerbaijani Communist Party.

Another historian, Tadeusz Swietochowski, argued that Bolshevik activities under the Musavat government were facilitated by the liberal environment created through British intervention. He asserted that Azerbaijani communists were reluctant to assimilate into the Russian party structure and framed the entire process as a "conflict between Russian centralism and Azerbaijani separatism."

=== Countermeasures by authorities. Government crisis ===
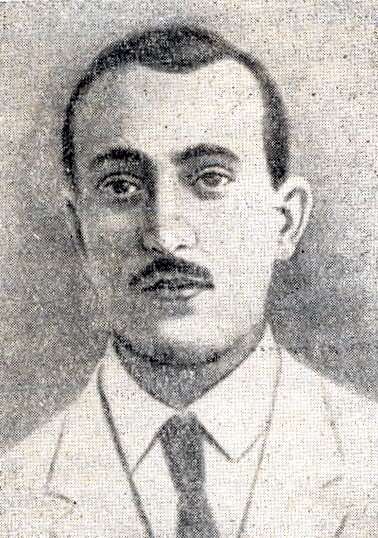
Ali Bayramov, a member of the Central Military Combat Headquarters under the Baku Committee of the RK(b)P, was training combat cadres in how to handle weapons.

Due to unrest among members of the military, the government increasingly relied on the police, which had been granted extensive authority. Baku's police chief, Rustam Bey Mirzayev, issued instructions to precinct chiefs, noting that while he had information regarding the increasing frequency of unlawful meetings and rallies organized by communists, no concrete evidence or reports of such activities had been received. He ordered police departments to maximize efforts to monitor communist activities, apprehend participants in any such meetings, and immediately report to him regarding these developments.

A month before the fall of Baku, government forces intensified their pressure on the Bolsheviks. On 22 February 1920, the editorial office of the Bolshevik newspaper "Novy Mir" was sealed, and several of its staff members were arrested by order of the Governor-General of Baku, General Murad Geray bey Tlekhas. A few days later, Tlekhas submitted a detailed report on measures to prevent Bolsheviks and other "enemies of the republic" from entering his jurisdiction. On 9 March, the newspaper "Azerbaijan Füqarası" was shut down. In an interview with the newspaper Azerbaijan, Interior Minister Mustafa Bey Vekilov stated that the government would not permit the Bolsheviks to conduct activities among the masses under any circumstances. He vowed to wage a relentless struggle against Bolshevism. On 10 March, he ordered the arrest of Zakariyya Balakhlinsky.

On 15 March, during a raid on the Central Workers’ Club in Baku, where a rally commemorating S. Kazibekov, who had been killed in Dagestan, was being held, 24 communist activists, including Dadash Bunyadzade, Gasim Ismayilov, and Sumbat Fatelizade, were arrested. On 18 March, Ali Bayramov, a member of the Central Committee of the Azerbaijani Communist Party and one of the leaders of the Bolshevik combat organization in Azerbaijan, was arrested by the police and later killed. His mutilated body and severed head were discovered near the Khatissov factory (later known as the Lieutenant Schmidt factory) in a working-class district of the city. News of Bayramov's arrest spread throughout the city before his body was found. Acting Minister of Internal Affairs Shafi Bey Rustambeyov and police chief Rustam Mirzayev denied in parliament that Bayramov had been arrested by the police in response to questions from MP Aliheydar Garayev. Prosecutor Nazarov ordered a criminal investigation into Bayramov's disappearance, and the Ministry of Justice launched a special inquiry under Rustambeyov's supervision to monitor the investigation of Bayramov's murder. Meanwhile, almost the entire membership of the Ganja committee, which had been preparing for an uprising, was arrested. On 25 March, the Minister of Internal Affairs contacted the Minister of Foreign Affairs, requesting immediate negotiations with Georgia's diplomatic representative to arrange for the deportation of arrested Bolsheviks to Batumi via Georgia, as it was deemed unsafe to detain them in regional areas.

Measures were also implemented to prevent Bolsheviks from crossing into Dagestan and returning to Azerbaijan. For instance, Agakishibeyov, the head of the Quba district, reported to the governor of Baku on 1 April that security posts had been established in the Yalama and Khazri regions, and border security measures were being organized. On 7 April, the military governor of the Baku province instructed the city's police chief to reinforce military outposts along the coastline and nearby islands, emphasizing that this measure was of "the highest state importance." According to Chingiz Ildirim, the authorities planned to fortify positions in Bayil, Shikhov, and Nargin Island, creating strong defensive fortifications. Police forces were being concentrated in Baku. On 15 April, the Minister of Internal Affairs ordered the transfer of 100 guards from the Ganja, Shamakhi, and Aghdam districts to the capital.

On 20 March, the Minister of Labor and Agriculture, socialist Ahmad Bey Pepinov, protested in a parliamentary session against the closure of the Workers’ Club and the arrests carried out. When the government's majority rejected a proposal to urgently discuss this statement, Pepinov resigned and relinquished his ministerial duties on 23 March. On the same day, the Baku Trade Union Council and the Presidium of the Central Workers’ Conference sent a letter to Pepinov protesting the persecution of workers’ organizations, demanding the reopening of closed facilities and the release of those arrested. By the end of the month, the socialist faction in parliament withdrew its support for Nasib Bey's cabinet due to the arrests of communists. This marked the final action of the Hummat party, which had already largely ceased to exist except for a few remaining politicians. Within weeks, members of Hummat individually joined the Communist Party, bringing an end to divisions among Azerbaijani Marxists.

On 30 March, tensions between Fatali Khan Khoyski and Mammad Hasan Hajinski escalated, leading the latter to leave the government. On 1 April, Nasib Bey's cabinet resigned. Following Pepinov, socialist Jamo bey Hajinski also resigned on 9 April. On 15 April, the Ahrar Party, represented by Aslan Bey Gardashov, declared its withdrawal from the coalition and recalled its representatives from the cabinet, leaving the Musavat Party isolated within the government. Intense debates erupted between various parties in parliament. Members of the Ittihad Party advocated for a military alliance with Soviet Russia and even suggested collaborating with the communists to stage a coup.

To retain leadership in the newly formed cabinet, the Musavat Party nominated Hajinski, a candidate supported by Ahrar and Ittihad. However, Hajinski faced opposition from the Musavat Party's right wing, which exerted significant pressure on the parliamentary faction. Hajinski initiated negotiations with the Bolsheviks and offered them ministerial posts, but his proposal was rejected.

=== Preparation for the uprising ===
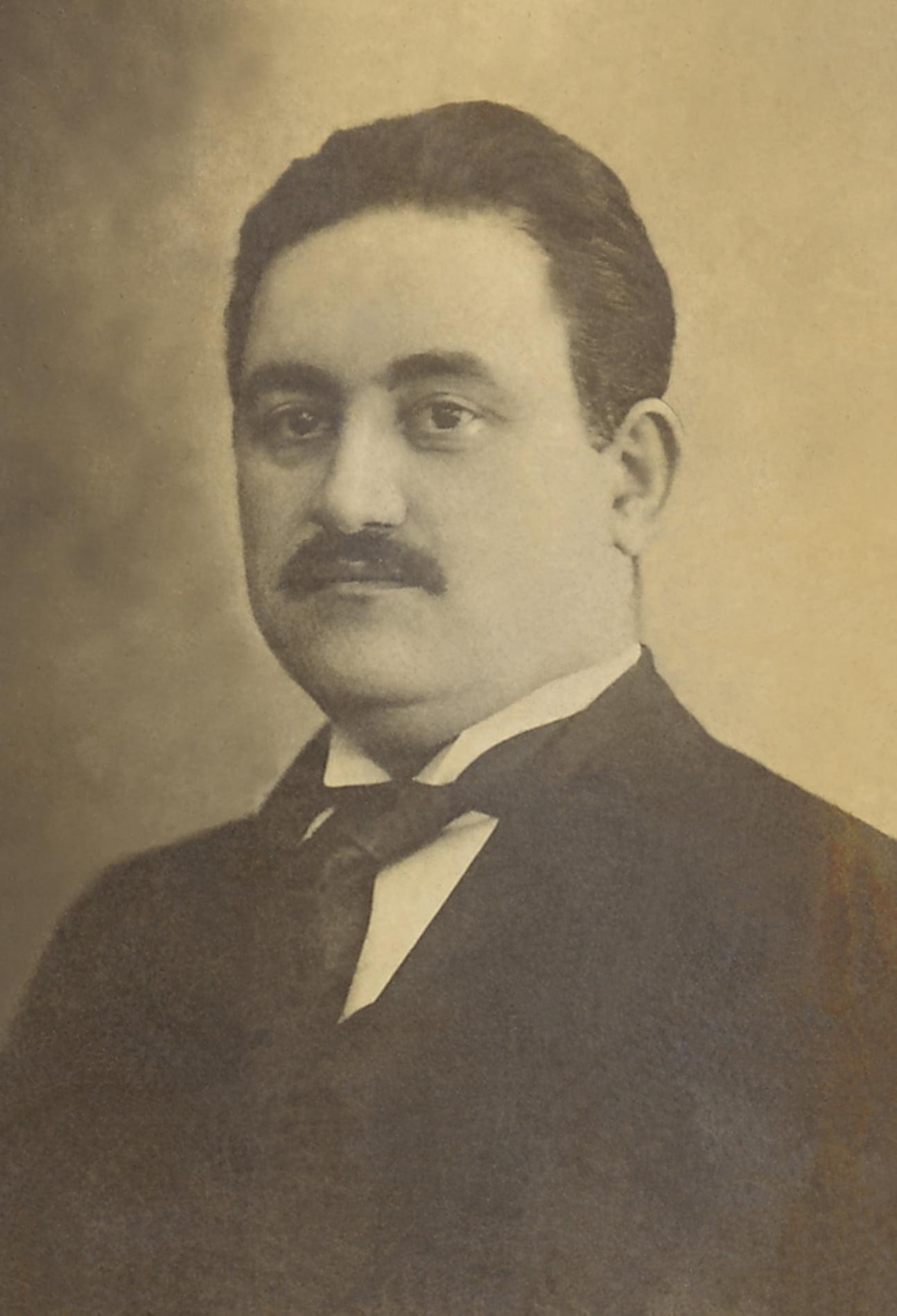
Mahammad Amin Rasulzade

On 25 October 1919, the General Baku Party Conference adopted a resolution to seize power. By late 1919, a revolutionary headquarters, led by Mirza Davud Huseynov and established by the Bolsheviks, was directly involved in preparing for an armed uprising. Funds and weapons were being smuggled into Baku from the North Caucasus and Astrakhan. For instance, in February 1920, the Baku Bolsheviks received 5 million rubles.

In the autumn of 1919, Hamid Sultanov secretly traveled to Tiflis to secure weapons for Baku. He managed to acquire and transport a significant quantity of arms, including two railcars full of weapons. Following the establishment of Soviet power in Turkmenbashi, the Bolsheviks began obtaining weapons from Central Asia, particularly through the Turkestan Front Command. In March 1920 alone, three sailboats loaded with weapons arrived in Baku from Turkestan. These weapons were stored at several bases established by the Military Combat Headquarters in Baku's working-class neighborhoods. Notably, a substantial cache of weapons, explosives, and valuables was stored at house No. 37 on First Bayilov Street. In a letter to Sergei Kirov, the Bolsheviks' Baku Bureau and the Regional Committee outlined their plans for the uprising as follows:

Our plan is to strengthen military organization, secretly organize combat forces, and adopt a cautious approach. All our actions align with an attack from Astrakhan, which we cannot imagine proceeding without... Our forces in the city of Baku alone consist of 20,000–30,000 unarmed individuals. There are 8,000–10,000 armed individuals on the Mughan plain. The population of Elizavetpol Province is in a revolutionary mood, as is the population of Baku Province. During the coup, these forces will side with us. We currently possess 2,500 rifles, ammunition, bombs, revolvers, etc.

In a 7 March telegram to the Central Committee of the RCP(b), Kirov reported that following the de facto recognition of Azerbaijan's independence by the Entente, the government had intensified its repression against the Bolsheviks, forcing them into clandestine activities. Nevertheless, during the Regional Committee's plenary session, it was expressed that a coup in Azerbaijan could be expected once the Red Army approached Petrovsk and the fleet advanced toward Baku. Kirov actively participated in preparations for the coup by sending workers, financial resources, weapons, and ammunition to the Baku Bolsheviks. On 9 March, two days after informing the Central Committee of the RCP(b) about the situation of Azerbaijan's Bolsheviks, Kirov sent a letter to Mikoyan proposing several measures for coordinated action between the armed groups in Baku and the XI Red Army. By the end of March, Boris P. Sheboldaev, the secretary of the Dagestan RCP(b) regional committee and deputy chairman of the Dagestan Revolutionary Committee, received a telegram from Garaev, a Menshevik member of the Azerbaijani parliament. The telegram stated:

We are preparing for a coup in Baku in the coming days. Before initiating operations, we will issue an appeal to Azerbaijan's workers and peasants explaining the purpose of our movement.

In March, the Azerbaijani authorities uncovered the Bolsheviks' military organization. When the police raided their headquarters in Baku, they obtained several critical documents. On 30 March, the newspaper "Azerbaijan" published an article titled "The Exposure of the Bolshevik Revolt," and on 2 April, "Georgia" in Tiflis newspaper featured an article titled "Bolshevik Uprising in Baku." According to Azerbaijan, the authorities had obtained detailed information about the planned uprising in Baku and throughout Azerbaijan. These documents revealed the extent of the preparations, including lists of party members capable of carrying weapons, their categorization by military expertise, the formation of combat units, and the appointment of commanders. Additionally, proposals were made for unit leaders and political commissars to assess the enemy's positions in their areas and keep unarmed combatants in reserve, ready for mobilization.

On 22 April 1920, during an emergency meeting of the RCP(b) Caucasus Bureau and the Central Committee of the Azerbaijani Communist Party (ACP), with representatives from the XI Red Army in attendance, it was decided to send an ultimatum to the Azerbaijani government on 27 April, demanding the transfer of power. To avoid undesirable consequences in Turkey and other Muslim countries, Azerbaijan Communist Party representatives secured guarantees from the XI Red Army headquarters that their forces would not enter Azerbaijani territory until 24 hours after the uprising began.

On 24 April, the RCP Caucasus Bureau, along with the ACP Central and Baku Committees, declared a state of military readiness for the Baku Party Organization. A decision was made to place the entire Baku regional party organization on high alert, with supreme party leadership and command functions entrusted to the newly formed Combat Headquarters. This decision suspended the organizational activities of the ACP Central Committee, the Baku Committee, and all regional committees, transferring their operations to the Combat Headquarters. All party members were mobilized and ordered to follow the directives and instructions of the Combat Headquarters. Furthermore, any failure to fulfill assigned duties, concealment, or delays were considered acts of treason and betrayal, punishable accordingly. At that time, an illegal issue of the newspaper "Yeni Dunya", the organ of the AKP Central and Baku Committees, was published with slogans such as "A call to overthrow the bey-khan government of Musavat", "Long live Soviet power!" and "Long live Soviet independent red Azerbaijan!".

On 25 April, communist statements, leaflets, and posters related to the day of the uprising were printed clandestinely at the government printing house. On 26 April, an emergency meeting of the AKP Central Committee and the RCP Caucasus Bureau established an operational headquarters to lead the uprising. The headquarters included Mirza Davud Huseynov, I.I. Dovletov, E.A. Kvantaliani, Victor Naneyshvili, Hamid Sultanov, and I.N. Chikaryov. The military-operational leadership of the uprising was carried out from two locations—the main headquarters at house No. 101 on Gymnasium Street (now Lev Tolstoy Street) and the city headquarters at house No. 36 on Shakhlar Lane near the Juma Mosque.

== On the eve of the arrival of the XI Red Army ==
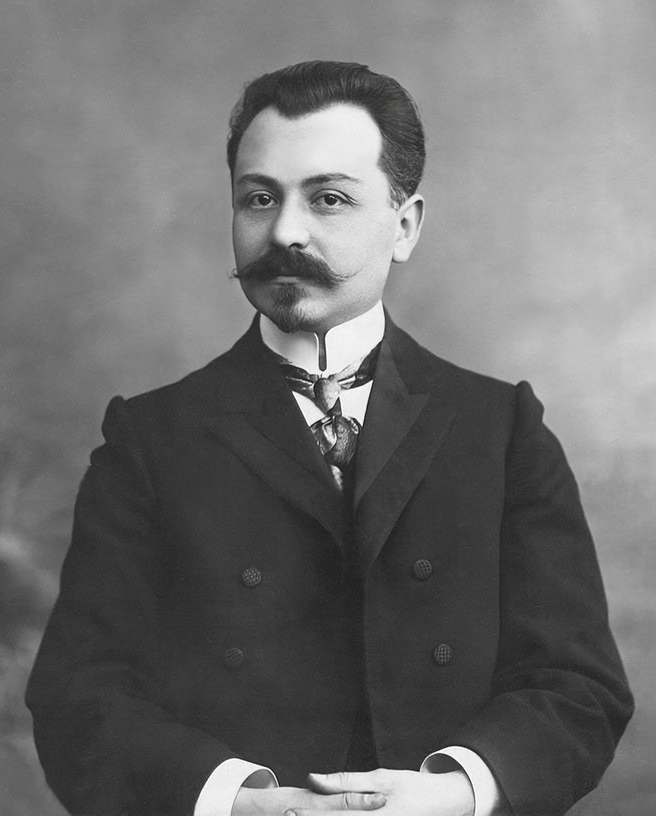
Fatali Khan Khoyski

=== The military-political situation in the spring of 1920 ===
In early January 1920, the Soviet Russian Commissar for Foreign Affairs, Georgy Chicherin, sent a note to the Minister of Foreign Affairs of the Azerbaijan Democratic Republic (ADR), Fatali Khan Khoyski. In the note, Chicherin proposed an alliance against Anton Denikin, the leader of the White Army, attempting to draw the ADR into the Russian Civil War. Khoyski rejected Chicherin's proposal.

In a second note, Chicherin criticized the Azerbaijani government in diplomatic language for rejecting the offer. In a response written by Fatali Khan at the beginning of February, he stated that any discussions on this matter would first require the recognition of Azerbaijan's sovereignty. Chicherin, avoiding the issue of recognition in his reply, interpreted Khoyski's response as a rejection of the offer.

As Azerbaijani communists prepared for an uprising, the Red Army, having defeated the White Army forces in southern Russia in the Don and North Caucasus regions, approached Azerbaijan's borders. In March, Kirov reported to the Central Committee of the Russian Communist Party that Azerbaijani communists planned to overthrow the Musavat government with the support of Red Army and navy forces, combined with an uprising of workers and peasants.

By the spring of 1920, Soviet Russia had recognized the independence of three non-Soviet states that had emerged within the former empire: Poland, Finland, and Estonia. At that time, several power centers were vying for control across the fragmented territory of the former empire. Makhno's forces were active in southeastern Ukraine, White Army troops defended Crimea, and the war against White Finnish forces continued in Karelia. Particular attention was focused on the Polish front. On 6 March, Polish troops launched an offensive in Belarus, capturing Mozyr and Kalinkovichi. Four attempts by the 12th and 14th Red Army units to counterattack and recapture Mozyr failed. In March, a course of action favoring a military resolution to the Azerbaijan issue gained prominence among Bolshevik leadership. Nonetheless, even Vladimir Lenin harbored certain doubts. The intensification of Soviet-Polish tensions prompted him to reconsider the feasibility of the operation. Simultaneously, he considered the continuation of diplomatic dialogue. On 11 March, Lenin wrote to Lev Trotsky:

No matter how much Khan Khoyski disputes, serious negotiations are evidently needed. If we must direct all our forces toward Poland and Finland, and if oil can be obtained peacefully, wouldn't it be prudent to delay the war?

Despite Lenin's hesitation regarding a large-scale or protracted conflict in the South Caucasus due to the Soviet-Polish tensions, A. Marshal suggests that the prospect of military operations on the Western Front underscored Soviet Russia's urgent need for oil. As a result, Lenin approved the organization of a coup to overthrow the government in Baku on 17 March. According to Russian historian V. M. Mukhanov, optimistic reports from the Caucasian front about the Red Army's successful progress in the North Caucasus convinced Lenin that this approach was the correct one. On the same day, Lenin sent a telegram to members of the Military Revolutionary Council of the Caucasian Front, Ivar Smilga and Sergo Ordzhonikidze:

Baku is extremely, extremely important to us. Direct all efforts toward this, but ensure absolute diplomacy in statements and guarantee the solid establishment of local Soviet authority. The same applies to Georgia, but I recommend acting with greater caution.

Meanwhile, the membership of the Azerbaijani Communist Party continued to grow, reaching 4,000 members by April 1920. Many viewed surrendering to the Bolsheviks as the only way to save the republic. Notably, then-Minister of Internal Affairs Mammad Hasan Hajinski actively advocated this idea. Even after being assigned to less central positions within the Cabinet of Ministers, Hajinski continued to support pro-Russian economic activities, including the sale of oil to the Soviets.

Given the deteriorating situation on the Polish front, certain military units from the Caucasus had to be redeployed. This necessitated discussion not about the plan for the Baku operation but rather about the number of forces to be allocated for it. On 21 March, Lev Trotsky, chairman of the Military Revolutionary Council, directly contacted Stalin, who was managing reinforcements for the Caucasian front. Trotsky remarked:

It is planned to withdraw three infantry divisions and three cavalry divisions from you in connection with the capture of Novorossiysk and Grozny. Additional forces will only be sent to you after navigation opens. Under such conditions, do you consider it feasible to carry out and maintain the Baku operation? Keep in mind the possibility of Azerbaijan receiving support from Georgia.

Stalin responded that six divisions could be sent to the Polish front from the Caucasian front, and "the remaining forces will easily secure the Baku region. Georgians will not pose a threat if we promise them neutrality."

By that time, the 11th Red Army had approached Dagestan, where battles continued between White forces and mountain insurgents. Turkish General Nuri Pasha fled from Dagestan to Azerbaijan on the night of 21 March. Meanwhile, the situation in Karabakh escalated. On the night of 22–23 March, as Nowruz celebrations were underway, Armenian armed groups launched a surprise attack on Azerbaijani garrisons in Shusha, Askeran, and Khankendi, attempting to catch them unprepared. The Azerbaijani government deployed its main armed forces to Karabakh to suppress the uprising.

While Azerbaijani troops were engaged in quelling the uprising in Karabakh, the struggle for Dagestan reached its final stage. On the night of 25 March, the 1st Derbent Soviet Regiment and Lezgi insurgents attacked Derbent, capturing the city and later advancing toward the port of Petrovsk. In the north, insurgents launched an offensive on the Temir-Khan-Shura front on 26 March, breaking through the front line and capturing Temir-Khan-Shura the following day. To the north of the city, the 11th Red Army entered Khasavyurt on 28 March. The combined Red Army and insurgent forces occupied Petrovsk on 30 March. General D. P. Drachyenko's troops boarded ships and moved toward Baku. The 11th Red Army units reached the Azerbaijani border.

In this context, it is essential to highlight the observations of academic Pustakhanim Azizbeyova. She emphasized that the Soviet Russian party-state leadership embraced Karl Marx's idea of world revolution and linked the Russian Revolution with revolutions in advanced countries like Germany, France, and England. She cited Nikolai Bukharin's words: "...every proletarian state has the right to red intervention," because "the expansion of the Red Army signifies the spread of socialism, proletarian power, and revolution." Azizbeyova concluded that:

The October Revolution was primarily a Russian revolution. Subsequently, during the struggle against the White Army, the revolution, represented by Soviet power, extended to the peripheries of the former empire. The same occurred in Azerbaijan and throughout Transcaucasia.

=== Preparation for Military Operation ===
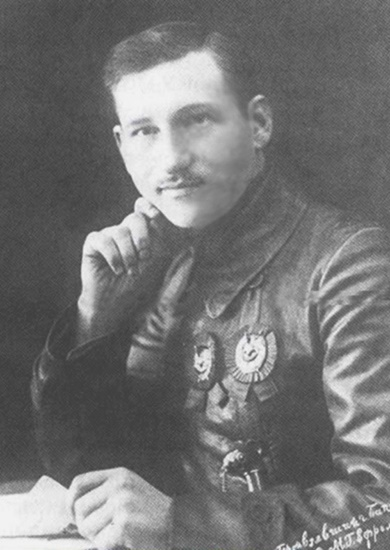
Commander of the armored train group Mikhail Yefremov.

The relocation and assembly of new Red Army forces began in Dagestan. On 2 April, an order issued by M.K. Levandovski, commander of the 11th Red Army, and K.A. Mekhanoshin, a member of the army's Revolutionary Military Council, tasked Corps Commander Smirnov with relocating certain military units, including moving troops from Port-Petrovsk to Derbent. Additionally, the 7th Cavalry Brigade of the 34th Cavalry Division was assigned to the command of the 7th Cavalry Division. The same order instructed the 49th Division and the Terek Group to move towards Port-Petrovsk, while Nesterovskiy was directed to position his troops in Dagestan alongside Smirnov's corps. It was anticipated that by mid-April, the 39th Division, Kuryshko's Cavalry Division, and the 2nd and 32nd Divisions would arrive in Temir-Khan-Shura.

On 15 April, the Minister of Foreign Affairs of the Azerbaijan Democratic Republic, Fatali Khan Khoyski, sent a note to Georgy Chicherin, the People's Commissar for Foreign Affairs of the Russian Soviet Federative Socialist Republic. The note, which went unanswered, stated:

At present, the significant concentration of military forces of the Russian Soviet government is observed near the borders of Dagestan, particularly in the Derbent region. As the Azerbaijani government is unaware of the Soviet government's intentions, we urgently request information regarding the reasons and objectives for the concentration of these troops in this region.

The Revolutionary Military Council of the 11th Red Army anticipated that if the Red Army entered Azerbaijani territory, Georgian Mensheviks would come to the aid of the Musavatists. On 5 April, Ordzhonikidze reported this potential threat to Lenin via telegram. A more significant concern, however, was the possibility of Anglo-American intervention. Therefore, to simultaneously coordinate with an armed uprising in Baku, the army planned a surprise offensive. In the early hours of 21 April, at 3:00 a.m., the command of the Caucasian Front issued a directive to the 11th Red Army and the Volga-Caspian Military Fleet to attack Baku. The operation aimed to capture the territory of Baku Governorate, commencing on 27 April from the Yalama-Baku axis with amphibious support and concluding within five days without damaging the oil fields.

On 21 April 1920, Mikhail Tukhachevsky issued the following directive to the 11th Red Army and the Volga-Caspian Military Fleet regarding the planned assault on Baku:

The main Azerbaijani forces are concentrated in the western part of the country. According to our intelligence, only a small Azerbaijani detachment is defending the Yalama-Baku station. In accordance with the accepted directives, I order the following:

1. The commander of the 11th Red Army shall cross the Azerbaijani border on April 27 and rapidly seize control of Baku Governorate. The Yalama-Baku operation must be completed within five days. Cavalry units are to be dispatched to protect the Transcaucasian railways near Kürdəmir.

2. As the 11th Army advances towards the Absheron Peninsula, the commander of the Caspian Fleet, Raskolnikov, shall deploy a small detachment near Alat station. This detachment will operate under the command of the 11th Army. Using the entire tanker fleet, execute a swift raid to seize control of Baku and prevent any damage to the oil fields.

On 22 April, the 39th Cavalry Regiment detained 15 individuals upon arriving in Baku. Interrogated at the headquarters of the 7th Cavalry Division, they revealed that Baku had been fortified from the sea, heavy artillery had been positioned on Nargin Island, and the Soviet fleet was awaited from Astrakhan. They also reported the closure of the Workers’ Club, the arrest of several members, the discovery of a workers' arsenal, and that Baku's workers were eagerly anticipating the Soviet army.

The next day, Hajinski announced that forming a new government was not feasible. On 23 April, the Caucasian Front Command issued a new directive, which declared that the 11th Army's primary objective was not only to capture Baku Governorate but to occupy the entire territory of Azerbaijan. On 24 April, M.G. Yefremov was appointed head of the main railway battle sector, placing all armored trains, landing detachments, and other forces of the 11th Army under his command. The following day, he was summoned to the Revolutionary Military Council in Port-Petrovsk, where he was ordered to attack Baku with armored trains, "enter the seaport, and engage enemy naval artillery." The operation was prepared in secrecy, with most orders issued verbally, barring certain exceptions. According to Yefremov's memoirs, the operation was challenging to execute. Amid an outbreak of malaria, the 11th Red Army units had to traverse mountainous, arid, sparsely populated areas with scarce food and fodder, covering 40 kilometers daily over five days. Recognizing these difficulties, the Revolutionary Military Council, led by Ordzhonikidze and Kirov, decided to dispatch armored trains and landing detachments to Baku and its seaport to paralyze the Azerbaijani government.

On 25 April, combat order No. 52 was announced to the troops, to take effect on the evening of 26 April. The Revolutionary Military Council directed all forces, except armored trains and landing detachments, to commence their assault at dawn on 27 April. The armored train detachment, led by Yefremov, was not assigned a specific timeframe but was authorized to strike at any time before the general offensive. On 26 April, representatives of the Central Committee of the Azerbaijani Communist Party, including Gazanfar Musabekov, Habib Jabiev, and Anastas Mikoyan, arrived at the armored train group's headquarters on the Azerbaijan-Dagestan border. That same day, the headquarters of the 11th Red Army was relocated from Petrovsk to Derbent. By the evening, the regrouping of the 11th Army was completed, and all units assumed their positions.

At dawn on 27 April, an aircraft piloted by S.A. Monastriyov and L.K. Grauding-Grauds took off from Port-Petrovsk. Their mission was to scout the route for the armored train group participating in the operation and to establish contact in Baku with revolutionary workers' organizations and, specifically, Aliheydar Garayev.

== Forces ==
=== Soviet Russian ===
The XI Red Army units concentrated in Dagestan consisted of three infantry divisions (20th, 28th, and 32nd), a separate but operationally united division (composed of two infantry brigades and one cavalry brigade), and the 2nd Cavalry Corps. The latter included two cavalry divisions and one cavalry brigade (7th Cavalry Division, Separate Cavalry Division, and the Taman Cavalry Brigade).

The XI Red Army also had six armored train groups at its disposal: III International, Timofey Ulyantsev, Red Dagestan, Red Astrakhan, Stepan Razin, and Red Soldier. Due to the damage to the railway bridge over the Aksay River, the relocation of some armored trains was impossible, and as a result, only four armored trains participated in the operation. Consequently, the III International, Timofey Ulyantsev, Red Dagestan, and Red Astrakhan armored trains were prepared for the upcoming operation. On board the III International armored train was a landing detachment composed of two companies. American author G.L. Roberts noted the possibility that in April 1920, the Turkish Red Army—comprising several small detachments of members of the Turkish Communist Party—might have indeed participated in the intervention in Azerbaijan.

=== Azerbaijan Democratic Republic ===
As of 15 April 1920, the National Army of the Azerbaijan Democratic Republic, according to the XI Red Army headquarters' intelligence reports, consisted of approximately 30,000 bayonets and sabers. At that time, the majority of Azerbaijan's army (20,000 personnel) was concentrated in the Karabakh and Zangezur regions. Organized forces included one infantry division (comprising five regiments, approximately 12,000 bayonets) and one cavalry brigade (comprising two regiments, approximately 2,000 sabers).

Additionally, there were irregular militia units. About 3,000 personnel were stationed in the Baku garrison. In the capital, there were an infantry regiment, a cadet school (approximately 500 personnel), and a reserve police battalion (2,000 personnel). The Azerbaijani army had at its disposal two armored trains, six armored vehicles, five aircraft, and other equipment.

Near the Dagestan border, around the Samur River area, forces numbering approximately 3,000 personnel, along with two armored trains, were stationed in Quba, Qusar, and Khudat stations. At the border itself, a gendarmerie division was positioned. According to General G. Kvinitadze's memoirs, before crossing the border, a defensive line approximately 15–20 versts long stretched from the mountains to the sea along the Samur River; the bridge was under Bolshevik control. This defensive line was manned by a single battalion led by Georgian Colonel Tumanishvili.

== Chronology of events ==
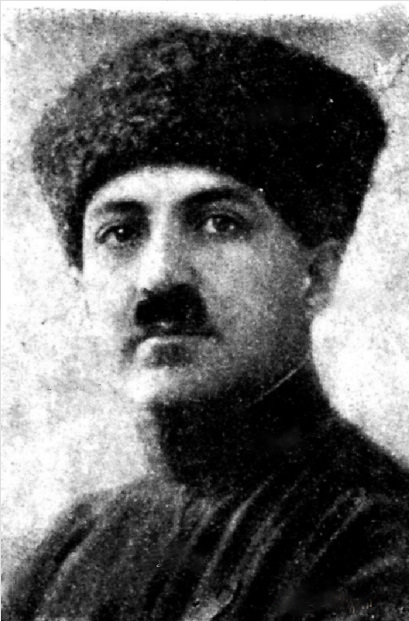
Chingiz Ildyrym established control over the Azerbaijani Navy and, under the command of the fleet, entered the bay, pointing the ships' guns at the government and parliament buildings.

=== The April invasion in Baku ===
On the day before the invasion, workers in the districts organized the protection of oil fields to prevent the Musavatists from setting them on fire. Following orders from the headquarters planning the invasion, a group of communists severed the telegraph wires of the Ganja-Baku line on 26 April. This was intended to prevent the Azerbaijani army units from being called in from Ganja. During the night of 27 April, railway workers dismantled the railway tracks between Keshla station (6 km north of Baku) and Bilajari junction station (14 km north of Baku). This action aimed to prevent the Musavatists from deploying their forces in Baku against the XI Red Army. To cut off the enemy's retreat routes, a detachment of 450 workers was stationed near a bridge in the Keshla station area.

That same night, the head of the Baku port and deputy of the military port, Chingiz Ildirim, organized the delivery of ammunition to the Navy's ships. Subsequently, he returned to the port administration, gathered his comrades, and brought along a group of artillerymen disguised as workers. While heading toward the ships, they were stopped by a Turkish officer and soldiers, who were quickly disarmed and taken to the port. To protect the fleet from the fire of coastal batteries located in Bayil, Ildirim, along with a few fighters, seized all coastal artillery of the Azerbaijan Democratic Republic (ADR) and severed its connection to artillery stationed on Nargin Island. On the morning of 27 April, Ildirim's detachment launched a surprise attack on the Baku cadet school, disarming all its cadets. Later that morning, he and Bayil workers captured the first city police station and the ammunition depot in Bayil. The insurgents completely seized the military port and liberated all political prisoners held in Bayil prison, including Dadash Bunyadzade and Sumbat Fetelizade. The Azerbaijani flags were removed from all ships, replaced by the red flags of the Soviets. At 10 a.m., the naval fleet, under Chingiz Ildirim's command, entered Baku Bay and aimed the ship's cannons at the government and parliament buildings.

From the morning of 27 April, weapons and ammunition were distributed to workers’ detachments from clandestine armories. These armories, located on Nikoleysky Street (later renamed Communist Street), at the intersection of Krasnovodsk and Birzha Streets (now Samad Vurgun and Uzeyir Hajibeyov Streets), on Sadova Street (now Niyazi Street), and in the Bayil military port, were seized by the workers' detachments. Unarmed workers were promptly armed, and the weapons were transported to various districts of the city using trucks. Recruitment for voluntary combat detachments was conducted on the streets, involving workers and students alike.

When the uprising began, the Azerbaijani leadership contacted the British High Commissioner in Tbilisi, Luke, requesting that the Georgian government provide military assistance and exert pressure on Armenia to halt its military operations in Karabakh. Luke convened representatives from France and Italy, Georgian ministers, and Azerbaijan's diplomatic envoy in Tbilisi to discuss the request for aid.

Events in Baku escalated rapidly. Throughout the day, insurgents seized control of the railway station, post office, telegraph office, radio station, and several police precincts, bringing these facilities under their authority. The capture of major transportation and communication hubs by the workers’ detachments resulted in the government being entirely cut off from the outside world. Consequently, the government was unable to request timely assistance from loyal military units stationed in the provinces. Following instructions from the Trade Union, workers at the Baku telephone station ensured uninterrupted communication between the central headquarters and the industrial and factory districts of the city.

Under the influence of Bolshevik propaganda, the "Relief Regiment" defected to the insurgents’ side, taking control of several districts in Baku. Its forces provided armored vehicles to the Azerbaijan Revolutionary Committee (Azrevkom) and halted a train carrying British and Polish missions. In the railway station area, the 5th Artillery Battery and a cavalry detachment surrendered directly to the insurgents without resistance. By evening, the 7th Shirvan Infantry Regiment of the Azerbaijani Army also joined the insurgents. Workers' patrols detained officers on their way to their posts, forcing them to remove their military insignia. Realizing the hopeless situation for the Baku garrison and acknowledging that units of the 11th Red Army had already crossed the border (coinciding with the uprising), the Minister of War, Samad Mehmandarov, sought to avoid bloodshed. Together with the acting Chief of Staff, Major General Abdulhamid Gaytabashi, Mehmandarov signed Order No. 237, stating that "work within military departments, headquarters, offices, enterprises, and institutions should continue as before until their transfer to the new authority is completed."

Hamid Sultanov, acting on behalf of the Central Committee of the Azerbaijani Communist Party, the Bolshevik Party's Baku Bureau, and the leadership of the "Workers' Conference," delivered an ultimatum to the Azerbaijani government to surrender power. At noon, a delegation of Bolsheviks, led by Sultanov, presented the ultimatum to the Parliament and government, demanding the transfer of power to the Bolshevik Party within 12 hours. Sultanov later recalled the discussion held at Kazimov's apartment (Spaskaya Street, No. 11/5) with government representatives following the ultimatum. He noted that "the members of Parliament were so astonished that they could not utter a word for several minutes. When the chairman of Parliament read the ultimatum aloud, Aghamalıoğlu shouted: 'That's it! The bazaar is closed!'". Later in the evening, ships of the Caspian Military Fleet, including the gunboat Ardahan, formed a line in the sea by 7:00 PM, raising red flags. A second ultimatum was issued by Chingiz Ildirim, the commander of the Red Navy of Soviet Azerbaijan, threatening to open fire if the terms were not met.

Before the parliamentary session to discuss the ultimatum, a commission was established comprising Hajinski, Rasulzadeh, Gara bey Garabeyov, Aslan bey Safikurdski, and Aslan bey Gardashov. Aiming to prevent bloodshed, Shafi bey Rustambeyli, a member of the Central Committee of the Musavat Party, proposed in a closed meeting, attended by Yusufbeyli, that some deputies leave Baku for Ganja to organize resistance. However, his proposal was not supported by the participants. At 8:45 p.m., an emergency parliamentary session commenced, with the sole agenda item being the ultimatum to surrender power. Before discussions began, the Minister of War, Mehmandarov, informed the parliament that armed resistance was not feasible. At Rasulzadeh's insistence, it was decided to hold an open parliamentary session to inform the public. After the ultimatum text was read, Prime Minister Hajinski proposed accepting its terms. This proposal was supported by Agamalioglu ("Hummat"), Garabeyov ("Ittihad"), Safikurdski (Socialist Bloc), and Gardashov ("Ahrar"). Although Rasulzadeh disagreed with the terms of the ultimatum, the Musavat Party had to acquiesce to the majority opinion. Agamalioglu later recounted in his memoirs:

The parliament was full. First, Saniyev confirmed the necessity of surrendering and demonstrated its inevitability. Second, Mahammad Amin expressed regret over surrendering to the Bolsheviks without bloodshed but clarified that he did not favor resistance if others were unwilling. Then, I spoke, stating firmly, ‘No one will dare resist; no one will dare destroy the city or spill innocent blood in vain. Not a single drop of blood will be shed. And why? There is merely a change of power—Yusufbeyli, Khoyski, and other scoundrels and parasites are leaving office, to be replaced by Narimanov, Mirza Davud, and others who will defend the interests of workers and peasants. Will anyone dare resist? Time is of the essence—act swiftly.

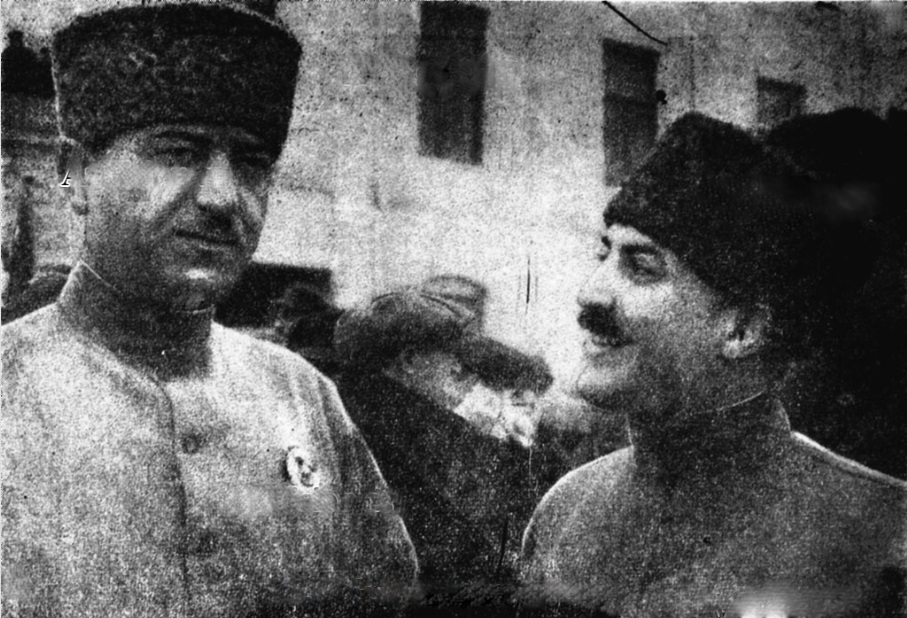
Hamid Sultanov and Chingiz Ildyrym. Hamid Sultanov, on behalf of the Central Committee of the ACP(b), the Baku Bureau of the Regional Committee of the RCP(b), and the presidium of the "workers' conference", presented an ultimatum to the Azerbaijani government to hand over power.

At 11:00 p.m., a vote was held. According to the results, the majority of the parliament approved the transfer of power to Azrevkom, with one vote against, three abstentions, and three members absent. The relevant document was signed by the deputy chair of the parliament, Mammad Yusif Jafarov, and Secretary Mustafa Vakilov. The document stipulated the following conditions for the transfer of power:

- Azerbaijan's full independence would be preserved under Soviet rule.
- The government formed by the Azerbaijani Communist Party would act as a temporary body.
- Regardless of external pressures, the congress of worker, peasant, and soldier deputies would determine the ultimate form of governance as the supreme legislative body.
- Only those in senior positions would be replaced; employees of state institutions would remain in their positions.
- The new government would ensure the safety of the lives and property of government and parliament members.
- Measures would be taken by the temporary government to prevent the Red Army from entering Baku by force.
- The new government would oppose all foreign forces attempting to subjugate Azerbaijan.

The parliamentary session lasted until 11:25 p.m., spanning 2 hours and 40 minutes. Immediately after the session ended, Agamalioglu traveled by car to the communist headquarters in Chemberekend. At 2:00 a.m. on 28 April 1920, the parliament was officially dissolved. In his final order, the Minister of War, Mehmandarov, thanked military personnel for their service and expressed confidence that the soldiers and officers of the Azerbaijani army would serve Azerbaijan under the new government with the same loyalty and bravery.

That same night, members of Azrevkom and the Azerbaijani Communist Party's Central Committee moved into the former parliament building. The Central Committee sent a telegram to V.I. Lenin in Moscow, stating that the Musavat Party government had been overthrown and that the Azerbaijani Revolutionary Committee (Azrevkom) was now the sole authoritative governing body in the country. Azrevkom comprised six members: Nariman Narimanov, Mirza Davud Huseynov, Gazanfar Musabeyov, Hamid Sultanov, A. Alimov, and Aliheydar Garayev. The telegram noted that Azrevkom would exist until a congress of worker, peasant, and soldier deputies was convened. In its session, Azrevkom decided to establish the Council of Ministers (the government), composed of Narimanov, Ildirim, Sultanov, Garayev, Musabeyov, Huseynov, Bunyadzadeh, Vezirov, and Alimov.

=== The raid of the armored trains ===
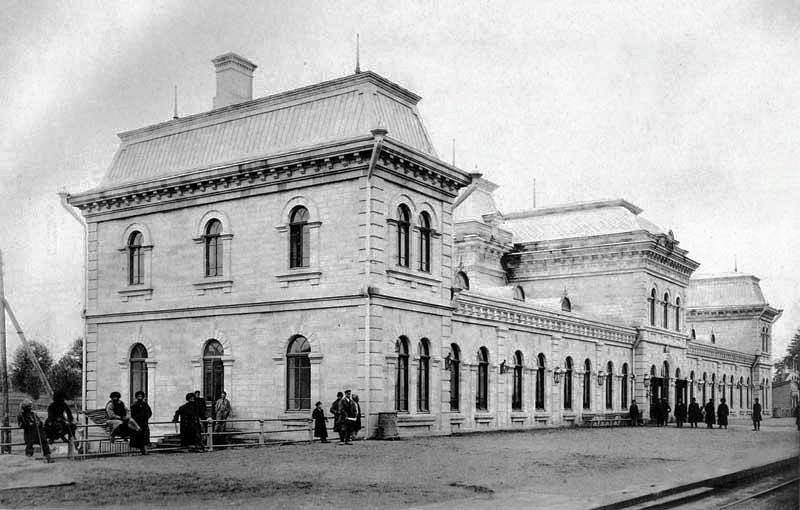
Khachmaz Railway Station

In the lead-up to the operation, Soviet armored trains were stationed near the Samur River bridge at Azerbaijan's border. These trains included "III International", "Timofey Ulyantsev" (under Tereşchenko's command), "Red Dagestan" (commanded by Polovinkin), and "Red Astrakhan" (led by Bogdanov). Alongside Red Army soldiers, the leadership of the Azerbaijani Communist Party was also present aboard these armored trains. The overall command of the armored train group was carried out by M. G. Yefremov. Recalling the situation at the border, he wrote in his memoirs:

During the day, two sentries stood on the bridge. In the middle of the bridge—on our side stood two soldiers, and on the enemy side, two more. Between the sentries, a thick wire was stretched across the middle of the bridge, marking the border line. The sentries often exchanged words, mostly insults, attempting to prove—if they spoke a common language like Turkish or Russian—which government was better or more beneficial for the poor.

According to Musabeyov's memoirs, at 3:00 a.m. on 27 April, Yefremov gave the order to "Advance." The movement of the armored trains was conducted in two groups: the first group consisted of "III International" and "Red Dagestan", while the second group included "Timofey Ulyanov" and "Red Astrakhan." The location of the second group was equipped with long-range artillery, tasked with supporting the first group and countering Azerbaijani ships. Initially, the armored train "III International" advanced across the border, followed by "Red Dagestan". Notably, "III International" crossed the border 12 hours before Azerbaijani communists issued an ultimatum to the parliament. The news of the Red Army crossing the border came as a surprise to Azerbaijani communists, particularly when it became clear that the Russians had broken their promise to wait 24 hours.

The "III International" armored train, upon reaching the Samur bridge, overcame the wire barrier installed at the border and entered enemy territory. According to Yefremov's memoirs, its arrival caused confusion on the Azerbaijani side. Azerbaijani fighters attempted to resist but were repelled by the detachment aboard the armored train. The battle with Azerbaijani border guards lasted for 10 minutes, involving close-range gunfire, bayonet thrusts, and hand-to-hand combat. The deputy military commissar of the Soviet armored train group, P. A. Druganov, recalled that Yefremov, upon witnessing the retreating garrison, climbed onto the roof of the armored train and shouted to those fleeing:

Soviet power has arrived! Anyone who wishes to be with us in Baku, climb onto the platforms!

As they advanced, the armored trains used machine gun fire to disperse a squadron of Azerbaijani cavalry along the way. By 4:00 a.m. on 27 April, the main forces of the 11th Red Army crossed the border following the armored trains.

A specialized communications group cut the cables connecting the border post near the bridge to the next fortified position—Yalama Station. This area contained a fortified Azerbaijani infantry regiment equipped with eight machine guns and two 48-caliber howitzers. A battle ensued near the station between Azerbaijani forces and Soviet armored trains. The Musavat forces attempted to cause a collision by sending a rapidly moving locomotive toward the leading armored train. However, a well-aimed shell from the armored train destroyed the locomotive. With the support of artillery fire from the armored train, the landing detachment launched an assault, capturing Yalama Station and seizing all Azerbaijani equipment as spoils of war. During the two-hour battle, six Red Army soldiers, including the landing detachment commander Nemkin, were killed, and eight others were wounded.

During the battle around the Yalama station, a group of telecommunication operators maneuvered around the enemy's flank and cut the cables leading to the Khudat station. This action rendered the Soviet forces' attack unexpected. The Azerbaijani military unit was unprepared for this sudden assault and could not mount effective resistance. Under heavy artillery fire from Soviet armored trains, the Azerbaijani forces retreated in disarray, abandoning their positions and leaving behind ten weapons of various calibers and other military equipment.

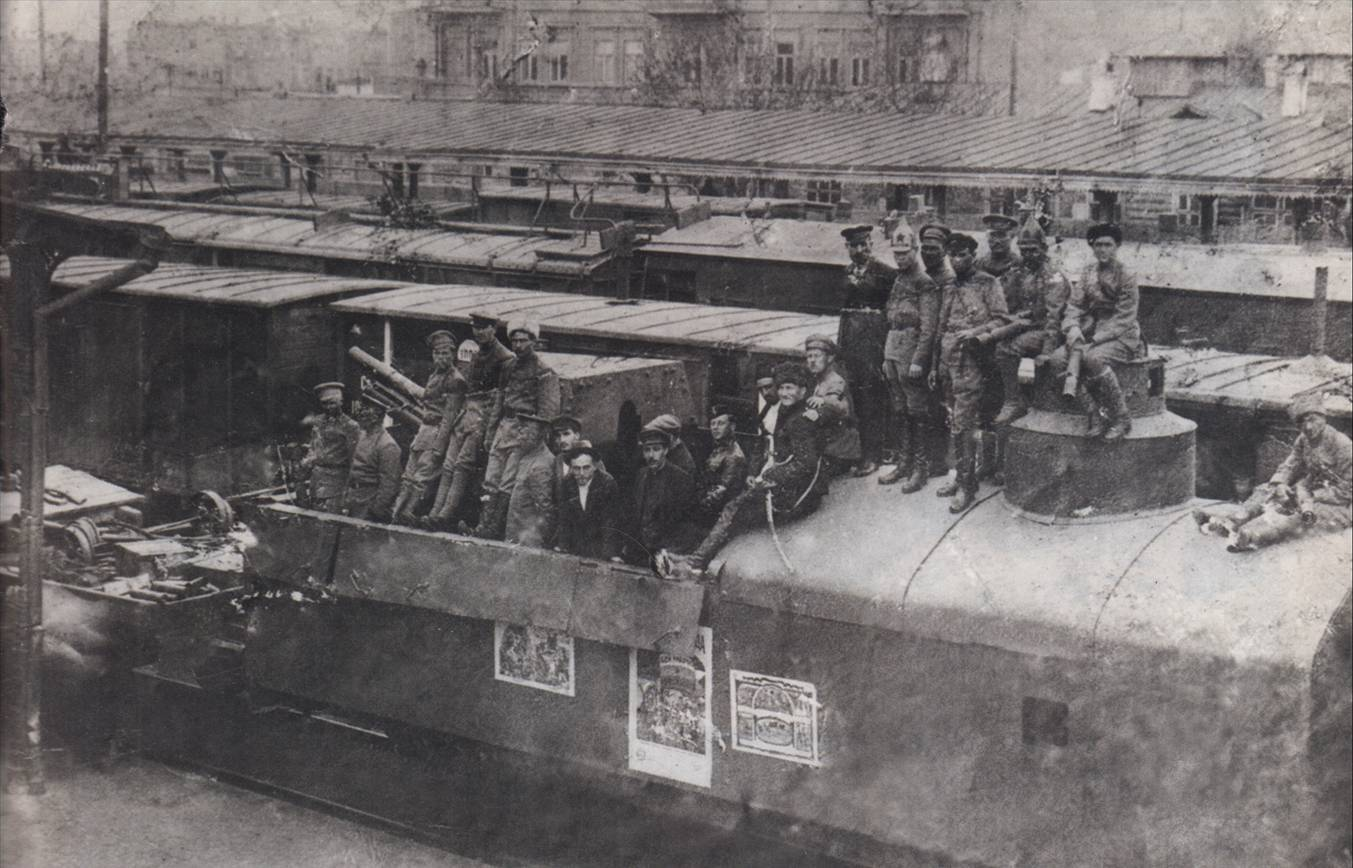
A photo taken on 28 April 1920, during the arrival of the Red Army armored train in Baku. The photo includes Mikhail Yefremov, Anastas Mikoyan, Gazanfar Musabeyov, Simon Ter-Petrosyan, and others.

During the events near the Hajigabul railway station, an Azerbaijani armored train under the command of Captain Knyaz S.F. Lordkipanidze advanced against the Soviet armored trains. This armored train was equipped with two cannons and 14 machine guns. Following a brief artillery duel at the Lecet pass, the Azerbaijani armored train retreated. Taking advantage of this withdrawal, the commander of the Soviet armored trains decided to continue their advance safely. After the Azerbaijani armored train withdrew, its crew set fire to a bridge and dismantled the railway crossing to impede the Soviets. However, as soon as the armored train moved away, railway workers extinguished the fire and quickly restored the crossing.

Azerbaijan's Minister of Defense, Samad bey Mehmandarov, urgently sent a telegram to the Western Front, where the main units of the Azerbaijani army were stationed:

The Bolsheviks have attacked Yalama station and are advancing. They have captured Khudat, and the situation is critical. I order two battalions, each with no fewer than 500 bayonets, to be dispatched from Gazakh and Ganja to Qizilburun.

Additionally, the Azerbaijani government appealed to the Menshevik government of Georgia for assistance based on the military-defense treaty signed in 1919. However, the Georgian leadership showed no intention of fulfilling the treaty's terms. Georgian Prime Minister Noe Jordania stated during a special session:

On April 27, the Azerbaijani government informed us that Bolshevik troops were approaching the border and requested our military assistance. We asked: does the Azerbaijani people wish to fight the Bolsheviks and take on this struggle themselves? If so, we are obliged to help under the treaty and from both political and moral perspectives... The Bolsheviks are advancing like an express train, without resistance, which implies Azerbaijan's consent to their advance.

A.S. Avalov remarked that "the Georgian-Azerbaijani military alliance was nothing more than a piece of paper."

At 10:00 p.m., the "Third International" armored train entered the Nasosnaya station, and half an hour later, it arrived at the Khirdalan station. Near Khirdalan, there was a fortified position protecting the bridge that connected the Baku–Yalama and Baku–Ganja railways. Here, another battle ensued between the "Third International" armored train and Prince Lordkipanidze's armored train. This engagement ended with the retreat of Prince Lordkipanidze's train toward Baku. Upon its arrival in Baku, the train was disarmed by the worker fighters of the Zavokzalny district.

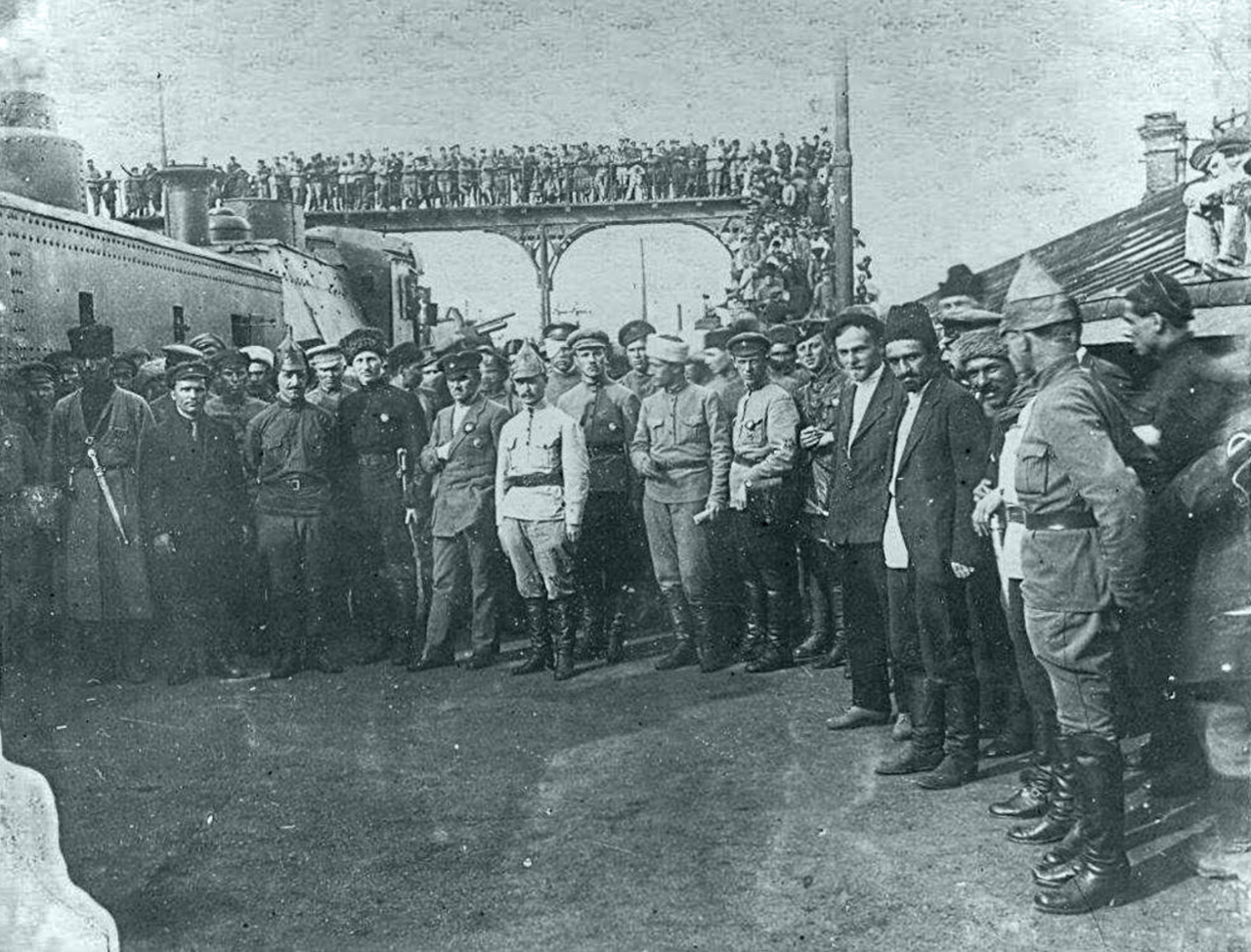
Sergei Kirov, Mikoyan, Sergo Ordzhonikidze and Levandovsky among Red Army soldiers and commanders of the 11th Army at the station in Baku, May 1920.

=== XI Red Army in Baku ===
According to reports from the Izvestia newspaper, the evening of 27 April witnessed a tense atmosphere in Baku, with the city's streets filled with people. News of the Soviet forces advancing and capturing the Khachmaz station spread rapidly across the city. As Soviet armored trains approached Bileceri, the Azerbaijani government handed over power to the communists. The Azerbaijani Revolutionary Committee sent the following telegram to Soviet Russia:

To everyone, everywhere. To Lenin, Moscow. Acting upon the will of the revolutionary proletariat of Baku and the Azerbaijani peasantry, the Provisional Military Revolutionary Committee of the Azerbaijan Soviet Socialist Republic declares the former Musavat government as traitors to the people and enemies of the nation's independence, severing all relations with the Entente and other enemies of Soviet Russia. Unable to resist the combined forces of foreign and domestic counter-revolution alone, the Azerbaijani Revolutionary Committee proposes entering a fraternal alliance with the government of the Russian Soviet Republic to jointly fight global imperialism and requests immediate assistance by dispatching Red Army units.

During a rally at the Workers’ Theater, Mikoyan noted that, including the last battle near Bileceri that lasted nine hours, Soviet forces had clashed three times with enemy armored units. According to P. A. Druganov's memoirs, the armored train III Internationale reached Bilajary station at 11 PM on the night of 27 April, cutting off the Azerbaijani government's retreat route to Tiflis. Musabeyov recorded that Bileceri came under their control at 2 AM on 28 April. However, Izvestia reported on 29 April that the armored trains arrived at Bileceri station at 3:30 AM.

On 28 April 1920, the XI Red Army's armored train entered Baku, with participants including Efremov, Mikoyan, Musabeyov, Kamo, and others. Following the capture of Bileceri station, reports reached the command that two Azerbaijani armored trains were approaching from the Ganja direction. Mikoyan dispatched two Soviet armored trains to intercept them, while others advanced toward Baku through the Keshla station. Musabeyov's memoirs recount a meeting in Bilajary to deliberate further actions, during which they received news of an approaching train. Deciding to wait, they were informed half an hour later by the train's crew that the Azerbaijani government had relinquished power.

At midnight on 27 April, the commander and commissar of the armored train detachment sent a report to the Revolutionary Military Council of the XI Red Army:

The mission has been successfully completed; as of midnight, April 27, 1920, Baku is under the control of Azerbaijani workers and peasants.

The armored trains advanced so swiftly that the XI Red Army's headquarters initially doubted the report about their arrival in Baku. Efremov recalls that the headquarters chief repeatedly had to verify through phone lines that the detachment was intact and that the report was genuine.

After receiving the report, the Revolutionary Military Council of the XI Red Army sent a telegram from Ordzhonikidze to V. I. Lenin in Moscow:

On the night of 27–28 April, at 2 AM, power in Baku transferred to the Azerbaijani Revolutionary Committee, and the Soviet Republic was proclaimed. At 4 AM, our armored trains advanced.

The XI Red Army command also reported to Moscow:

At the request of the Azerbaijani Soviet Government, our armored trains entered Baku. We hope the joint forces of both republics will defend the oil reserves from imperialist robbers. The Russian workers and peasants salute another Soviet Republic.

At 4 AM on 28 April, the armored train III Internationale arrived at Baku station, carrying Mikoyan, Musabeyov, Jabiev, Baba Aliyev, and others. They immediately proceeded to the former parliament building. On 29 April, Pravda reported the establishment of Soviet power in Baku. That same day, Mikhail Frunze, commander of the Turkestan front, ordered the dispatch of the cruiser Avstralia and a landing detachment to arm the "rebellious workers of Baku."

In May 1920, XI Army soldiers and commanders, including Kirov, Mikoyan, Ordzhonikidze, and Levandovsky, gathered at Baku's railway station. XI Red Army Commander M. K. Levandovsky arrived in Baku after the armored trains. Noting the Azerbaijani Revolutionary Committee's weak support base, he ordered the expedited arrival of rifle and cavalry units. Speaking directly with N. A. Nesterovsky, commander of the 28th Rifle Division, Levandovsky stated:

Soviet power has been established in Baku. The Revolutionary Committee has no real strength. The situation demands the rapid movement of army units to their designated areas. Inform the commander of the 32nd Division and General Smirnov that all cavalry should proceed urgently, and infantry must advance swiftly.

On 30 April, the 244th Regiment of the 24th Rifle Division was the first unit to enter Baku, followed by units of the 32nd Rifle Division and the 290th Muslim Rifle Regiment, formed in Astrakhan. A burial ceremony for the Red Army soldiers who fell in battle was held that day, with their remains interred in Freedom Square.

The Volga-Caspian Fleet arrived at Baku harbor, including the gunboats Kars and Ardahan, the reconnaissance ships Astarabad and Goytepe, the transports Oryol and Araz, and several smaller vessels. This significantly strengthened the Volga-Caspian Fleet, which was subsequently renamed the Caspian Military Fleet under the command of F. F. Raskolnikov.

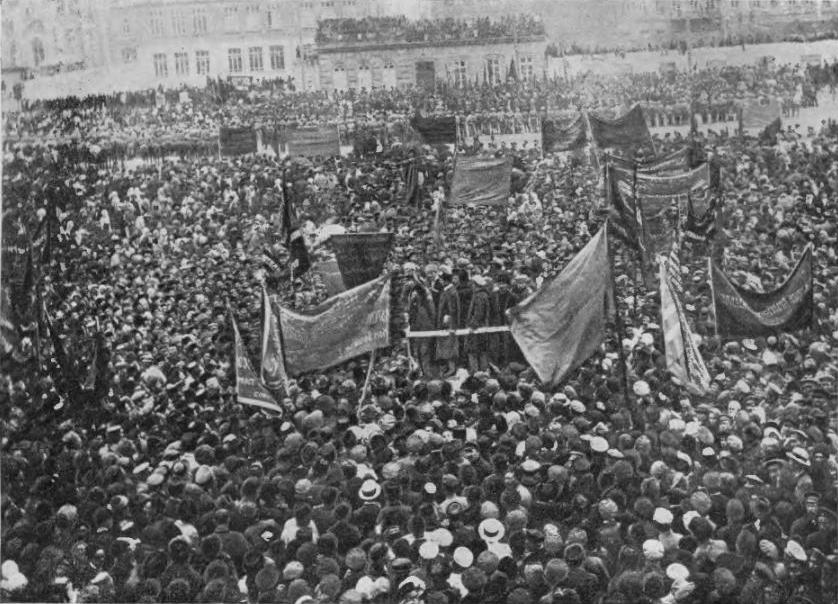
Rally of workers and Red Army units in Baku, 1920.

=== Completion of the invasion ===
As Soviet armored trains advanced toward Baku, the 2nd Cavalry Corps moved toward Qusar, Quba, Shamakhi, and Kurdamir, securing the operation from the west and cutting off the Musavat Army's routes to retreat to Ganja. At 4:00 a.m. on 27 April, the 7th Cavalry Division crossed the Samur River in the Maharramkend-Yaraq-Qazmalar region, capturing the village of Qullar, the first settlement in Azerbaijani territory occupied by the 11th Red Army. Units of A. M. Khmelkov's division engaged in combat and later encircled and disarmed the Quba Infantry Regiment near Qusar. The Qusar garrison surrendered without resistance.

Following the units of the 2nd Cavalry Corps, regiments of the 32nd Infantry Division advanced. At 4:00 p.m., the 38th Cavalry Regiment occupied Quba, and by 6:00 p.m., the 39th Cavalry Regiment reached the city and joined the 38th Regiment. Quba fell to the 11th Red Army without resistance, resulting in the capture of six Azerbaijani officers and 60 soldiers. Two mountain guns were among the spoils of war. By 7:00 p.m., the 40th Cavalry Regiment had captured Tochadi village near Quba. Over the course of 27 April, the 7th Cavalry Division took 31 officers and approximately 600 soldiers as prisoners.

On 28 April, the village of Davachi was brought under control. Crossing the Khaldan Pass in the Greater Caucasus mountain range, the division seized the mountainous village of Astrakhan-Bazar on 29 April and redirected its forces toward Shamakhi and Aghsu. On 30 April, the division entered Shamakhi. Across the region, Azerbaijani soldiers surrendered en masse to the Red Army, with their numbers exceeding 5,000 by the end of 30 April.

From the early days of Soviet rule, local governance bodies—village, district, and regional revolutionary committees (revkoms)—began to be established in towns and districts. On the morning of 28 April, Samad Agha Agamalioglu contacted Ganja, Gazakh, Tovuz, Shamakhi, Lankaran, and other districts from the Azerbaijan Revolutionary Committee (Azrevkom) headquarters to announce the coup in Baku and the establishment of Soviet rule there. Upon learning of the events in Baku, the Ganja district committee formed a gubernatorial revkom under F. Aliyev's leadership and issued an ultimatum to the governor to transfer authority. By the evening of 29 April, Governor Khudadat Bey Rafibeyov signed the act transferring power in Ganja Governorate to the revkom. By midday on 28 April, the armored train Timofey Ulyantsev reached Kurdamir station, later occupying Yevlakh in the evening, effectively connecting the central regions of the country with the Karabakh and Shaki-Zaqatala zones.

As the armored trains neared Ganja, they engaged in a major battle with a Musavat detachment attempting to block their path. On 1 May, Soviet armored trains and the landing units of the 28th Infantry Division seized Ganja station and the railway district of the city. The following day, the regiments of the 2nd Cavalry Corps and the Taman Cavalry Division took control of the city and surrounding areas. Advancing south from Ganja, units of the 11th Red Army swiftly captured the Zurnabad-Yelenendorf-Hajikend region, reaching the Lesser Caucasus mountains. In the Shamkir district, the communist cell declared Soviet rule on 30 April. In the village of Zayam, a district revkom was formed under the leadership of Salim Aliyev. On 3 May, Azrevkom decided to establish revkoms in all district centers of Azerbaijan.

On 2 May, the commander of the 11th Red Army, M. K. Levandovsky, ordered the 2nd Cavalry Corps to take control of the Azerbaijan-Georgia border and incorporate a battalion of the 2nd Zaqatala Infantry Regiment of the Azerbaijani Army into its command. On 5 May, the Timofey Ulyantsev armored train reached the Georgian border after capturing the Agstafa and Poylu stations. Meanwhile, cavalry units occupied Gazakh. Armed clashes immediately erupted between Red Army soldiers and Georgian forces at the Azerbaijan-Georgia border, continuing intermittently from 1 to 15 May. The Red Army repelled Menshevik attempts to cross the Kura River, forcing them to retreat. On 18 and 20 May, Dashnak forces violated the southern border of Gazakh but were also pushed back by Soviet forces.

On 29 April, Azrevkom issued an appeal to Azerbaijani Army soldiers to support the Red Army in the struggle for Soviet power. On the same day, revkoms were established in Lankaran and Nukha districts. In Lankaran, the local Communist Party formed a Military Revolutionary Committee for the district, following orders from Interior Commissar Hamid Sultanov issued on 28 April. The Lankaran revkom consisted of seven members: H. Mammadzadeh, I. Ponomaryov, M. D. Habibullahi, A. Talishinski, M. Beydemirov, A. Yunusov, and A. Mammadov. On 3 May, warships, including the destroyer Deryatelniy under I. S. Isakov's command, approached Lankaran, deploying a naval landing force into the city. The following day, Astara, located on the Iranian border, was occupied.

On 30 April, communists in Shusha organized a district revkom and declared control of governance. Units of the 32nd Infantry Division concentrated in the Yevlakh area and, supported by regiments of the 2nd Cavalry Corps, began advancing toward Karabakh in early May. On 8 May, units of the 32nd Infantry Division entered Barda, followed by Agdam on 9 May, and Tartar on 10 May. On 12 May, units of the 11th Red Army occupied Shusha. The Armenian-language Kommunist newspaper in Baku wrote in its first issue: "In Shusha, a grand reception was organized for the valiant Red Army. The population came out to welcome the Red soldiers with bread and salt."

On 11 May, forward detachments of the 18th Cavalry Division reached Zaqatala. That day, a district revkom was established in Kariagin district. The following day, the 39th and 40th regiments of the 7th Cavalry Division occupied Balakan. Within approximately 10 to 15 days, Soviet rule was established throughout Azerbaijan, with the exception of Nakhchivan, where it was not established until late July.

== The role of Kemalists and Turkish officers ==
The First World War ended in complete disaster for the Ottoman Empire. Immediately after the signing of the Mudros Armistice, the Entente Powers began occupying the most critical military-strategic regions of the former empire, including Istanbul, and effectively partitioning the state. British, French, and Italian troops deployed forces to occupy various parts of the empire. In May 1919, the Greek army landed in Izmir, prompting the launch of a national liberation movement in Turkey under the leadership of Mustafa Kemal Pasha. In this struggle, the Kemalists sought assistance from Soviet Russia. The South Caucasus states, which the British intended to use as a buffer between the "Bolshevik" and "Kemalist" revolutions, acted as a barrier between the two. As early as November 1919, Turkish officers stationed in Azerbaijan convened an unauthorized meeting and pledged to fully support the Communist Party in its fight against the Musavat government. Some Turks serving under the Musavatists, such as Hulusi Mammadzadeh, an officer of the Shirvan Regiment that formed the core of the Lankaran garrison in late 1919 and early 1920, engaged in propaganda among soldiers in favor of Soviet rule.

Once it became clear that Britain would not send troops to create an anti-Bolshevik "Caucasus barrier" and that it would not respond to Turkey's national liberation movement, the leaders of this movement decisively turned toward rapprochement with the Bolsheviks. In an encrypted message dated 6 February 1920, Mustafa Kemal Pasha informed Kazım Karabekir Pasha that such a "barrier" represented a plan to destroy Turkey and that they were compelled to take drastic measures to prevent it. He further instructed, "Mobilize officially or unofficially on the Eastern Front and begin dismantling the ‘Caucasus barrier’ from the rear. Establish urgent connections with the new Caucasian governments, especially the Muslim governments of Azerbaijan and Dagestan, to understand their stance on the Entente's plan. If the Caucasian peoples decide to obstruct us, agree to attack them jointly with the Bolsheviks...."

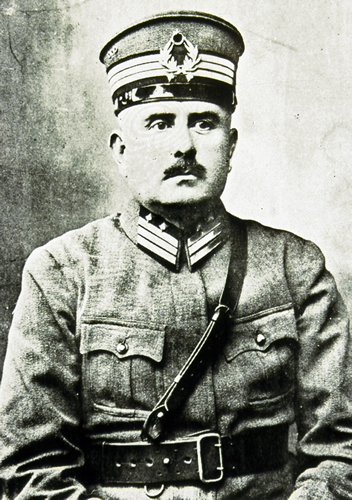
Kâzım Karabekir

In a letter dated March 17, Brigadier General Kazım Karabekir Pasha, commander of the Eastern Army of the Turkish Grand National Assembly, wrote to Halil Pasha and Nuru Pasha, stating that “it is essential for the Bolsheviks to appear near Turkey's borders, even if only with small forces, to advance into Azerbaijan and immediately seize the entire Caucasus. Together with the Azerbaijanis, they should reach Turkey's borders and act in favor of Turkish interests. Facilitating the establishment of Bolshevik rule in Azerbaijan, Dagestan, and Georgia would be highly beneficial...”. The Turkish side proposed using the units Halil Pasha had formed in Dagestan to seize Azerbaijan. The Caucasus Regional Committee noted that “Halil Pasha's use as commander of the Muslim unit leading our forces, along with his reputation and influence within the Azerbaijani government, could save the oil fields and reserves from destruction.” The Executive Committee of the Turkish National Movement ordered all Turks in Baku to comply with all orders from the Caucasus Regional Committee.

From the spring of 1920 onward, representatives of the Turkish Kemalists engaged with the leadership of Soviet Russia, viewing it as an ally in their struggle against the Entente. These relations were established through Azerbaijan. The annual report of the People's Commissariat for Foreign Affairs of the RSFSR noted that "a group of their supporters contributed to the coup and to the invitation of Russian troops by the revolutionary Azerbaijani government." In early June 1920, the People's Commissariat for Foreign Affairs of the RSFSR received a letter dated 26 April, addressed to the RSFSR government on behalf of Mustafa Kemal Pasha, Chairman of the Grand National Assembly of Turkey convened in Ankara. The letter stated that Turkey "commits to fighting against the imperialist governments alongside Soviet Russia to liberate all the oppressed, to influence the Azerbaijani Republic to join the circle of Soviet states, and to participate in the struggle against imperialists in the Caucasus. Turkey also expresses its readiness to resist imperialist enemies attacking Turkey and hopes for Soviet Russia's assistance in this fight."

Shortly before the Sovietization of Azerbaijan, on 15 April 1920, Kazım Karabekir Pasha and Ali Agha Shikhlinski signed a secret military convention in addition to a confidential agreement concluded between Azerbaijan and Turkey in Istanbul in November 1919. This convention stipulated that Turkey would provide military assistance to Azerbaijan if it were attacked by its neighbors. However, in practice, this agreement had no tangible effect. On the contrary, a group of Turkish officers led by Khalil Pasha actively participated in the advance of Red Army units. They conducted propaganda among the local population, urging them not to resist the Red Army. The atmosphere of agitation influenced the non-Bolshevik political forces in the country as well. For instance, the declarations by Turkish spies and officers regarding the necessity of creating a corridor between revolutionary Russia and revolutionary Turkey had a strong impact on both Ittihadists and left-wing Musavatists. Mahammad Amin Rasulzade wrote:

Some of the Ottoman Turks active in Baku unknowingly misled people with these words: ‘The approaching Red Army is led by a Turk named Nijat Bey. The regiments of this army are composed of Turks. Many soldiers are arriving from the Volga Turks. This army is fighting against uncompromising enemies and advancing to help Anatolia. Resistance to this army will not only hinder Turkey's liberation but will also be tantamount to betrayal in terms of the greater Turkish unity and the Muslim community.

On 3 May 1920, a proclamation titled "From the Turkish Communist Bolsheviks to the Azerbaijani People" was disseminated, calling on Azerbaijanis to support the new government. On 14 August, speaking before the Grand National Assembly of Turkey, its Chairman Mustafa Kemal referred to the Red Army's breakthrough on the Eastern Front, its unimpeded advance in the North Caucasus, and the occupation of Azerbaijan as "our objective, influence, and work."

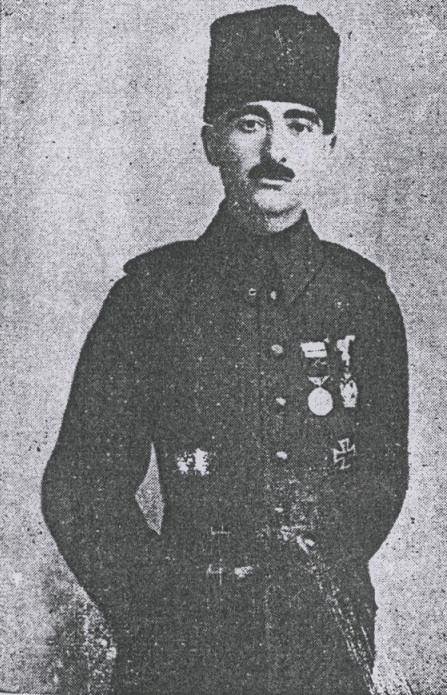
Halil Pasha

== Consequences ==
=== Reaction and perception ===
On the morning of 29 April 1920, the Izvestia of the Provisional Revolutionary Committee of the Azerbaijan SSR newspaper, published on 28 April, characterized the events of the night of 27–28 April as "the greatest event in the history of the East."

A. Todorsky, who at the time was a brigade commander in the 28th Rifle Division, recalled that the workers of Baku welcomed the regiments of the Red Army with enthusiasm, "offering us bouquets of flowers and showing great hospitality." Similarly, Mikoyan, who arrived by armored train, wrote about the genuine camaraderie between the residents of Baku and the soldiers of the Red Army, describing scenes of "embraces and a general celebratory atmosphere." In a telegram sent to Lenin on 16 May, Nariman Narimanov stated:

In Baku... the revolutionary spirit is alive. The Red Army conducted itself impeccably... The population sincerely welcomes Soviet Russia and hopes that it will assist in consolidating the young independent Soviet Azerbaijan.

However, other witnesses described the Bolshevik sentiment among the local population as unstable, referring to it as an "instinctive and sympathetic mood."

The entire operation concluded with remarkable speed. According to Gazanfar Musabeyov's account, "the command was surprised by such a swift and bloodless success." On the morning of 28 April, near Baku, in the White City area, S. A. Monastyryov, whose aircraft had landed due to engine trouble, initially believed he had fallen into the hands of Musavatists until workers approached him and informed him that Soviet power had been established in the city.

On 30 April 1920, London's The Times wrote:

The revolution in the Azerbaijani Republic, which has resulted in the triumph of Bolshevik influence, was not unexpected. Our special correspondent in the Middle East had warned that Baku might soon fall into Bolshevik hands. His predictions were realized much sooner than anticipated.

On 1 May 1920, a large demonstration was held in Baku. Telegrams congratulating the establishment of the Azerbaijan Soviet Republic were sent to the capital. On 5 May, Lenin sent a congratulatory telegram on behalf of the Council of People's Commissars of the RSFSR to the Council of People's Commissars of the Azerbaijan SSR. This telegram referred to Azerbaijan's independence four times. The day the telegram was received in Baku was declared a holiday. A special edition of the newspaper Red Azerbaijan, featuring portraits of Lenin and Narimanov, was published. This day was widely regarded by the masses as the day Soviet Russia recognized the Azerbaijan SSR.

While some expressed satisfaction with the change in power, others harbored entirely opposing sentiments. For instance, Mahammad Amin Rasulzade wrote:

Regrettably, we forgot our principle that once raised, the flag must never be lowered. Fearing for our lives and property, we replaced our independence flag with a piece of red cloth.

In April of the same year, Sheikh Khiyabani, who led an anti-shah uprising in Tabriz (Iranian Azerbaijan), initially viewed the establishment of Soviet power in Azerbaijan positively. However, his attitude toward the leadership of Soviet Azerbaijan soon changed radically when he realized that "the final word in Baku belonged to the Russians and that they harbored expansionist aims."

On 20 May 1920, the Iranian government sent a note to the RSFSR government, stating that "the Iranian government recognizes Azerbaijan as an independent state" while simultaneously welcoming the declaration of the Azerbaijan SSR. The note affirmed that the declaration "truly demonstrates the Soviet government's commitment to the liberation of small nations and the restoration of their rights."

=== Historical significance ===
The Azerbaijan Democratic Republic lasted for 23 months before the establishment of a Soviet governance model (under the leadership of the Communist Party) was swiftly implemented. The raid conducted by an armored train group stands out as a rare event in the history of warfare. During World War I and the Russian Civil War, armored trains carried out an unprecedented deep raid of 200 kilometers into enemy rear lines. As a result of this operation, Baku and the Absheron Peninsula were captured in just 23 hours. For their successful execution of the operation, Yefremov, the detachment's commissar I.G. Dudin, four commanders, and six fighters of the leading armored train were awarded the Order of the Red Banner.

The Soviet victory and the proclamation of the independent Azerbaijan SSR held significant political-strategic and economic importance. During the Soviet era, it was widely asserted that the capture of Baku thwarted the plans of the Entente and strengthened the Red Army's rear. Additionally, the support of the Red Army secured the Soviet authority's decisive victory in Azerbaijan and reinforced revolutionary forces across the entire Caucasus region. In November 1920, during an interview with a Pravda correspondent, Joseph Stalin remarked:

The significance of the Caucasus for the revolution lies not only in its being a source of raw materials, fuel, and provisions but also in its strategic position between Europe and Asia, particularly between Russia and Turkey, as well as the presence of key economic-strategic routes (Batumi-Baku, Batumi-Tabriz, and Batumi-Tabriz-Erzurum). These factors are acknowledged by the Entente. They have already seized control of Istanbul—the gateway to the Black Sea—and seek to maintain an open route to the East via the Caucasus. The central question is who will finally secure dominance in the Caucasus and exploit its oil and key routes to the depths of Asia: the revolution or the Entente? The liberation of Azerbaijan significantly weakened the Entente's position in the Caucasus.

The Baku operation marked the beginning of the Communist Party's expansion of power throughout the South Caucasus. Just days after Azerbaijan was Sovietized, an uprising erupted in neighboring Armenia, while attempted coups were suppressed by governments in Georgia. Some Armenian insurgents retreated to Soviet Azerbaijan, where they formed the Armenian Red Insurgent Regiment (the 1st Kazakh Insurgent Regiment), which participated in the overthrow of the Armenian government and the establishment of Soviet power in Armenia. During Georgia's Sovietization, Azerbaijan's Combined Military School provided support to Georgian insurgents in the Poylu direction as part of a troop group aiding the operation.

The establishment of Soviet control over Baku's oil reserves by Soviet Russia resolved the country's fuel supply issues. According to the Azerbaijani Soviet Encyclopedia, the Baku operation secured the country's oil supply. Notably, the Sovietization of Azerbaijan coincided with the Polish Army's offensive on Ukraine. On April 29, Lenin addressed the Congress of All-Russia Glass and Porcelain Workers, describing the situation as follows:

Yesterday, we received two pieces of news: the first was very distressing. The Polish government decided to break off peace talks and launch broader military operations. Poland has already seized Zhytomyr and is advancing towards Kyiv. On the other hand, we received news from Baku yesterday that indicates an improvement in Soviet Russia's situation. We know that our industry has been paralyzed due to a lack of fuel, and now we hear that the proletariat in Baku has taken power and overthrown the Azerbaijani government. This means we now have an economic base capable of revitalizing our entire industry.

=== "Week of Plunder" ===
Jörg Baberowski, in his work, notes that the Bolsheviks entered Azerbaijan as occupiers, transforming the republic into a landscape of killings and plunder. In the days following the occupation, widespread looting broke out in the city and lasted for several days. Residents of Baku referred to this period as the "Week of Plunder." Looters raided homes and offices, forcibly removing gold jewelry from women's ears and necks, and stealing valuable furniture and belongings.

Following the occupation, the Bolsheviks confiscated private property and looted valuable belongings. Confiscated houses or those whose owners had been killed were often occupied by Bolshevik officials and soldiers. At a meeting of the Baku Executive Committee on 23 December 1920, it was reported that the entire city of Baku was overcrowded with military personnel, with 10,000–12,000 soldiers living in private residences.

The Special Department of the XI Red Army and other punitive institutions intensified the persecution and arrest of members and leaders of political parties and various organizations in Azerbaijan. They isolated and executed representatives of the Azerbaijani intelligentsia, sending hundreds of individuals to remote prison camps such as the Solovetsky Islands, Suzdal, and Novgorod. Reports indicate that within the first two days of the occupation, 300 individuals were executed at the Bayil Prison.

Arbitrary arrests, persecution, and the looting of cities eventually led to numerous uprisings across the country. The Red Army soldiers, under the pretext of expropriating the property of the wealthy, often raided homes and later organized extravagant gatherings in luxury restaurants. After consuming alcohol, they frequently caused disturbances for the local population. In response to the disorderly conduct and drunkenness of the XI Red Army soldiers, the army held alcohol vendors accountable. For instance, on 23 June 1923, the head of the Baku garrison ordered that individuals identified as selling alcohol should be declared enemies of the worker-peasant government and executed without trial or investigation.

The misconduct of Red Army soldiers reached such an extent that the commander of the XI Red Army, Mikhail Levandovsky, in his Order No. 269 dated 8 June 1920, acknowledged their involvement in looting and robbery. He further noted that soldiers frequently desecrated mosques and other sites sacred to Muslims, often enlisting the participation of Armenians in such actions. Levandovsky emphasized that these incidents provoked resistance among the local population and called on his soldiers to refrain from acts of cruelty and favoritism toward specific nationalities, particularly Armenians.

At the Second Congress of the Azerbaijani Communist (Bolshevik) Party held on 16–23 October 1920, Nariman Narimanov suggested that during the expropriation campaigns targeting the bourgeoisie, local customs and the psychology of the Muslim population should be taken into account. He argued that expropriation should be directed at factories, banks, theaters, and other major institutions, rather than taking men's suits, women's jewelry, or, as some "radical comrades demanded, even undergarments".

Nariman Narimanov arrived in Baku on 16 May with the goal of establishing a republic that could serve as a model for the East. However, upon witnessing the "Week of Plunder," the lawlessness of the XI Army, and the widespread looting, he submitted his first resignation letter shortly thereafter. In his letter to Stalin titled "On the History of Our Revolution in the Outskirts", Narimanov described the situation:

At Bilajary, some comrades met me, seemingly overjoyed at my arrival. 'Perhaps your arrival will put an end to the disgraceful events that have been happening,' they said. I calmed them down and asked for their assistance in the difficult tasks ahead. The Presidium of the Revolutionary Committee at that time consisted of myself (as chairman), Mirza Davud Huseynov (as deputy), and Gara Garayev as a member. I was greeted with words like, 'Azerbaijan is being completely plundered, and executions are carried out indiscriminately.' These words came from some comrades (neither Gara Garayev nor Mirza Davud Huseynov were among them). After familiarizing myself with the situation, I convened a meeting of the Presidium of the Revolutionary Committee and invited Comrade Pankratov, who was effectively in charge of everything at the time. I proposed that no one should be executed without the sanction of the Revolutionary Committee. Mirza Davud Huseynov and Gara Garayev opposed this proposal. As a result, everything continued as it had before.

On 20 September 1920, Behbud Agha Shahtakhtinsky, Azerbaijan's representative in Moscow, wrote to Lenin, detailing the dire state of affairs:

The Red Army behaves in a reactionary manner, and astonishing reports are coming in from the regions. The situation has escalated to the point where women and girls are being openly assaulted... The Azerbaijani peasants ask and beg for only one thing: take everything at once and leave them alone, sparing them from daily intrusions into their homes. The current condition of Azerbaijani peasants is extraordinarily dire. They cannot even obtain kerosene, as every cart carrying it to their villages is confiscated by the Red Army en route. Peasants are refusing to sow their fields. Azerbaijan, which once lived off its own bread, is now breadless, while starving Georgia and Armenia are now well-supplied with bread.

On 22 February 1921, an order signed by Nariman Narimanov was issued to prevent unauthorized searches and confiscation of household property.

On 1 May 1920, 67,528 poods of oil were sent to Russia aboard the ship "Buniyad," and 76,697 poods of mazut were transported aboard the ship "Rus."

In the tenth chapter titled "Red Imperialism" of his work "The Republic of Azerbaijan", Mahammad Amin Rasulzadeh notes that, following the Bolsheviks' entry into Baku, a "week of plunder" ensued. During this period, in addition to jewels, gold, silver, valuables, and cash looted from banks and goods transported to Astrakhan, they took 300 million poods (4.8 billion kilograms) of oil, 750,000 poods (12 million kilograms) of cotton, and large amounts of silk.

Between 30 April – 2 May 1920, 12 steamships departed from Baku to Astrakhan, transporting a total of 1.3 million poods of oil. The Volga-Caspian fleet delivered 15 million poods of oil and oil products to Russia in May and 21.2 million poods in June. From the April occupation to the end of October 1920, a total of 145 million poods of oil was sent from Azerbaijan to Russia.

During the week of plunder, many intellectuals, millionaires, politicians, and military figures were executed. Murtuza Mukhtarov, after firing at two Bolshevik intruders who stormed into his apartment at the corner of Vrangel (now Ahmad Javad) and Persidsky (now Murtuza Mukhtarov) streets, shot one of them, a soldier named Anosov. He then took his own life with a second bullet.

According to a report issued on 30 December 1920, by the Extraordinary Commission for Improving Workers' Living Conditions, 225 poods of valuable items—10 poods in gold and the rest in silver—were officially confiscated from the city's population. Additionally, numerous diamonds and precious stones, as well as 4,000 carpets, were seized.

Even Anastas Mikoyan, in his memoirs, mentions that as he departed from Baku, the Azerbaijan Communist Party Central Committee gifted him a blanket, pillows, and a confiscated gold women's watch.

At the First All-Azerbaijan Congress of Workers, Peasants, Red Soldiers, and Sailors' Deputies held in May 1921, Nariman Narimanov addressed many questions from delegates. In response to one question, he stated:

Questions are being raised about the confiscation of bourgeois property. Of course, this must be carried out, but it should be done in an orderly manner. If you know of a bourgeois somewhere, you must take everything they have. They should only be left with a spoon and a plate. However, we hear that in some cities, this has been handled very poorly. At least here, the process was conducted under the supervision of experienced comrades. For example, earrings were being ripped straight from people's ears, and we wondered how the population could endure such treatment. Taking into account the known psychology of the Muslim masses, an order was issued not to confiscate jewelry from Muslim women. Yet some of our reckless comrades not only confiscated the jewelry but directly tore the earrings off from the ears.

=== The fate of the victors and "class enemies" ===
After the establishment of Soviet power in Baku, persecution against "class enemies," supporters of the old regime, and intellectuals began immediately. Arrests were frequently carried out without cause; representatives of the "bourgeoisie" were beaten and looted on the streets, while real or suspected opponents of the new regime were taken to Nargin Island and executed there.

Attempts by members of the government to flee the city also failed. Turkish soldiers apprehended the group and handed them over to the headquarters of the Red Army, which arrived in Baku on 29 April. Later, Ordzhonikidze and Kirov noted that on May Day, the awarding of the Order of the Red Banner to "the Azerbaijani Naval Commissar and a Turkish [Azerbaijani] communist who, during the coup, seized the station with a group of soldiers and prevented the government from escaping" was met with special recognition.

Communist Mammad Tahirov and two of his associates arrested the military governor of Baku, Major General M. G. Tlekhas. During the days of the April occupation, up to 400 foreign diplomats, military personnel, and trade and economic representatives—including 32 British officers—were also arrested in Baku. Among those detained was Bruce Fraser, the First Lord of the British Admiralty.

The day after the overthrow of the Azerbaijani government, Justice Minister Aliheydar Garayev proposed to Teymur Aliyev, the chairman of the Supreme Revolutionary Tribunal, to take up cases concerning the killings of Mir Fattah Musevi, Ashum Aliyev, and Ali Bayramov. In the Ali Bayramov case, the tribunal sentenced ten individuals, including Baku's military governor M. Tlekhas and the city police chief Rustam Mirzayev, to execution. Several others, including Shafi bey Rustambeyov, a member of the Central Committee of the Musavat Party, were sentenced to death in absentia. Engineer Abulfaz bey, the director of the Naftalan Society, was also executed by the AzCheka for allegedly orchestrating the assassination of Khanlar Safaraliyev in 1907.

In early May, the AzCheka sentenced 21 White Guards, including Generals Sergey Rudnev, Pashkovski, Razdorski, Yudenovich, Dmitriev, and Nikolay Tetruyev, to execution, citing accusations of killing communists, captured Red Army soldiers, and civilians, as well as suppressing revolutionary uprisings. In July, twelve officers of the Azerbaijani army, including General Ibrahim bey Usubov, commander of the Baku defense district, were executed on Nargin Island. This execution was later deemed a mistake. The Special Department arrested Major General Vasily Kargaleteli (Shapur), who was also sentenced to execution. However, he was released from detention on the guarantee of Budu Mdivani, who subsequently recommended him as Chief of Staff of the Iranian Red Army in Rasht.

The lives of some state officials who had held secondary positions under the Musavat regime were spared, as the revolutionaries needed their assistance. For example, Narimanov intervened to protect the son of Baku millionaire Haji Zeynalabdin Taghiyev, and Stalin prevented the execution of M. A. Rasulzadeh, leader of the Musavat Party.

The fate of officials from the Azerbaijan Democratic Republic varied. Some, such as Fatali Khan Khoyski, Khalil bey Khasmammadov, and Khosrov Sultanov, fled the country. Others, including Mammad Yusif Jafarov, Mahammad Hasan Hajinski, Jamo bey Hajinski, Mehdi bey Hajinski, Ahmad bey Pepinov, and Khudadat bey Malik-Aslanov, remained in Azerbaijan and continued working in various state institutions. Many of them, however, were subjected to repression, primarily during the 1930s. A similar fate befell Azerbaijani revolutionaries and active participants in the struggle for Soviet power. During the Great Purge, figures such as Hamid Sultanov, Chingiz Ildirim, Mirza Davud Huseynov, and Aliheydar Garayev were executed in Azerbaijan. Mikhail Yefremov died during the Great Patriotic War. While the right-wing leaders of the Musavat Party fled abroad, the left wing was allowed to continue its activities. After the AzCheka intensified its repressions, Musavat members voluntarily dissolved the party in 1923, as their activities were rendered meaningless under the national program declared by the Soviets. After the Soviet takeover, Musavat Party officials who fled the country initially relocated to neighboring Georgia. In Tbilisi, they organized the "Committee for the Liberation of Azerbaijan."

=== Further events ===
After the establishment of Soviet power, the Enzeli operation was conducted to seize the remnants of the White Guard fleet in the Caspian Sea. In May, a cavalry division crossed the Iranian border from the direction of Lankaran, captured the city of Astara in Iran, and continued advancing towards Enzeli. Alongside the Enzeli operation, Soviet forces carried out an armed raid into the territory of Iranian Azerbaijan. Military units of Soviet Azerbaijan, such as the 7th Shirvan Infantry Regiment, participated in these operations.

The challenges faced by the previous government now fell on Soviet Azerbaijan. Under the leadership of Azrevkom (the Azerbaijan Revolutionary Committee), the Azerbaijani army continued fighting against Georgia and Armenia for some time. On 7 May, a peace treaty was signed between Soviet Russia and Georgia, followed by an additional agreement on 12 May. On 2 June, the two Soviet states (Russia and Azerbaijan), on the one hand, and Armenia, on the other, reached an agreement on a ceasefire in Karabakh, Zangezur, Nakhchivan, and the Kazakh district. However, conflicts among them persisted until December 1920.

In the initial period, the Azerbaijani army was preserved. Its units served as the basis for forming the divisions and units of the newly established Azerbaijani Red Army. However, after the Ganja uprising, all such formations were dissolved. Some high-ranking military officers, such as Aliagha Shikhlinski and Samed bey Mehmandarov, began working in the new government institutions.

The "Temporary Military Revolutionary Committee of Azerbaijan," in one of its declarations, outlined the primary objectives as safeguarding Azerbaijan's independence, implementing socialist reforms, establishing close ties with Russia, and achieving other goals. The new authorities initiated efforts to establish a new state structure and socialist economy (at the time, the policy of war communism was being implemented). Decrees were issued to confiscate lands owned by beys, khans, and religious endowments, redistributing them to peasants free of charge, and to nationalize large industrial enterprises. Azrevkom abolished all class distinctions, restrictions, privileges, titles, and ranks, along with the previous regime's state administration structures. On 19 May 1921, the First All-Azerbaijan Soviet Congress adopted Azerbaijan's first constitution, modeled on the 1918 RSFSR Constitution.

One month after the capture of Baku, as the Azerbaijani population began recovering from the shock of the country's rapid occupation, discontent started to emerge. The opposition was neither united nor organized but consisted of two main anti-Soviet political activity centers: the National Liberation Committee, established by exiles in Tbilisi, and a clandestine group formed by young Musavat members. The main challenges faced by the communist regime included widespread confiscation of foodstuffs, arbitrary actions of the Soviet government, and the spontaneous reactions of the population against its aggressive communism. Discontent also spread to the Azerbaijani army, which opposed its reorganization along the lines of the Soviet army, resented the dismissal of officers, and was angered by the disbandment of units. The decision to dismiss the Ganja garrison commander and his staff officers led to the first and bloodiest Azerbaijani uprising. Thus, albeit belatedly, the true fight for Azerbaijan began. Following Ganja, uprisings occurred in other regions of Azerbaijan, which were not fully suppressed until 1924.

After the establishment of Soviet power, Azerbaijan maintained its independence. According to Dr. P.F. Gozelev, the Bolsheviks, observing the reluctance of Eastern countries to adopt revolutionary reforms, abandoned the idea of preserving Azerbaijan's independence in line with their political interests. The first step toward the loss of independence was the creation of the Transcaucasian Soviet Federative Socialist Republic (ZSFSR) in 1921, a process that culminated in the establishment of the USSR on 30 December 1922.

== Evaluation and characteristics of events ==
In the 1920s, literature published in Azerbaijan referred to the events of the period as the "April Revolution." Under this designation, 28 April 1920, was commemorated in Azerbaijan. For instance, in May 1935, the resolution of the Plenum of the Central Committee of the Azerbaijan Communist Party (ACP CC) was titled "On Preparations for the 15th Anniversary of the April Revolution in Azerbaijan." However, starting from the period of the 1937–1938 repressions, the term "April Revolution" gradually disappeared from party and Soviet documents, as well as from the pages of published materials.

According to American historian Firuz Kazemzadeh, the entry of the 11th Red Army into Azerbaijan before any official request for assistance and the organization of the Baku Bolshevik uprising in close coordination with it indicate that the overthrow of the Musavat government occurred "due to the power of a resurgent Russia." Kazemzadeh argues that the purpose of the telegrams sent by the Azerbaijan Revolutionary Committee (Azrevkom) to Moscow was to present the government's overthrow as the work of local Bolsheviks rather than as a Russian invasion. He asserts that the nationalist appeal of Musavat was so strong that no internal force in Azerbaijan could oppose it, and only an external power could defeat it and bring the communists to power.

Charles Warren Hostler, Michael Smith, and Jörg Baberowski describe the actions of the 11th Red Army as an "invasion." Similarly, S. Enders Wimbush noted that the Azerbaijani state was forcibly conquered by the Red Army. Russian author A. B. Shirokorad noted:

The intervention of Soviet troops in Azerbaijan followed the standard Bolshevik scenario: a local revolutionary committee (revkom) initiates an actual or "virtual" workers' uprising and immediately calls for assistance from the Red Army. This pattern was employed for over 50 years—for example, in the interventions in Hungary in 1956 and Czechoslovakia in 1968.

Soviet authors, who rejected the theory of Soviet Russia's "military intervention," claimed that Soviet power in the three Transcaucasian republics was established by local elements. They argued that the role of the RSFSR's military units was to "provide fraternal, internationalist assistance to the peoples of Russia in their struggle for social and national liberation, as well as to protect the struggle of the Transcaucasian working people for independence from the intervention of imperialist powers like the Entente and Turkey." Soviet Azerbaijani historian Jamil Guliyev similarly asserted that "Soviet power was not imposed on the Azerbaijani people from outside by foreign forces, as claimed by bourgeois historians—it triumphed through the revolutionary struggle of social forces that had emerged from within the people."

German historian Jörg Baberowski notes that conflicts in rural areas, which Soviet historians interpreted as contradictions between landowners and peasants, were actually confrontations between peasant communities competing over land and pastures. Baberowski observes that local landlords sometimes incited their peasants against those of neighboring villages. He emphasizes that only a few landlords and nobles in the Baku and Elizavetpol Governorates were wealthy, while most shared the peasants' dire economic conditions. Baberowski concludes that there was no organized peasant movement during this period.

According to the Polish historian Tadeusz Swietochowski, the collapse of the Musavat government was not due to the lack of support from the broad masses but because "the masses continued to remain at the level of communal consciousness" and displayed indifference toward local or foreign authorities. Azerbaijani historian R. Mustafazadeh, on the other hand, identifies the most critical factor in the fall of the Azerbaijan Democratic Republic (ADR) as "the strategic goals of this region being tied to the rapprochement between Kemalist Turkey and Soviet Russia."

American researcher Michael Smith, analyzing Azerbaijani national consciousness, notes that the people's religious sentiments did not transform into genuine nationalism. He adds that "in the Shia consciousness of the people, the ADR was not perceived as the embodiment of the end of the world or the culmination of history, as this consciousness was overshadowed by economic devastation, mass unemployment, food shortages, and epidemics." Swietochowski further argues that:

The idea of a national Azerbaijani state did not take deep root among the various layers of the population; the term 'nationalism' was either not understood by these layers or was perceived as a curse or offensive term. The communists skillfully exploited this situation and conducted propaganda against the Azerbaijan Democratic Republic. This explains why the republic was overthrown so easily and painlessly.

Russian historian V. M. Mukhanov highlights the extremely limited support for the government and its policies among the population. According to him, one indicator of this was the lack of fierce resistance against the Red Army's entry into Baku and its surrounding areas, as well as the absence of widespread anti-Soviet uprisings. While anti-government uprisings orchestrated by Moscow failed in Georgia and Armenia, the Azerbaijani government was defeated on its first attempt. Mukhanov sees this as evidence of the government's weak position.

On 26 April 1991, a scientific-theoretical conference titled "The Establishment of Soviet Power in Azerbaijan: The Dialectics of National Statehood and Social Progress" was held at the Baku Higher Party School. In his opening speech, philologist and candidate of historical sciences R. G. Agayev stated that the conference was dedicated to initiating a new scientific perspective on the events of 28 April. Philosopher and academician Afrand Dashdamirov noted:

The dates of April 28 and May 28 symbolize the confrontation of opposing political systems and values, as well as the political struggle between the rival powers of that era, in the historical memory of the people. However, for the modern Azerbaijani nation, these dates hold a different meaning – they represent stages of a unified historical process associated with the restoration, development, and strengthening of Azerbaijani national statehood and the consolidation and advancement of the Azerbaijani nation.

Historian Jamil Guliyev, in his presentation, regarded the events of 28 May 1918, and 28 April 1920, as parts of a single process, noting that the Azerbaijan Democratic Republic paved the way for the establishment of the Azerbaijan Soviet Socialist Republic. Another historian, academician Alisohbat Sumbatzade, emphasized in his speech that the sovereignty and statehood ideas realized during the ADR period were strengthened and developed during the Soviet era. Therefore, according to him, both 28 May and 28 April occupy an honorable place in the history of the Azerbaijani people.

The Constitutional Act on the Restoration of the State Independence of the Republic of Azerbaijan, adopted on 18 October 1991, characterizes the events of April 1920 as an "occupation":

On April 27–28, 1920, the RSFSR grossly violated international legal norms by deploying its armed forces into Azerbaijan, occupying the territory of the sovereign Republic of Azerbaijan, forcibly overthrowing its legitimately elected authorities, and ending the independence of the Azerbaijani people, achieved at great cost.

However, the decree signed by President Ilham Aliyev on 15 February 2008, titled "On the 90th Anniversary of the Azerbaijan Democratic Republic," presents a contradictory interpretation. While the term "April occupation" is used in the document, it also states that "on April 28, 1920, the second republic – the Azerbaijan Soviet Socialist Republic – was established. The republic, which was able to maintain its independence for two years, retained only formal attributes of independence after becoming part of the USSR in 1922." According to the text of the decree, the current Azerbaijani state is referred to as the fourth republic (implying that the Soviet Azerbaijan period from 1922 to 1991 is considered the third republic).

== Legacy ==
=== In toponymy ===
In honor of the establishment of Soviet power in Azerbaijan, one of the streets in Baku was named "28 April." A station in the Baku Metro also bore the same name.

=== In culture ===
The artist Fyodor Modorov created the paintings "Freedom in Baku in 1920" (1928) and "The Reception of the 'III International' Armored Train in Baku by the City's Workers in 1920" (1933), depicting the Red Army's arrival and its celebratory reception by Baku's labor force.

In 1980, a monument dedicated to the XI Red Army was erected at the entrance to Baku from Sumgait (architect: A. Surkin, sculptor: Tokay Mammadov).

The novel Ali and Nino concludes with the Russian invasion and the occupation of Baku in 1920.

=== In cinematography ===
The earliest films about the April occupation include "Arrival of XI Red Army Units in Baku", "Parade of XI Red Army Units in Baku"(both from 1920), and "First Plenary Session of the XI Convocation of the Baku Soviet" (1931).

Films in Baku dedicated to the April coup include director Ajdar Ibrahimov's "The Stars Do Not Fade" and "Await the Signal from the Sea".

The struggle of Azerbaijani peasants against landowners and Musavatists in 1919 is portrayed in the films "The Peasants" by director Samad Mardanov and "Gatir Mammad" (1974) by Rasim Ojagov. The establishment of Soviet power in Mugan and Lankaran is depicted in director Shamil Mahmudbayov's film "In Flames".

In the seventh season of the Game of Thrones series, one episode contains references to the historical events in Azerbaijan in 1920. In these scenes, the Dothraki, aided by Daenerys Targaryen's dragons, crush the Lannister army. In an interview with The Independent, British costume designer Michele Clapton revealed that this battle was inspired by the Red Army's invasion of Azerbaijan. Clapton explained: "This is the scene where the Dothraki roam the battlefield after crushing the Lannisters. For the first time, they strip the defeated of their outerwear. I was inspired by the historical accounts of Russian forces during the invasion of Azerbaijan, where combatants stripped clothing from the fallen. By the end of the war, it was impossible to distinguish the Bolsheviks from the Democrats, as they had exchanged so many garments with one another."

== See also ==
- List of states and regions involved in the Russian Civil War
- Bibliography of the Russian Revolution and Civil War
- Outline of the Russian Revolution and Civil War
- Red Army invasion of Georgia
- Red Army invasion of Armenia

== Bibliography ==
- History of Azerbaijan (PDF). Administrative Department of the President of the Republic of Azerbaijan, Presidential Library. Archived from the original (PDF) on 16 June 2016.
- Kazemzadeh, Firuz (1950). The Struggle for Transcaucasia (1917-1921). Anglo-Caspian Press Ltd. p. 360. ISBN 978-0-9560004-0-8.
- Shirokorad, Aleksandr B. (2006). Великая речная война, 1918–1920 годы. Вече. p. 416. ISBN 5-9533-1465-5.
- Кадишев, А. Б. (1960), Интервенция и гражданская война в Закавказье, Moskva: Воениздат
- Гафаров, Васиф (2010), Русско-турецкое сближение и независимость Азербайджана (1919–1921), Журнал «Кавказ & Глобализация» (PDF). 4, Выпуск 1—2. CA&CC Pres
- Документы внешней политики СССР (1958), Документы внешней политики СССР. Т. II. 1 января 1919 г.-30 июня 1920 г., Изд-во политической литературы
- Hovannisian, Richard G. (1997), "The Republic of Armenia. Vol. III. From London to Sèvres to London, February-August 1920", Central Asian Survey
- БСЭ, Большая Советская Энциклопедия (2011), Бакинская операция 1920, Moscow, archived from the original on 16 October 2011
- Гражданская война и военная интервенция в СССР: Энциклопедия (1987), Бакинская операция 1920, Moscow: Советская энциклопедия. 2-е изд.
- Гражданская война и военная интервенция в СССР. Энциклопедия (1983), Гражданская война и интервенция в СССР (энциклопедия) | Проект «Исторические Материалы», Moscow: Советская энциклопедия
- Большая российская энциклопедия, Большая российская энциклопедия - электронная версия (2005), БАКИ́НСКАЯ ОПЕРА́ЦИЯ 1920, Moscow: Т. 2.
- Азербайджанская советская энциклопедия, Под ред. Дж. Кулиева (1976), 28 апреля, Baku: Главная редакция Азербайджанской советской энциклопедии — Т. 1
- Павлович, Дмитрий Павлович (2008), Революция и Гражданская война в России: 1917 — 1923 гг.: Энциклопедия, Moscow: ТЕРРА. В 4 томах. — Т. 1, ISBN 978-5-273-00561-7
- Quliyev, Cəmil (2004), Tarix: düşüncələr, mülahizələr, qeydlər... (1953-2003), Bakı: Elm
- Ратгаузер, Я. (1928), Борьба за советский Азербайджан. К истории Апрельского переворота, Баку
- Баберовски, Й. (2010), Враг есть везде. Сталинизм на Кавказе, Moscow: Российская политическая энциклопедия (РОССПЭН), Фонд «Президентский центр Б.Н. Ельцина», ISBN 978-5-8243-1435-9
- Азербайджанская Демократическая Республика (1918-1920). Парламнет. (Стенографические отчёты) (1998), Азербайджанская Демократическая Республика (1918-1920). Парламнет. (Стенографические отчёты) (PDF), Баку: Изд-во «Азербайджан»
- Гёзалов, П. Ф. (2016), Установление советской власти в Азербайджане // Материалы международной научно-практической конференции «История Гражданской войны в России 1917 — 1922 гг.», Moscow: ЦМВС РФ
- Əmrahov, Mais (2022), "Aprel İşğalından Sonra Sovet Bolşevik Rejiminin Azərbaycan Xalqının Milli-Mənəvi Dəyərlərinə Qarşı Soyqırımı Siyasəti", Akademik Tarih ve Düşünce Dergisi, 9 (3), Akademik Tarih ve Düşünce Dergisi, 9 Sayı: 3: 748–776
- Токаржевский, Е. А. (1957), Из истории иностранной интервенции и гражданской войны в Азербайджане, Баку: Изд-во АН Азербайджанской ССР
- Багирова, И. С. (1997), Политические партии и организации Азербайджана в начале XX века, Баку: Элм
- Агамалиева, Отв. ред. Н. Агамалиева (1998), Азербайджанская Демократическая Республика (1918-1920) (PDF), Баку: Элм, ISBN 5-8066-0897-2
- История Коммунистической партии Азербайджана (1958), История Коммунистической партии Азербайджана Ч. 1- / Ин-т истории партии при ЦК КП Азербайджана - филиал Ин-та марксизма-ленинизма при ЦК КПСС, Баку: Азербайджанское гос. изд-во, Ч. 1.
- Сумбатзаде, А. С. (1972), Социально-экономические предпосылки победы Советской власти в Азербайджане, Moscow: Наука
- История Азербайджана. Т. 3. Ч. 1. (1958), История Азербайджана [Текст] : В 3 т.. С древнейших времен до присоединения Азербайджана к России / 4 т., Изд-во АН Азербайджанской ССР
- Partii̐a Tarikhi Institutu (1963), Очерки истории Коммунистической партии Азербайджана, Азербайджанское гос. изд-во
- Гусейнов, А. А. (1962), Из истории издания и распространения программы партии большевиками Азербайджана (1903-1920 гг.), Баку: Вопросы истории Компартии Азербайджана. Вып. 26.
- Искендеров, М. (1970), С. М. Киров в Азербайджане, Баку: Азербайджанское гос. изд-во
- Катибли, М. (1964), Чингиз Ильдрым (биографический очерк), Баку: Азербайджанское гос. изд-во
- Багиров, М. (1965), Музаффар Нариманов (биографический очерк), Баку: Азербайджанское гос. изд-во
- Расулбеков, И. (1963), Али Байрамов (биографический очерк), Баку: Азербайджанское гос. изд-во
- Халилов, А. (2016), Внутренние противоречия и борьба в руководстве Азербайджанской ЧК в 1920-1922 гг, Вопросы истории — № 5.
- История Азербайджана (1963), История Азербайджана: ч. 1. Азербайджан в период пролетарской революции и построения социализма. ч. 2. Азербайджан в годы завершения строительства социалистического общества и в период пазвернытого строительства коммунизма, Баку: Изд-во АН Азербайджанской ССР. Т. 3, часть 1
- Касумов З.М., Редкол.: З.М. (1973), История государства и права Азербайджанской ССР (1920—1934 гг.), Баку: Элм
- Дарабади, П. (2013), Военно-политическая история Азербайджана (1917-1920 годы), Баку: Изд.дом «Кавказ»
- Каренин, А. (1963), Султан Меджид Эфендиев (биографический очерк), Баку: Азербайджанское гос. изд-во
- История государства и права Азербайджанской ССР (1920 — 1934 гг.) (1973), Баку: Элм
- Мамедова, Ш. (2012), Антисоветские выступления в Азербайджане в 1920 — 1930-е годы, Вопросы истории — № 3.
- Дубнер, А. (1931), Бакинский пролетариат в годы революции (1917—1920), Баку: Изд-во АзГНИИ
- Саркисян, Е. К. (1962), Экспансионистская политика Османской империи в Закавказье накануне и в годы Первой Мировой войны, Изд-во Академии наук Армянской ССР
- Каземзаде, Ф. (2010), Борьба за Закавказье (1917-1921) (PDF), Стокгольм: CA&CC Press, archived from the original (PDF) on 5 July 2022
- Минц, И. И. (1971), Победа советской власти в Закавказье, Мецниереба
- Морозова, О. М. (2015), Муганская область в 1918—1919 гг, Русская старина. Vol. (13), Is. 1.
- Критика фальсификаций национальных отношений в СССР (1984), [elib_title_lib_document] – Научная библиотека, Moskva: Политиздат
- Гулиев, Дж. (1967), Против буржуазной фальсификации истории (к характеристике сущности мусаватского правительства), Труды Института истории партии ЦК КП Азербайджана
- Азовцева, под общей ред. Н.Н. (1986), Гражданская война в СССР, Moskva: Воениздат
- Ибрагимов, С. (1975), Генерал Али Ага Шихлинский, Баку: Азербайджанское гос. изд-во
- Караев, А. Г. (1926), Из недавнего прошлого (материалы к истории Азербайджанской коммунистической партии (б), Баку
- Искендеров, М. С. (1958), Из истории борьбы Коммунистической партии Азербайджана за победу Советской власти, Баку: Азербайджанское гос. издат.
- Советский Азербайджан: мифы и действительность (1987), Советский Азербайджан: мифы и действительность, Баку: Элм
- Guseinov, I. A. (1967), Борьба за победу Советской власти в Азербайджане 1918-1920. Документы и материалы, Баку: Изд-во АН Азербайджанской ССР
- Байрамов, К. М. (1983), Массовые рабочие организации Азербайджана в борьбе за победу Советской власти 1918—1920 гг., Баку: Элм
- К истории установления Советской власти в Азербайджане (1952), Труды Института истории партии при ЦК ВКП(б) Азербайджана — Т. 18., Баку
- Swietochowski, Tadeusz (1978), The Himmat party. Socialism and the national question in Russian Azerbaijan 1904- 1920, Cahiers du monde russe et soviétique. Vol. 19, № 1-2.— Janvier-Juin 1978
- Группа авторов (1960), История гражданской войны в СССР, Moskva: Государственное издательство политической литературы — Т. 5.
- Гусейнов, И. (1952), Победа Советской власти в Азербайджане в 1920 году и помощь XI Красной Армии, Баку: Труды Института истории партии при ЦК ВКП(б) Азербайджана — Т. XVIII.
- Интернациональная помощь XI армии в борьбе за победу Советской власти в Азербайджане (1989), Интернациональная помощь XI армии в борьбе за победу Советской власти в Азербайджане. Документы и материалы 1920-1921 гг., Баку: Азербайджанское гос. изд-во
- Муханов, В. М. (2018), Грузинская Демократическая Республика: от первых дней независимости до советизации, Moskva: МГИМО-Университет
- Marshall, Alex (2010), The Caucasus Under Soviet Rule., Routledge, ISBN 9780415410120
- Эмиров, Н. П. (1972), Из истории военной интервенции и гражданской войны в Дагестане, Махачкала: Дагестанское книжное изд-во
- Армия. (Документы и материалы) (1998), Азербайджанская Демократическая Республика (1918―1920). Армия. (Документы и материалы) (PDF), Баку: Азербайджан
- Croissant, Michael P. (1998), The Armenia-Azerbaijan Conflict: Causes and Implications, Greenwood Publishing Group, ISBN 0-2759-6241-5
- Сухоруков, В. Т. (1961), XI Армия в боях на Северном Кавказе и Нижней Волге в 1918—1920 гг., Moskva
- Нариманов, Н. (1990), К истории нашей революции на окраинах (Письмо И. В. Сталину), Баку
- Фатали Хан Хойский. Жизнь и деятельность (Документы и материалы) (1998), Фатали Хан Хойский. Жизнь и деятельность (документы и материалы), Баку: Изд-во «Азербайджан»
- Зейналова С. А., С. А. (1968), Участие посланцев Советской России в установлении Советской власти в Азербайджане (По материалам личного архива командира отряда бронепоездов XI Армии М. Г. Ефремова) // Материалы по истории Азербайджан — Т. VII., Баку: Изд-во АН Азербайджанской ССР
- Шаламова, Шаламова Л., Зейналова С. (1977), Боевые крылья республики // Великий Октябрь и Советский Азербайджан (Экспонаты рассказывают), Баку: Элм
- Познахирёв, В. В. (2014), Турецкие воинские формирования Красной Армии в 1918 — 1920 гг, Вопросы истории — № 7.
- Квинитадзе, Г. И. (1985), Мои воспоминания в годы независимости Грузии 1917 — 1921 / Под общей ред. Н. Н. Азовцева, Paris: YMCA-PRESS
- Алый стяг над Закавказьем (1980), Алый стяг над Закавказьем. Воспоминания ветеранов партии, Баку: Азербайджанское гос. изд-во
- Мусабеков, Газанфар (1960), Избранные статьи и речи — Т. 1., Баку: Изд-во АН Азербайджанской ССР
- Группа авторов (1981), Краснознамённый Закавказский: Очерки истории Краснознамённого Закавказского военного округа, Тбилиси: Сабчота Сакартвело
- Друганов, П. А. (1978), Рейд группы бронепоездов // От Зимнего до Перекопа, Moskva: Воениздат
- Гасанлы, Дж. П. (2010), История дипломатии Азербайджанской Республики: Внешняя политика Азербайджанской Демократической Республики (1918—1920) — Т. I., Флинта: Наука, ISBN 978-5-9765-0900-9
- Махарадзе, Н. Б. (1965), Победа социалистической революции в Грузии, Тбилиси: «Сабчота Сакартвело»
- краткий статистический сборник (1969), Нагорный Карабах за годы Советской власти (краткий статистический сборник), Степанакерт
- Гусейнов, А. А. (1976), Алигейдар Караев (биографический очерк), Баку: Азербайджанское гос. изд-во
- Безугольный, А. Ю. (2007), Народы Кавказа и Красная армия. 1918—1945 годы, Moskva: Вече
- Гросул, В. Я. (2007), Образование СССР (1917-1924 гг.), Moskva: Изд. ИТРК
- Алиев, С. М. (2004), История Ирана. XX век (PDF), Moskva: ИВ РАН: Крафт+
- Гулиев, Дж. Б. (1972), Под знаменем ленинской национальной политики (Осуществлением Коммунистической партией ленинской национальной политики в Азербайджане в 1920-1925 гг.), Баку: Азербайджанское гос. изд-во
- Манусевич, А. Я. (1971), Интернационалисты трудящиеся зарубежных стран-участники борьбы за власть советов, Moskva: Наука — Т. 2
- Гасанлы, Дж. П. (2013), История дипломатии азербайджанской Республики: в 3 т. т. II: Внешняя политика Азербайджана в годы советской власти (1920–1939) (PDF), Moskva: ФЛИНТА: Наука
- Эфендиев, С. М. (1957), Из истории революционного движения азербайджанского пролетариата, Баку: Азербайджанское гос. изд-во
- Исмаилов, Э. Э. (2005), Георгиевские кавалеры — азербайджанцы, Moskva: Герои отечества
- Персидский фронт мировой революции. Документы о советском вторжении в Гилян (1920 — 1921) (2009), Персидский фронт мировой революции: документы о советском вторжении в Гилян, 1920-1921, Moskva: Квадрига, ISBN 978-5-904162-08-5
- Персиц, М. А. (1996), Застенчивая интервенция. О советском вторжении в Иран. 1920—1921 гг, Moskva, archived from the original on 23 November 2018
- Светоховский, Тадеуш (2001), Русское правление, модернизаторские элиты и становление национальной идентичности в Азербайджане // Азербайджан и Россия: общества и государства / Отв. ред. и сост. Д. Е. Фурман, Moskva: Летний сад, ISBN 5-94381-025-0, archived from the original on 1 April 2020
- Степанов, Алексей (2008), Азербайджанская Красная армия. 1920-1924, Moskva: Журнал «Старый Цейхгауз» — № 1 (25)
- Токаржевский, Е. А. (1948), Большевики Азербайджана в борьбе за упрочение Советской власти в 1920 году, Баку: Труды Азербайджанского филиала ИМЭЛ при ЦК ВКП(б) — Т. XI
- Шабанов, Ф. Ш. (1959), Развитие Советской государственности в Азербайджане, Moskva: Государственное издательство юридической литературы
- Swietochowski, Tadeusz (2004), Russian Azerbaijan, 1905—1920. The Shaping of National Identity in a Muslim Community, Cambridge: Cambridge University Press, ISBN 978-0-521-52245-8
- Husejnof, T. (1926), Aprel İnkı̡labı̡ (Azərbajcanda Зyra hɵqumətinin altı̡ illijinə), Baqı̡
- Bakı Fəhləsi (1926), Azərbajcanda Aprel inkilabı̡ (1920-ci il Aprelinin 28-i), „Baqı̡ Fəhləsi" Kooperatif Nəзrijjatı̡
- Гусейнов, Т. (1926), Апрельская революция. К шестой годовщине установления Советской власти в Азербайджане, Баку
- Smith, Michael G. (2001), Anatomy of a Rumour: Murder Scandal, the Musavat Party and Narratives of the Russian Revolution in Baku, 1917-20, Journal of Contemporary History. Vol.36, No.2.
- Широкорад, А. Б., Великая речная война. 1918–1920 годы, Moskva: Вече
- Смит, М. (2001), Память об утратах и азербайджанское общество, Moskva: Азербайджан и Россия: общества и государства / Отв. ред. и сост. Д. Е. Фурман. Летний сад, ISBN 5-94381-025-0, archived from the original on 1 April 2020
- Бакинский рабочий (1991), 28 апреля 1920 года — историческая веха в летописи Азербайджана, — № 82 (22107)
- Mahmudov, Yaqub (2008), Азербайджанская Демократическая Республика. Архивные документы Великобритании, Баку
- Эфендизаде, Р. М. (1986), Архитектура Советского Азербайджана, Стройиздат
- Kazımzadə, Aydın (2004), Bizim "Azərbaycanfilm" - Azərbaycan Respublikası Mədəniyyət Nazirliyi. C.Cabbarlı adına "Azərbaycanfilm" kinostudiyası. 1923-2003-cü illər, Bakı: Mütərcim
- Azərbaycan Respublikası Mədəniyyət və Turizm Nazirliyi (2011), "2011-ci ilin yubilyar filmləri", Bakı: Dövlət Film Fondu. Kino-Bülleten. IV buraxılış: Apostroff
- Kazımzadə, Aydın (2010), Uzunömürlü "Kəndlilər": [Rejissor Səməd Mərdanovun quruluşunda hazırlanan eyni adlı kino haqqında], Mədəniyyət
- Altstadt, Audrey L. (1992), The Azerbaijani Turks: Power and Identity under Russian Rule, Stanford, California: Hoover Institution Press, ISBN 0817991824
- Cornell, Svante E. (2011), Azerbaijan Since Independence, United States of America: M.E: Sharpe, ISBN 978-0-7656-3002-5
- Isgenderli, Anar (2011), Realities of Azerbaijan, 1917-1920, United States of America: Xlibris Corporation, ISBN 9781456879549
- Leeuw, Charles van der (2000), Azerbaijan: A Quest for Identity, Richmond, England: Palgrave Macmillan, ISBN 9780700711178
- Swietochowski, Tadeusz (1995), Russia-Azerbaijan: A Borderline of Transition, United States of America: Columbia University Press, ISBN 0231070683
- Quliyev, Cəmil (2008), Azərbaycan tarixi. Yeddi cilddə. VI Cild (PDF), Baku: Elm nəşriyyatı, archived from the original (PDF) on 19 February 2018
- Nəzərli, Əzizə (2014), XI Красная армия в Северном Азербайджане: оккупация, расправы, бесчинства / XI Qırmızı Ordu Şimali Azərbaycanda: işğal, zorakılıq, özbaşınalıq, Baku: Elm və təhsil nəşriyyatı
- Мустафа-заде, Рахман (2006), Две Республики: азербайджано-российские отношения в 1918–1922 гг (PDF), МИК, ISBN 5-87902-097-5
- Əhmədova, Firdovsiyyə (1998), Nəriman Nərimanov – ideal və gerçəklik, Baku: Elm və həyat
- Nərimanov, Nəriman (1992), Ucqarlarda inqilabımızın tarixinə dair (PDF), Baku: Azərnəşr, archived from the original (PDF) on 18 November 2021
- Rəhmanzadə, Şamil (2008), Azərbaycan-Gürcüstan münasibətlərində ərazi məsələləri: Azərbaycanın şimal-qərb bölgəsinin materialları əsasında: 1917-1930-cu illərin əvvəlləri, Baku: Aspoliqraf
- Ataxan Paşayev, Ataxan (1988), Декреты Азревкома, 1920–1921 гг: сборник документов / Azərbaycan İnqilab Komitəsinin dekretləri 1920-1921-ci illər: sənədlər toplusu, Baku: Azərnəşr, ISBN 9785552000142
- Yaqublu, Nəsiman (2012), Müsavat partiyasının tarixi (PDF), Baku: Adiloğlu nəşriyyatı
- Rəsulzadə, Məhəmməd Əmin (1990), Azərbaycan Cümhuriyyəti (PDF), Baku: Elm nəşriyyatı
- Рафиев, Б.Дж. (2008), Если снять гриф секретности очерки новейшей истории Азербайджана, Глазовская типография
- Емельянов, Василий (1979), На заре новой жизни, Baku: Azərnəşr
- Микоян, Анастас Иванович (1975), В начале двадцатых, Издательство политической литературы
- Нариманов, Н.Н. (1989), Избранные произведения: в трёх томах. II,1918-1921, Baku: Azərnəşr
- З. И., Ибрагимов; Т. М., Исламов (1971), Интернационалисты в борьбе за власть Советов в Закавказье // Интернационалисты трудящиеся зарубежных стран-участники борьбы за власть советов. Т. 2, часть 2, Наука
- М., Волхонский; В., Муханов (2007), По следам Азербайджанской Демократической Республики, Европа, ISBN 978-5-9739-0114-1
- Н., Агамалиева; Р., Худиев (1994), Азербайджанская Республика. Страницы политической истории 1918-1920 г.г., Баку: Сабах
- П. А, Азизбекова; А. Н., Мнацаканян; М. Б., Траскунов (1969), Советская Россия и борьба за установление и упрочение власти Советов в Закавказье, Азернешр
- А. С., Амирханова-Кулиш; З. Г., Зульпукаров (1981), Помощь Красной Армии в социалистическом строительстве в Азербайджане, Наука
