= Ali bey Ashurbeyov =

Azerbaijani businessman and philanthropist

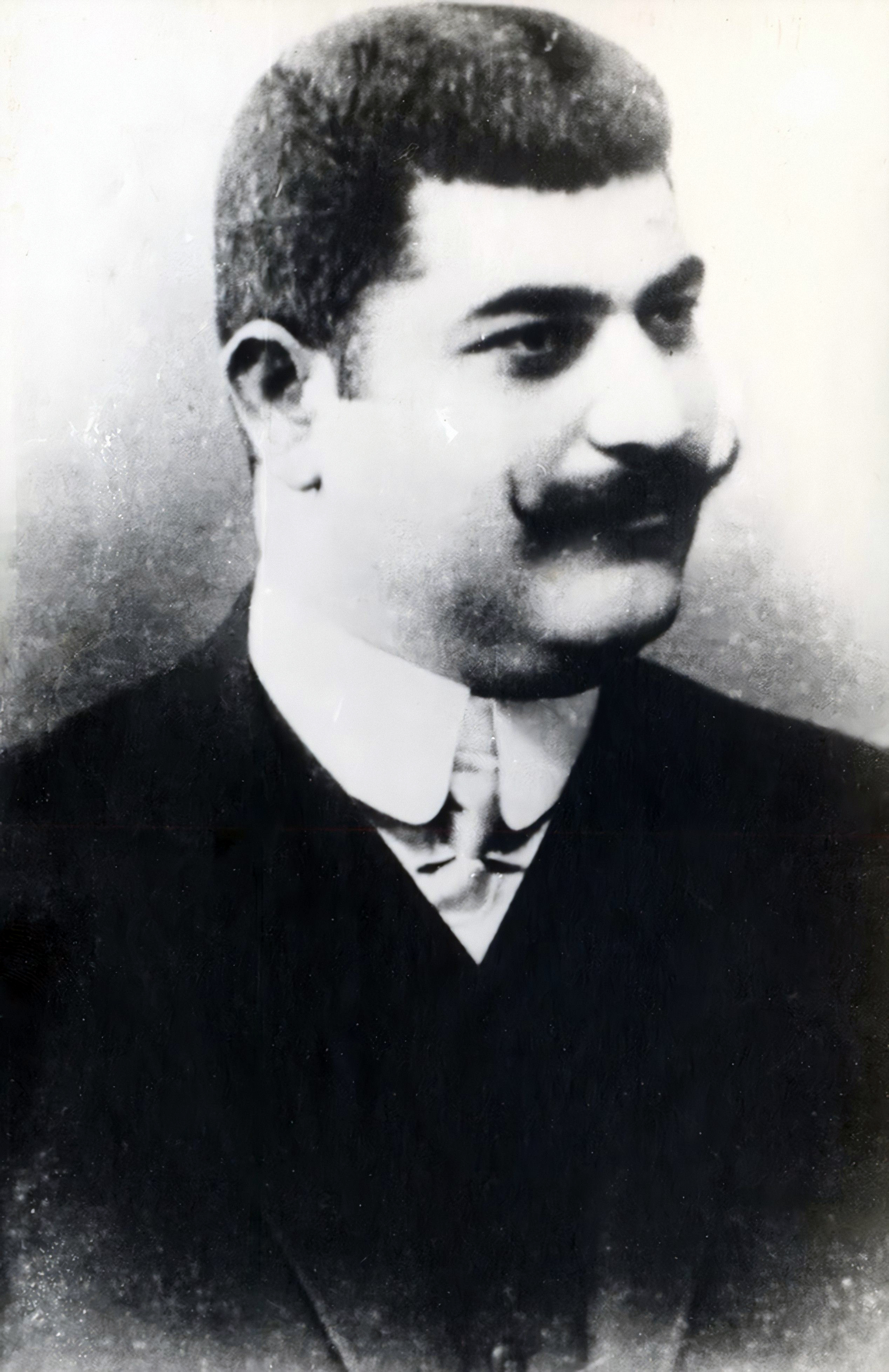
- Born: 1878; Baku, Russian Empire
- Died: 1940 (aged 61–62); Baku, Soviet Azerbaijan, Soviet Union
- Parent: Teymur bey Ashurbeyov

Ali Bey Teymur Bey oghlu Ashurbeyov (1878, Baku, Russian Empire – 1940, Baku, Soviet Azerbaijan, Soviet Union) was a prominent member of the Ashurbeyov family, a well-known Azerbaijani philanthropist and millionaire. He is notably remembered for commissioning the construction of the Juma Mosque at his own expense.

== Early life and family ==
Ali Bey was the son of Teymur bey Qara bey oghlu Ashurbeyov (1834–1908), who was the grandson of Haji Imamverdi Bey, the son of Ashur Khan, the founder of the Ashurbeyov lineage. His mother, Tutu Khanum (1846 – early 1930s), was from Zabrat and the daughter of Mashadi Alasgar Haji Jafar oghlu. Ali Bey's brother, Bala Bey, was the father of the renowned Azerbaijani scholar Sara Ashurbeyli.

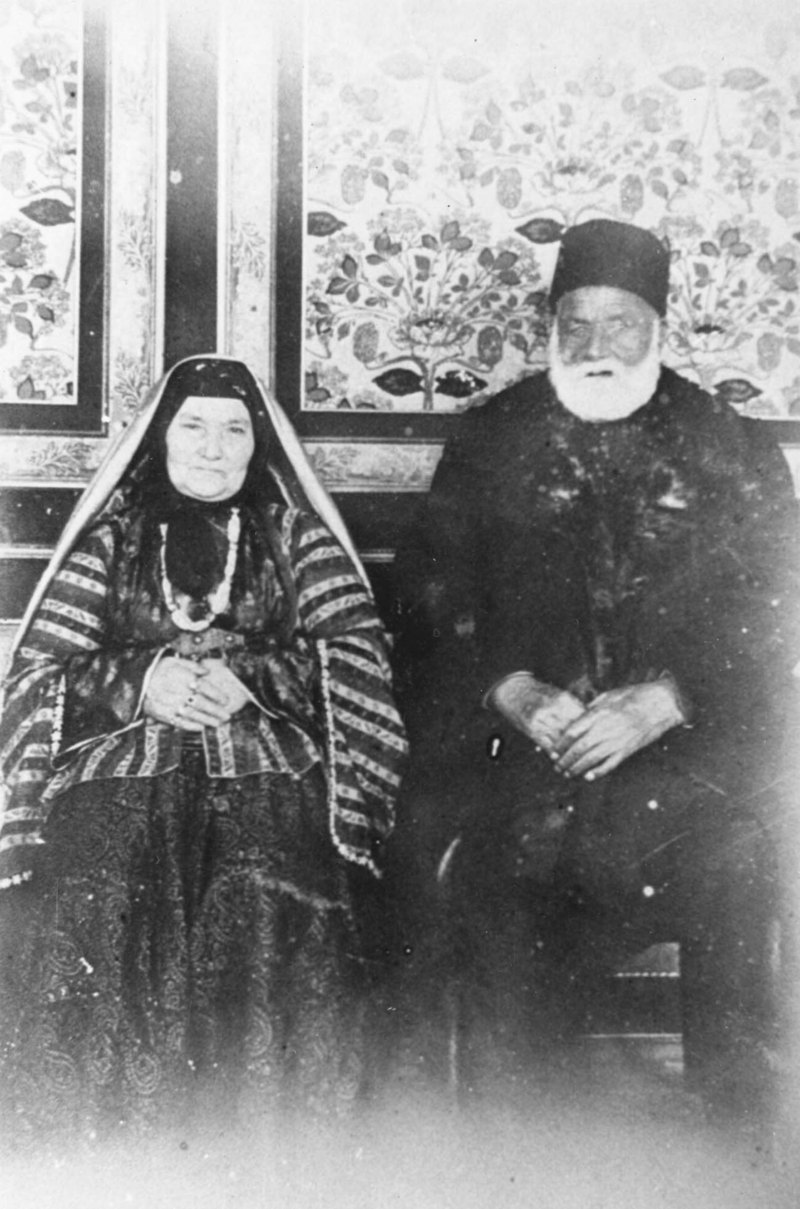
Teymur bey Ashurbeyli and Tutu Khanum Ashurbeyli

== Economic activity ==
Teymur Bey had become a millionaire through the exploitation of oil deposits on inherited lands. He established the "Ashurbeyov and Brothers" company, which grew into one of Baku's most profitable enterprises. Unlike many others, Teymur Bey did not lease his lands but instead developed the oil extraction business himself. After his death, his sons continued the enterprise. Ali Bey and his brother Bala Bey emerged as influential arbitrators in the frequent disputes resulting from the fierce competition over oil resources. They founded the "Ali Bey and Bala Bey Ashurbeyov Brothers" company, which became one of the most advanced oil enterprises in Baku. Their oil fields were located near the villages of Sabunchu and Zabrat. Notably, a mining engineer named Lann, who managed the Ashurbeyov oil fields for several years, later became the Minister of Mining Industry in Estonia.

== During the March Massacres ==
At the time of the March Massacres of 1918, Ali Bey was abroad. As the violence erupted, the Ashurbeyov family vacated their mansion and relocated to the village of Sabunchu. Their property was saved from looting largely due to the intervention of Mademoiselle Grelo, the French governess of Bala Bey's daughters. In her memoirs, Sara Ashurbeyli recounts that Grelo hung a French flag on the mansion's entrance and presented herself as a French aristocrat, thereby protecting much of the building from Dashnak and Bolshevik forces. Nevertheless, the attackers entered the rear section of the mansion, where Ali Bey had resided, looting and setting fire to his portion of the house.

== After the Bolshevik occupation ==
Following the Bolshevik occupation of Azerbaijan in April 1920, the nationalization of the oil industry began. Along with the confiscation of family properties and companies, Ali Bey himself was arrested and detained in the infamous Lubyanka prison in Moscow. He was later released due to the intercession of Nariman Narimanov, a distant relative of Bala Bey's wife, Ismat Khanum. Shortly afterward, Bala Bey and his family were forced to emigrate to Turkey. Although he returned to Baku during the New Economic Policy (NEP) period, he was arrested in 1935 and executed in exile in Kazakhstan in 1937. Deeply affected by his brother's fate, Ali Bey died of a heart attack in 1940.

== See also ==
- Ashurbeyov
