= Ashurbeyli =

Ashurbeyli (Azerbaijani: Aşurbəyli; Russian: Ашурбейли) is a gender-neutral Azerbaijani surname that may refer to

- Igor Ashurbeyli (born 1963), Russian scientist and businessman
- Sara Ashurbeyli (1906–2001), Azerbaijani historian, orientalist and scholar

== See also ==
- Ashurbeyov
