= Nabat Ashurbeyova =

Azerbaijani woman philanthropist (1795–1912)

- Born: 1795; Baku, Azerbaijan
- Died: 7 December 1912 (aged 116–117); Baku
- Spouse: Haji Musa Rza Rzayev
- Children: Haji Abbasgulu Rzayev, Zuleykha and Gulbeste

Nabat Goja Ashurbeyova (Azerbaijani: Nabat Aşurbəyova Qoca qızı; 1795, Baku- 1912, Baku) was a Azerbaijani woman philanthropist.

== Life ==
Nabat khanim Gojabey gizi, granddaughter of Haji Imamverdi bey Ashur khan and one of the richest women in Azerbaijan in the 19th century, was born in 1795 in Baku. Oil fields and apartment houses were the source of great wealth that she possessed. After she married Haji Musa Rza Rzayev, a wealthy merchant, Nabat Khanim became known as a philanthropist. They had a son (Haji Abbasgulu Rzayev) and two daughters (Zuleykha and Gulbeste).

== Philanthropic work ==
Prior to construction of the Teze Pir mosque, Nabat khanim joined H.Z. Taghiyev`s initiative and made huge contributions to financing construction of Shollar water pipeline, which is one of the largest water pipeline systems that supplies Baku with drinking water.

Nabat khanim also lent a large amount of money to the construction of the "Seyyid Hospital" in the district of Sabunchu in Baku. Patients were treated in this hospital at her expense for a long time. The bathhouse, which construction was financed by Nabat khanim in Baku was free for the poor once a week.

Her greatest charity was the construction of Taza Pir Mosque. It was built between 1905 and 1914. Presently the Administration of Caucasian Muslims is located in this mosque.

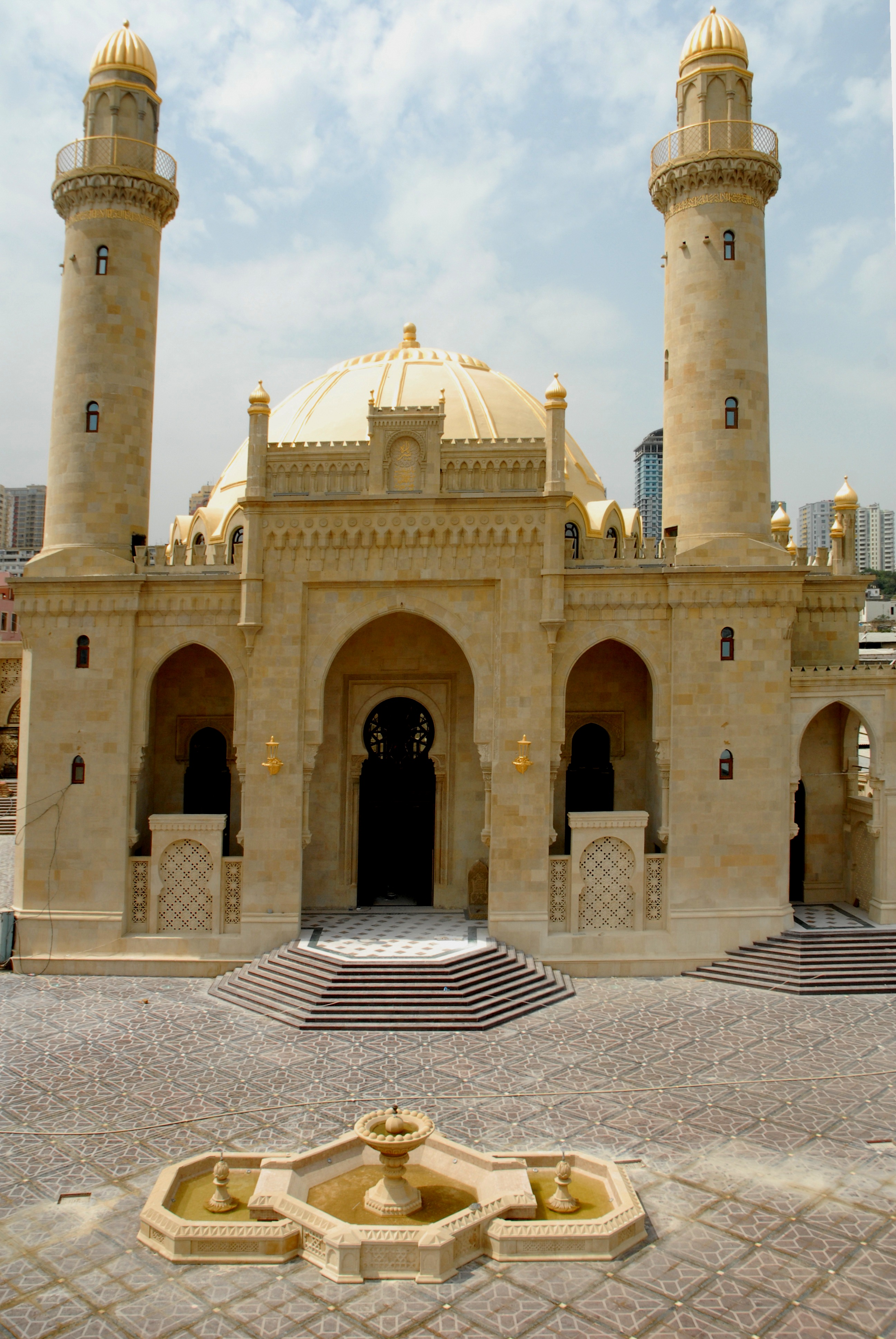
Main façade of the Taza Pir Mosque, Baku, Azerbaijan.

Nabat khanim got the permission of the Government to build a mosque at her expense. She has spent all the profit of the oil wells she owns for the construction of the mosque. She invited Ziver bey Ahmadbayov, the first Azerbaijani architect, the graduate of the St.Petersburg Civil Construction Institute to design the mosque. In the following years, Zivar bey Ahmadbeyov was the first Chief Executive Officer of Baku. Ziver bey Ahmadbeyov was sent to the Eastern countries to learn the design and construction of mosques at the expense of Nabat khanim.

As Ziver bey Ahmadbeyov returned, he presented project of the mosque with two-tier minarets in eastern style. However the mosque`s minarets were built only up to the first tier in accordance with the fatwa of Orthodox clerics.

Nabat khanim invited H.Z.Taghiyev to lay the very first foundation stone of the mosque. When the construction of the mosque was completed, the last stone in the center of the big dome was again entrusted to Haji Zeynalabdin Taghiyev.

Nabat Khanim died on December 7, 1912, aged 117. As a sign of gratitude to Nabat khanim, local residents buried her in the yard of the mosque, on the right side of the main door. After her death her son, Haji Abbasgulu Rzayev was engaged in the construction of the mosque. He also was buried in the yard of the mosque after his death.

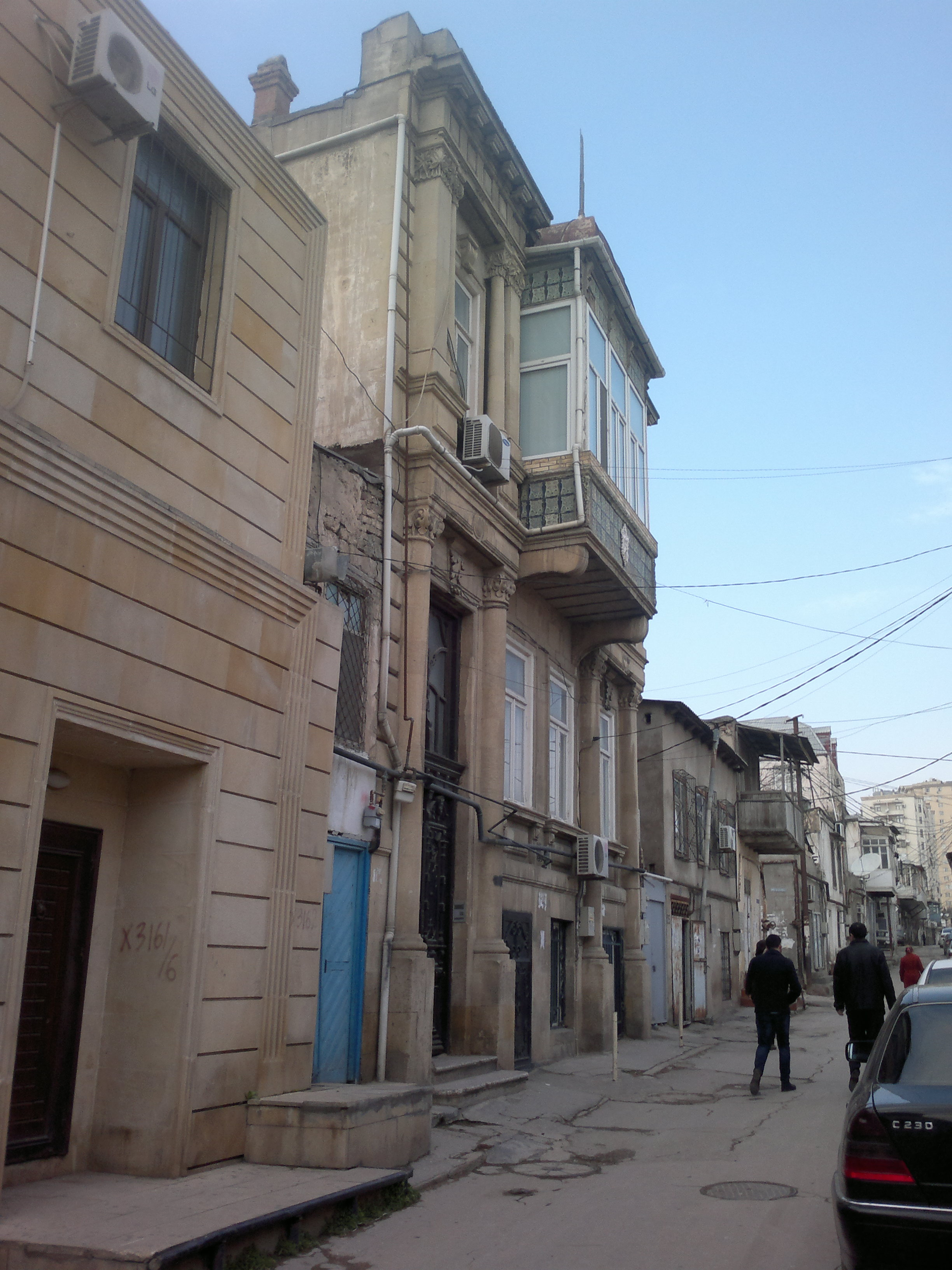
Nabat Ashurbeyova Street

In accordance with the presidential order, a project on reconstruction of the mosque and around territories was prepared in 2005. On July 6, 2009, after the reconstruction and construction work, an opening ceremony was held with the participation of the president of Azerbaijan. The name of Mustafa Subhi Street in Sabail district of Baku has been renamed as Nabat Ashurbeyova.

== See also ==
- Ashurbeyov
- Zeynalabdin Taghiyev
- Shamsi Asadullayev
