= Secondary School Number 67 =

Public School In Azerbaijan

The Secondary School Number 67 is a public secondary school located in Sabunchu district, Baku, Azerbaijan. Having been founded in 1897, the school is the first mixed-type school in Sabunchu district.
