= Ashurbeyov =

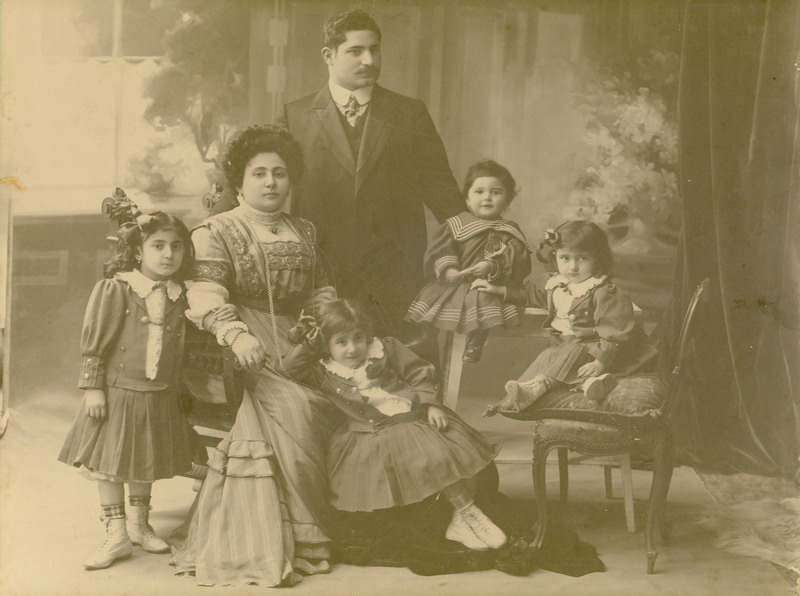
- Bala bey Ashurbeyov with his wife Ismet khanim Ashurbeyovs with their children (from left to right): Sara khanim, Sitara khanim, Reshad bey, Maryam khanim.

Origin
- Region of origin: Baku, Azerbaijan

The Ashurbeyovs (Azerbaijani: Aşurbəyov) or Ashurbeylis (Azerbaijani: Aşurbəyli) are an Azerbaijani noble family, with an extensive history and bloodline.

== History ==
The Ashurbeyov family originated from Ashur khan Afshar. Ashur khan was Nadir shah's relative, and due to this, he became governor of Tabriz, then vicar of Iranian Azerbaijan during the reign of Nadir shah. In 1743, he participated in suppression of Sam Mirza's rebellion, who posed himself as the descendant of the Safavids. Nadir shah presented lands in Absheron peninsula, including Sabunchu, Keshly and Zabrat to Ashur khan according to these merits. A lot of members of Ashur bey's family settled in these possessions.

Ashur khan had five sons: Abdulla bey, Haji Imamverdi bey, Danial bey, Aliyar bey and Allahverdi bey. Ashur bey-elder son of Haji Imamverdi bey possessed Sabunchu and Zabrat villages "on the rights of khan" at the last khan of Baku and at Russian administration. During the Russo-Persian War he supported the dethroned khan of Baku-Huseyngulu Khan, who came to Baku with shakh's army and besieged the city. After suffering defeat in the war the Persian army began to move back to South and Huseyngulu khan followed them and moved to South. The beys supporting the khan came to him and Ashur bey was also among them with his son Ahmed bey and some members of the family. Their property was allocated among his relatives. In 1873, "The Commission of Beys" confirmed the bey origin of this family in the following way: posterity of elder sons of Ashur khan Afshar-Haji Imamverdi bey and Allahverdi bey was recognized in hereditary bey dignity under the surname of the Ashurbeyovs. Further a lot of representatives of this family have Ashurbeyli or Ashurli surname. At the end of the 19th century, large oil fields were discovered in ancestral lands of the Ashurbeyovs, due to which the Ashurbeyovs became one of the richest families of pre-revolutionary Baku.

== Well-known representatives ==
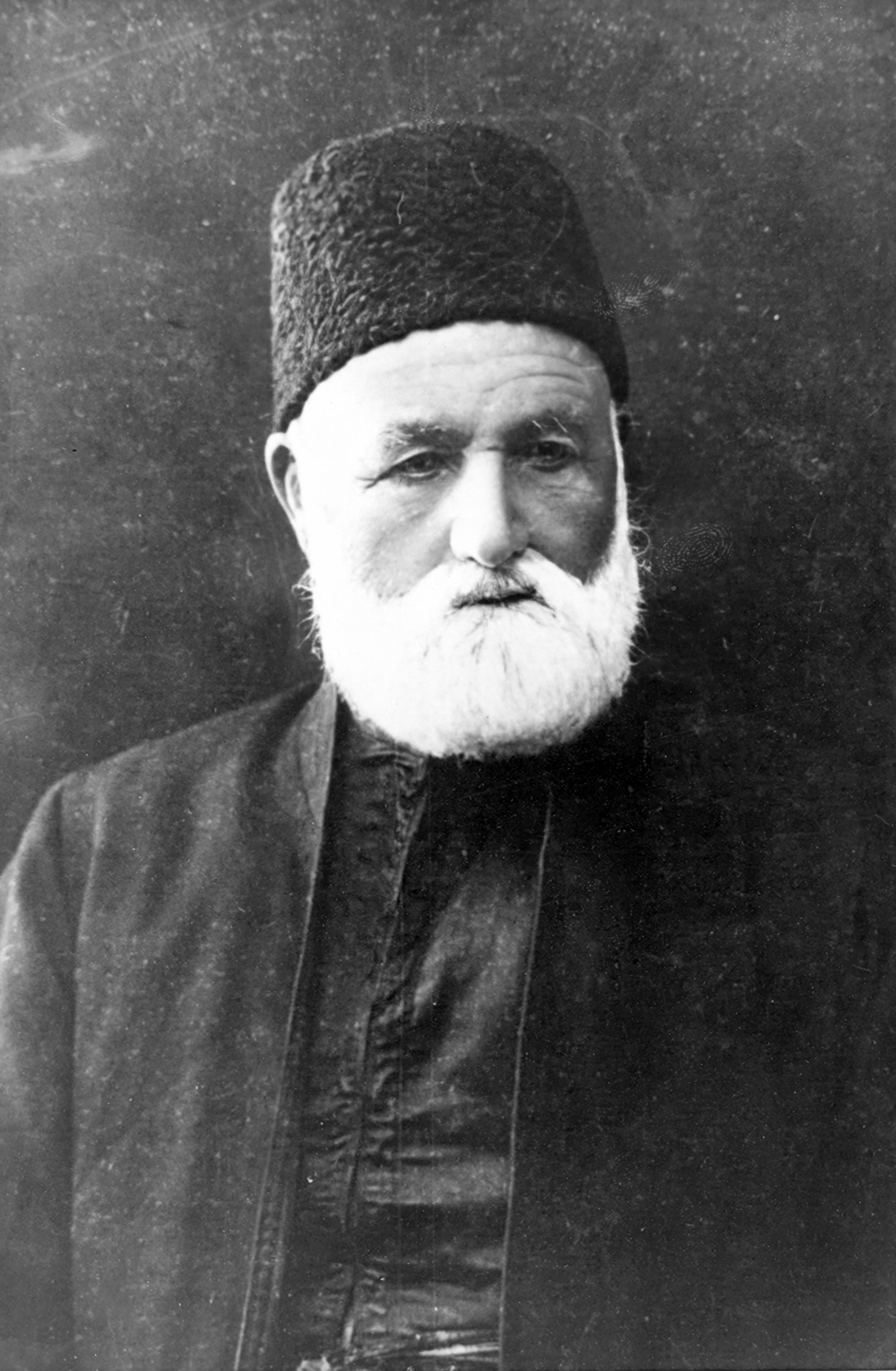
Teymur bey Ashurbeyov

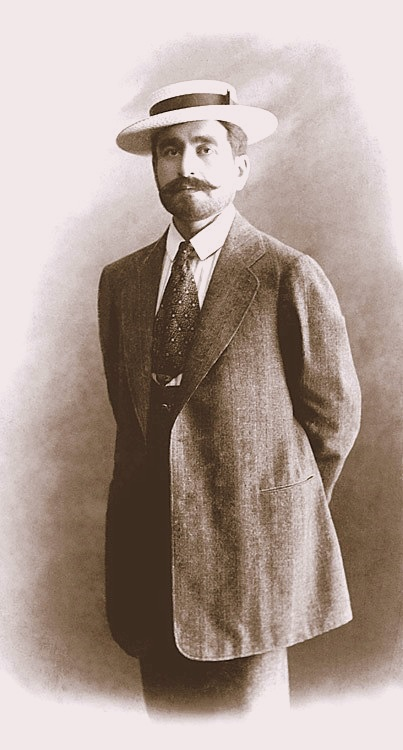
Isa bey Ashurbeyov

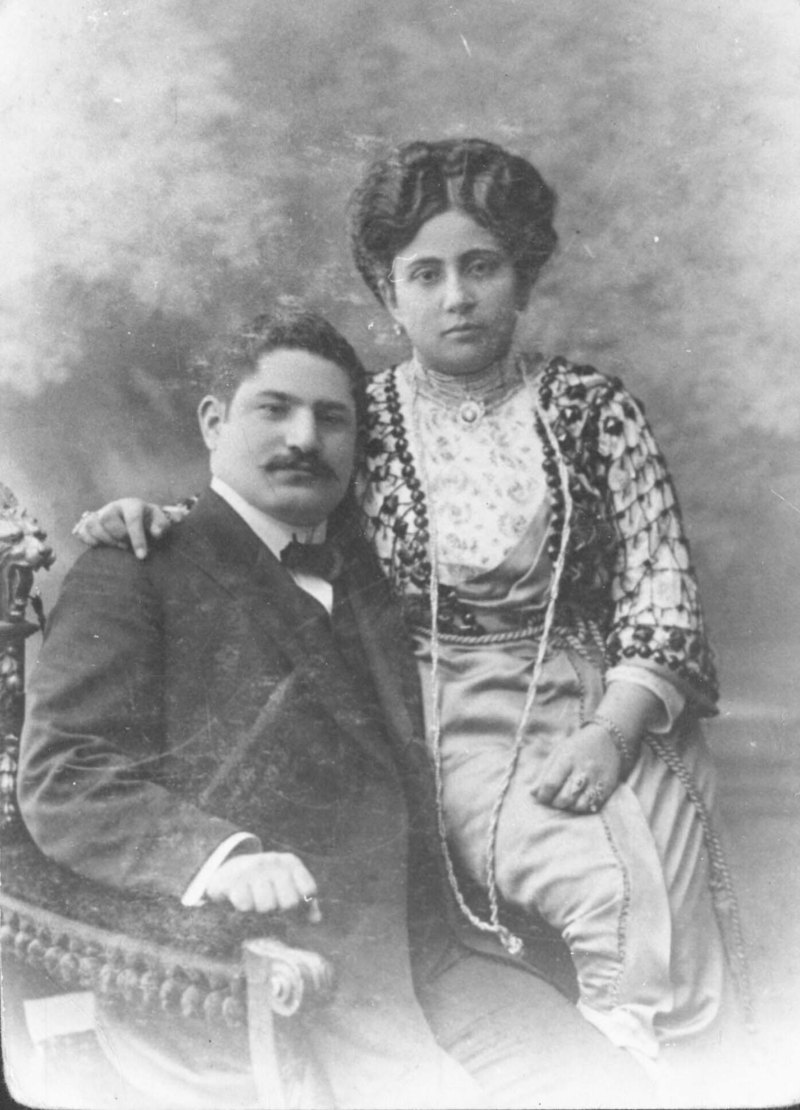
Bala bey Ashurbeyov

•Ashur bey Haji Imamverdi bey oghlu-elder grandson of Ashur khan Afshar possessed Sabunchu and Zabrat villages in Absheron, and also possessed arable lands and crocus plantations. After unsuccessful attempt of Huseyngulu khan to retrieve the throne in 1826, he escaped to Persia with his family.

•Ahmed bey Ashur bey oghlu-in 1826, escaped to Persia with his father and other members of the family.

•Nabat khanim Goja bey gizi (1795–1912) was Haji Imamverdi bey Ashur khan oghlu's granddaughter. Nabat khanim was married to wealthy merchant Haji Musa Rza Rzayev, from this marriage had a son Haji Abbasgulu Rzayev and daughters Ashraf and Gulbista. Nabat khanim possessed multi-million capital consisting of oil fields and apartment houses and was famed as philanthropist. She donated the great amount of money for construction of water conduit Shollar, and also participated in financing of hospitals in Sabunchu, where poor and orphans were treated at her expense. Nabat khanim participated in financing of a construction of the biggest mosque of Baku-Taza Pir, for which the well-known architect Zivar bay Ahmadbayov was invited. She allocated money for the architect and sent him to trip to the Eastern countries, where he had to learn the architecture of mosques. After his return he presented project of the mosque with two-tier minarets. The construction began in 1905 and ended in 1914. But because of the intervention of provincial authorities minarets were built only up to the first tier. Nabat khanim invited Haji Zeynalabdin Taghiyev for layer of the first stone to foundation of the mosque, who put the last stone at the end of the construction, but Nabat khanim couldn't live until the end of the construction and after her death her son Haji Abbasgulu Rzayev was engaged in this work.

•Teymur bey Gara bey oghlu (1834-September 1908)-was Haji Imamverdi bey Ashur khan oghlu's grandson. Teymur bey was the owner of extensive lands and oil fields in Sabunchu. He was engaged in charity work. In particular, schools and hospitals were built in Sabunchu and were reconstructed mosques at his expense. Teymur bey was married to Tutu khanim-inhabitant of Zabrat village and had two sons-Bala bey and Ali bey and also daughters-Javahir khanim, Beyim khanim and Umm Leyla khanim. In 1904, a mansion was built in Gogol street by Iosif Vikentyevich Goslavskiy's project, which Teymur bey presented to his son as a wedding gift. After his death, his wife fulfilling the deceased's will, sent his body accompanied by forty pilgrims to Karbala-the sacred for Muslim-Shias city. After burying her husband, she built mosque on his grave.

•Meshadi Aghasi bey Ashurbeyov-oilman. Possessed oil fields in Sabunchu. Died in 1925.

•Isa bey Haji Mehtigulu bey oghlu Ashurbeyov-philanthropist and social activist. Isa bey was born in 1878. Financed the newspaper "Irshad", which was published under Ahmed bey Aghaoghlu's edition. Was one of the leaders of "Hummet" party. Was the member of the administration of "Nijat" union. Died in 1938.

•Haji Ajdar bey Goja bey oghlu Ashurbeyov (1855–1921)-the well-known oilman and philanthropist. Haji Ajdar bey financed the construction of the Blue Mosque in Baku, the construction of which was continued from March 1912 to December 1913. The project of the mosque was by the architect Zivar bay Ahmadbayov.

•Bala bey Teymur bey oghlu Ashurbeyov-Teymur bey Ashurbeyov's son and the father of well-known Azerbaijani historian Sara Ashurbeyli. Bala bey was born in 1882. He was involved in entrepreneurial activity. After collapse of the Azerbaijan Democratic Republic he moved to Istanbul with his family. He returned to Baku with his brother's advice during the NEP period, where he was arrested and exiled to Karaganda, where he was shot in 1937. In 1965, Bala bey Ashurbeyov was posthumously rehabilitated.

•Ali bey Teymur bey oglu Ashurbeyov — a petroleum magnate and renowned philanthropist, alongside his brother Bala bey, served as one of the prominent arbitrators amidst intensifying competition in the oil industry. The company "Ali bey and Bala bey Ashurbeyov Brothers" was one of the most developed oil enterprises in Baku. The company's oil fields were located near the villages of Sabunchu and Zabrat. For many years, the Ashurbeyov fields were managed by mining engineer Lann, who later became the Minister of Mining Industry in Estonia. After the April occupation, Ali bey was arrested and detained in the Lyubyanka prison in Moscow. He was released only thanks to Nariman Narimanov, who was a distant relative of his brother Bala bey's wife, Ismet khanim. Ali bey died in 1940 from a heart attack. He personally financed the construction of the Juma Mosque.

•Sara Bala bey gizi Ashurbeyli (January 27, 1906 – July 17, 2001) - an Azerbaijani scholar, historian, and orientalist; Doctor of Historical Sciences (1966); Honored Scientist of the Azerbaijan SSR (1982); and recipient of the Azerbaijan SSR State Prize (1986). She was also a member of the Union of Artists of Azerbaijan. Sara Ashurbeyli was born in 1906 in Baku in a magnificent mansion designed by architect Iosif Goslavsky, into the family of oil industrialist and philanthropist Bala bey Ashurbeyov. She received her early education in Turkey at a French college and later graduated from the Faculty of Oriental Studies at Azerbaijan State University. She began her career at the History Museum of Azerbaijan, contributing to projects related to the depiction of various national minorities. In 1949, she defended her candidate dissertation at the Leningrad Institute of Oriental Studies, and in 1964, her doctoral dissertation at the Georgian Academy of Sciences. Sara khanim was renowned for her research on the history and architecture of medieval Baku. She worked as a leading researcher at the Institute of History, Archaeology, and Ethnography of the Azerbaijan Academy of Sciences and continued her work at the Azerbaijan National Academy of Sciences from 1993 until the end of her life. Her book on the history of the Shirvanshahs is considered one of the most significant academic studies on the subject.

•Igor Ashurbeyli (September 9, 1963)- born on September 9, 1963, in Baku. In 1985, he graduated from the Azerbaijan Institute of Oil and Chemistry and, in 1988, founded and headed the Cooperative Coordination-Production Union "Sosium." In 1990, he moved to Moscow, where he established and led the "Sosium" Scientific-Production Association. From 2000 to 2011, he served as the general director of the "Almaz" Scientific-Production Association, leading the development of the S-300, S-400, and S-500 anti-aircraft missile systems. He also developed the Russian Aerospace Defense System Concept. In 2013, Ashurbeyli founded the Aerospace International Research Center in Vienna and became the editor-in-chief of the "Room Space Journal." In 2016, he announced the creation of a virtual space nation called "Asgardia." A doctor of technical sciences, Ashurbeyli is the author of more than 100 scientific works and has been awarded various orders and medals. Among his accolades are the Russian Federation Government Award in Science and Technology, the Order of Honor, the G.K. Zhukov Medal, the "850th Anniversary of Moscow" Commemorative Medal, the "800th Anniversary of Nizhny Novgorod" Commemorative Medal (2021), the "200th Anniversary of the Ministry of Defense" Medal, the "Russian National Olympus" Award—"Industrial Scientist of the Year" nomination (2003), the "Person of the Year-2013" Award for his contributions to restoring historical traditions, and the Order of Saint Seraphim of Sarov.

•Danial Ahmed bey oghlu Ashurbeyov was born on May 19, 1976, in Baku. Director of directorate of general programs in Azerbaijan State Television and Radio.

== The mansion of the Ashurbeyovs ==
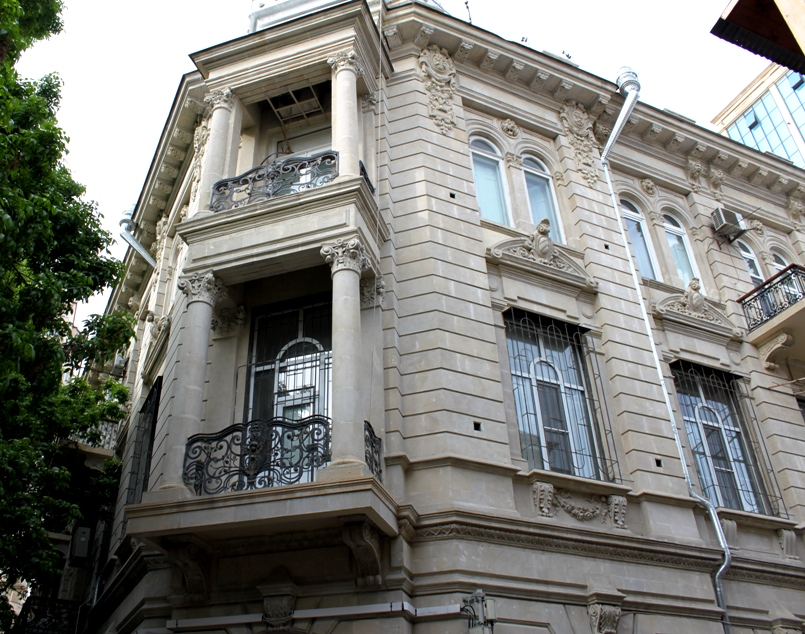
The mansion of the Ashurbeyovs

The mansion of the Ashurbeyovs was built in 1904, by the architect Iosif Vikentyevich Goslavsky's project in laundry (Gogol street) street. There was office of their firm on the first floor. On the second floor lived Bala bey with his family. Teymur bey's brother and Teymur bey's widow lived on the third floor. This mansion was Teymur bey's wedding gift to his younger son Bala bey. Being student in Tbilisi, Bala bey fell in love with Ismet khanim Sultanova. Then his father decided to build luxurious house.

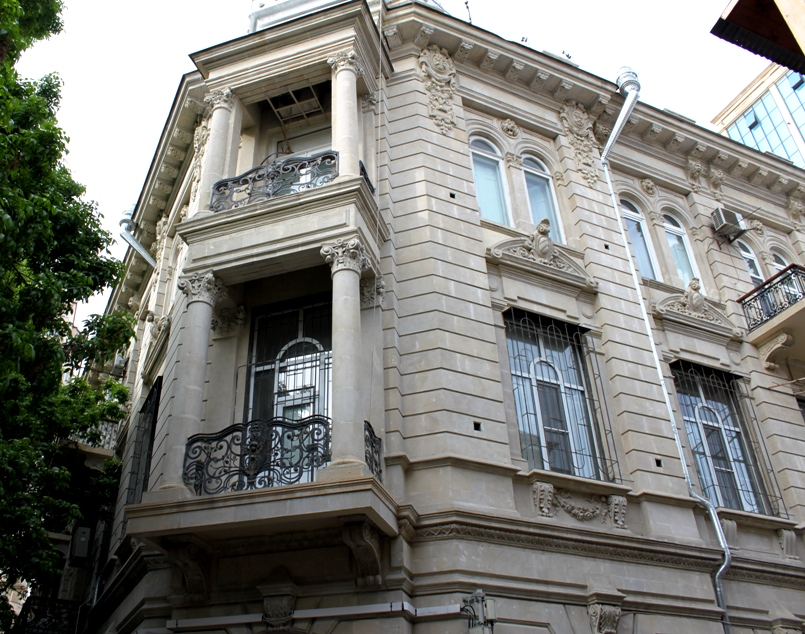

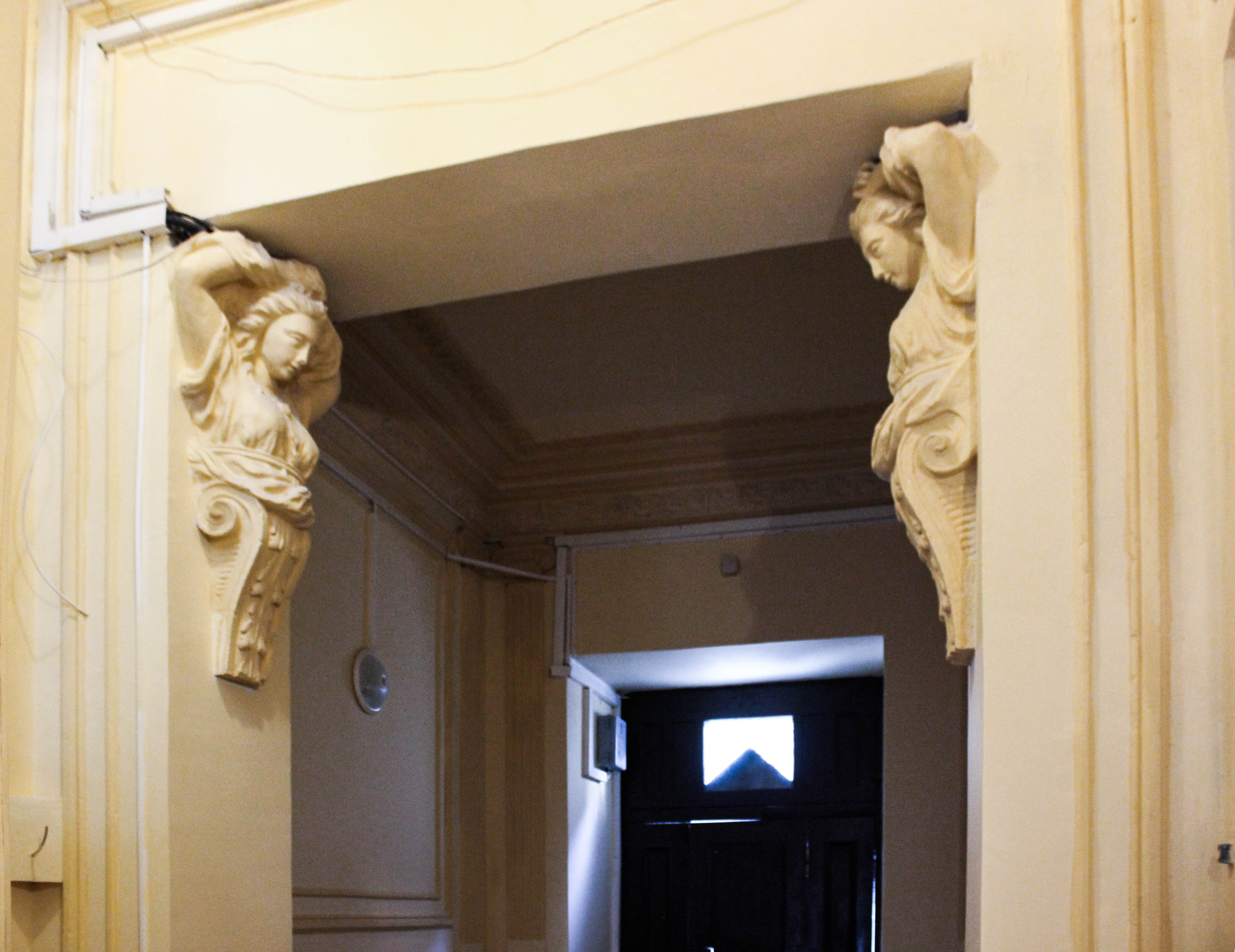

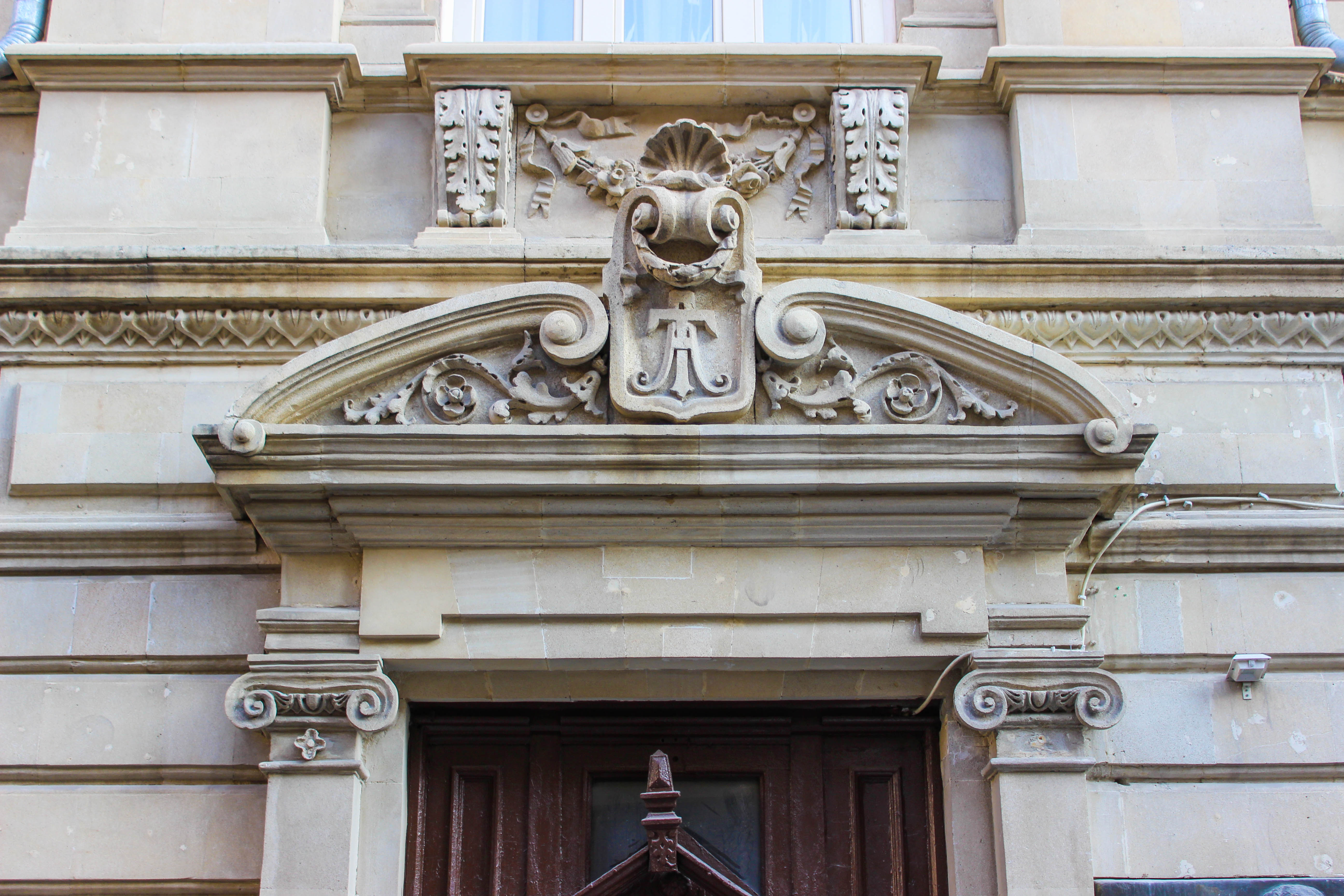

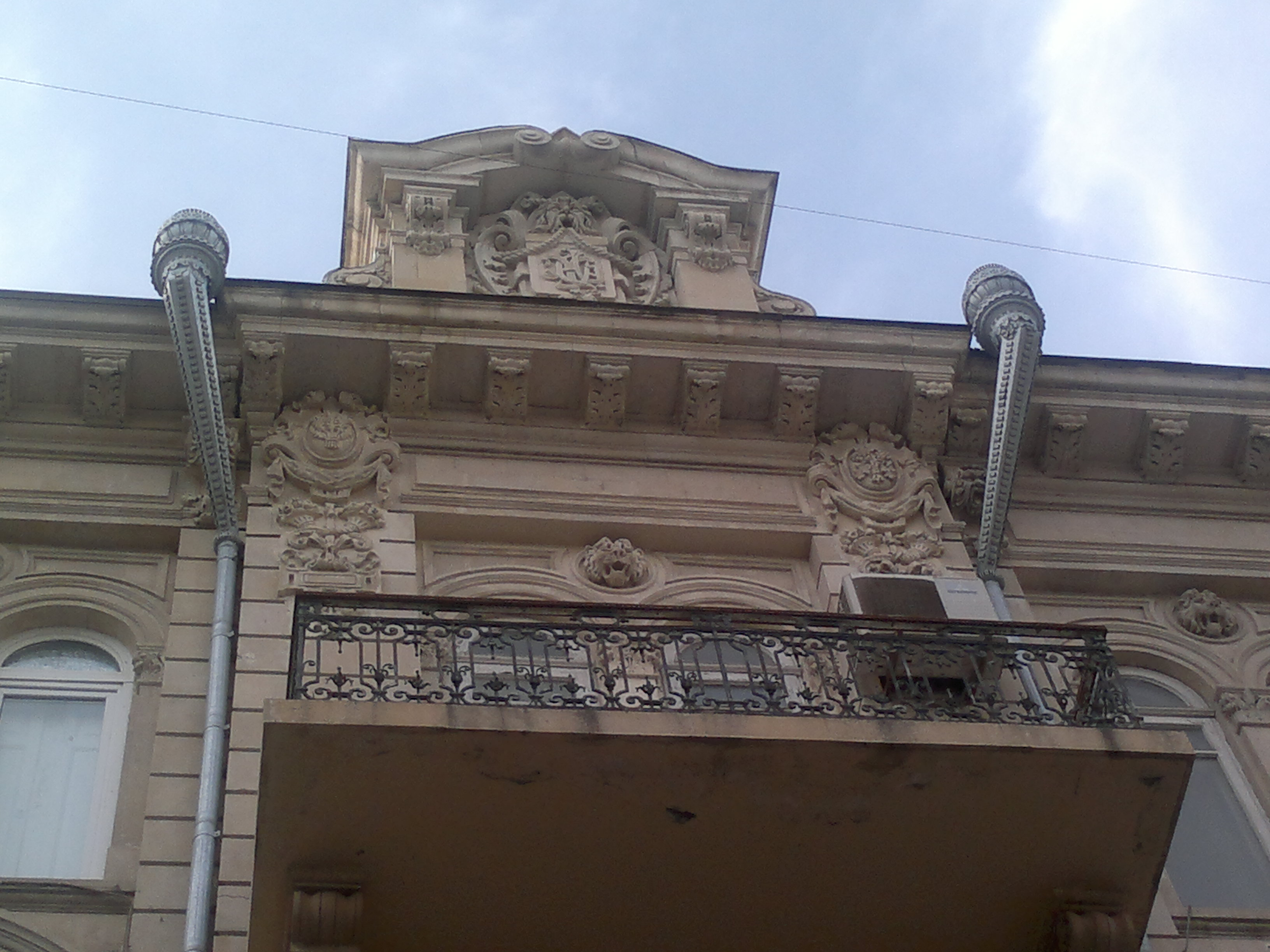

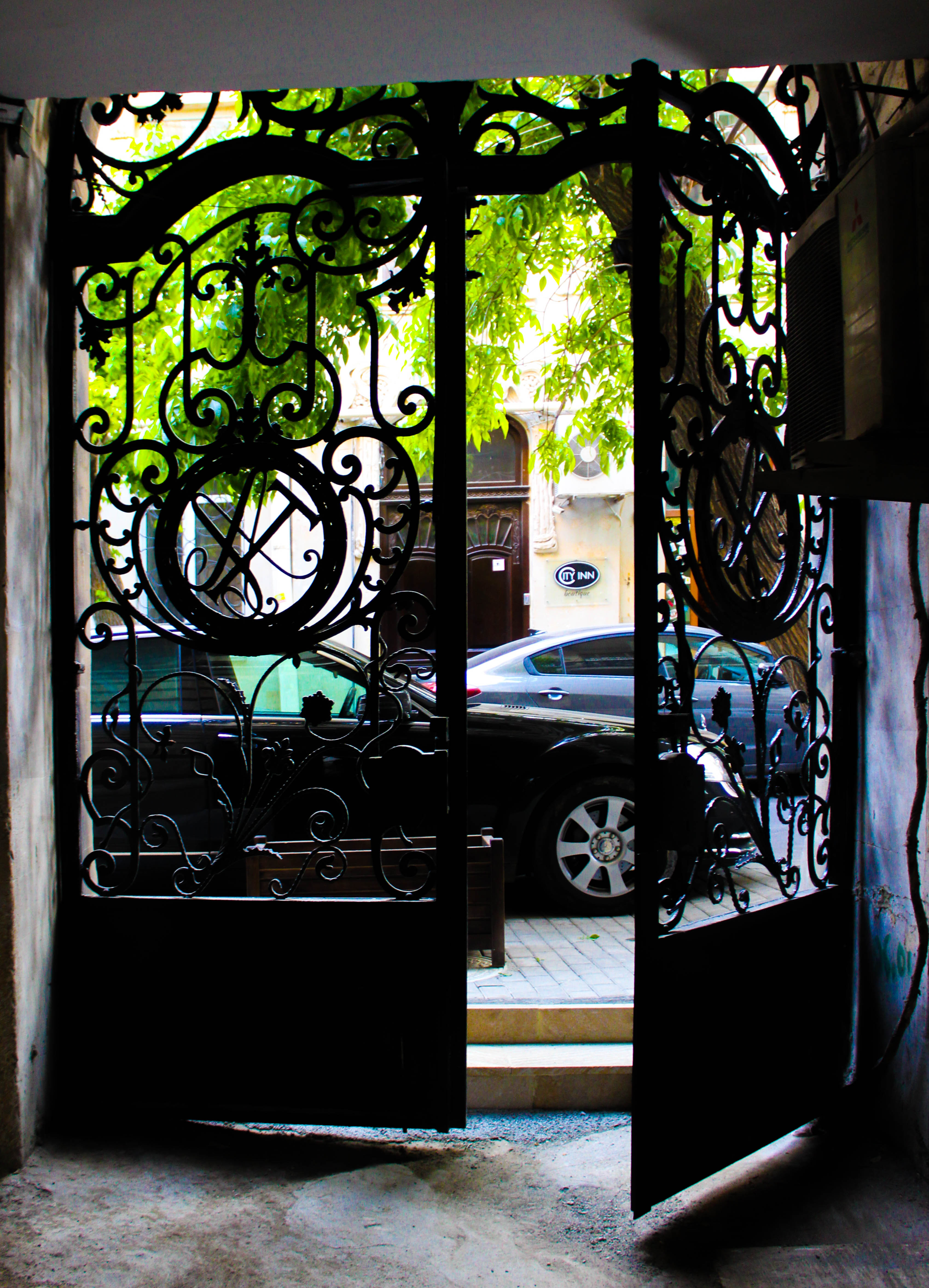

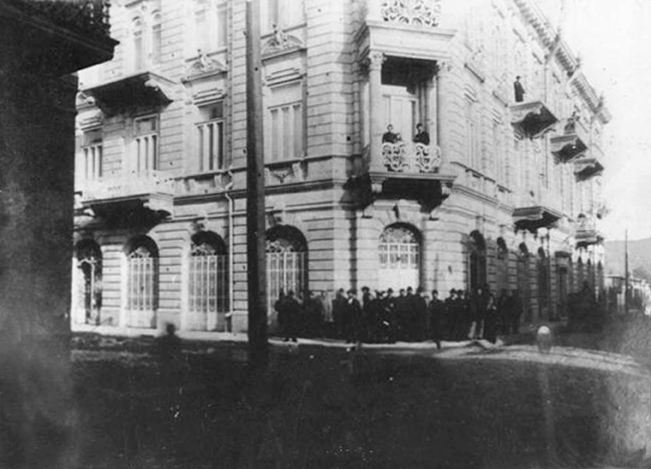

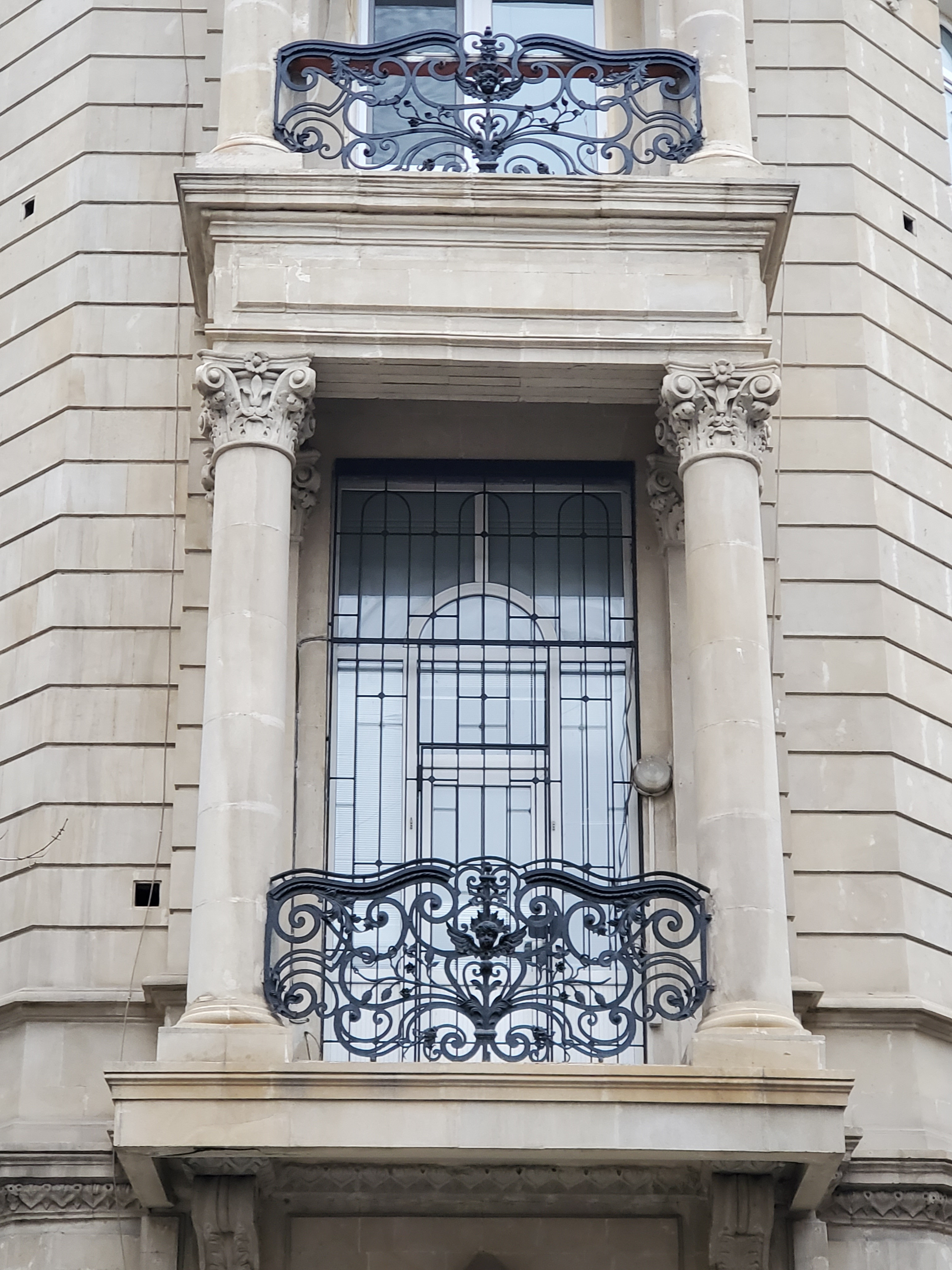

Main entrances of the house were adorned with paintings, in which participated well-known artist of Baku on Bala bey's invitation. During March incidents some part of the mansion was plundered, but governess of Bala bey's children a Frenchwoman Greylo hung the French flag out, posing it as the building of French mission and thereby she could guard the greater part of the house against the plunder.

=== The villa of the Ashurbeyovs ===
The Ashurbeyov Villa was constructed in 1901 on a 7-hectare estate, financed by Teymur bey Ashurbeyov. Various buildings located on the estate were arranged along an elongated area and distributed across upper and lower terraces. Alleys and pathways played a significant role in the planning of the estate. The central alley began at the main gates, traversed the entire property, and ended with stairs leading to the lower terrace. The villa's entrance architecture and layout lacked pronounced elements of grandeur or ostentation.

== Photo gallery ==
The Ashurbeyovs

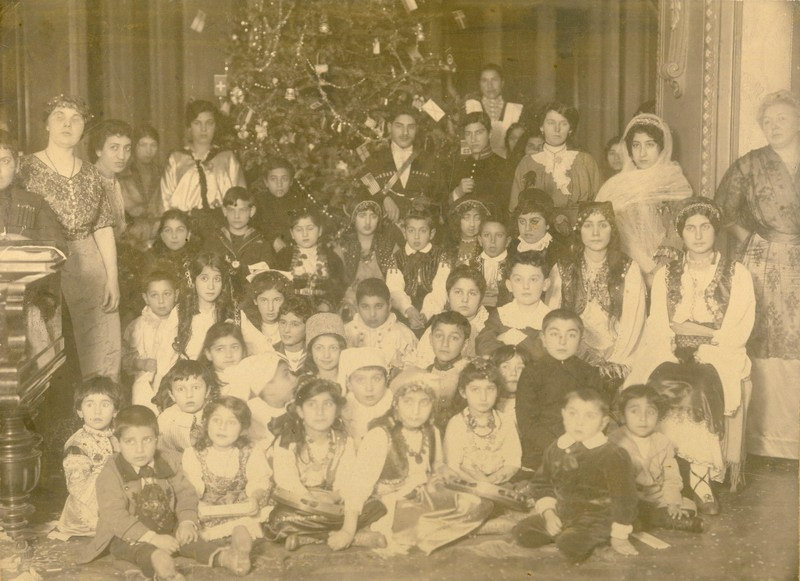
A New Year's tree in the house of Bala bey Ashurbeyov.In the bottom raw the first from the left side-Rasgad bey, the third-Sitara khanim, the fourth-Sara khanim, the fifth-Maryam khanim.

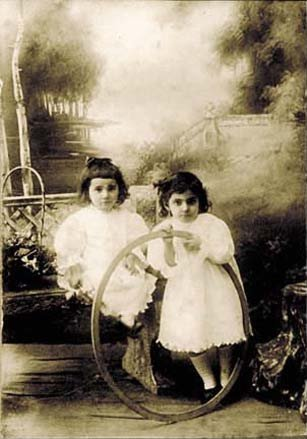
Sara Ashurbeyli with her sister Sitara.

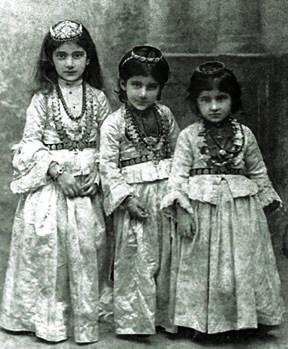
Sara Ashurbeyli with sisters.

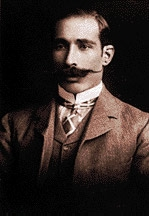
Haji Ajdar bey Ashurbeyov.

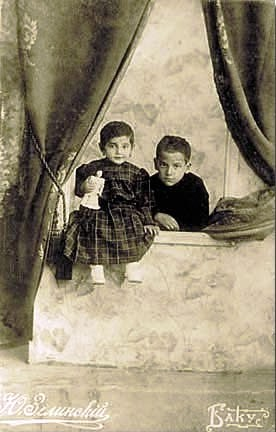
Sara Ashurbeyli with her cousin.

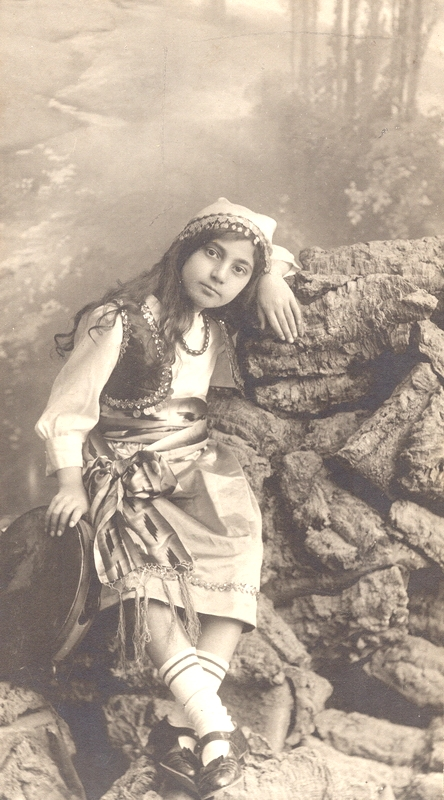
Sara Ashurbeyli in her childhood.

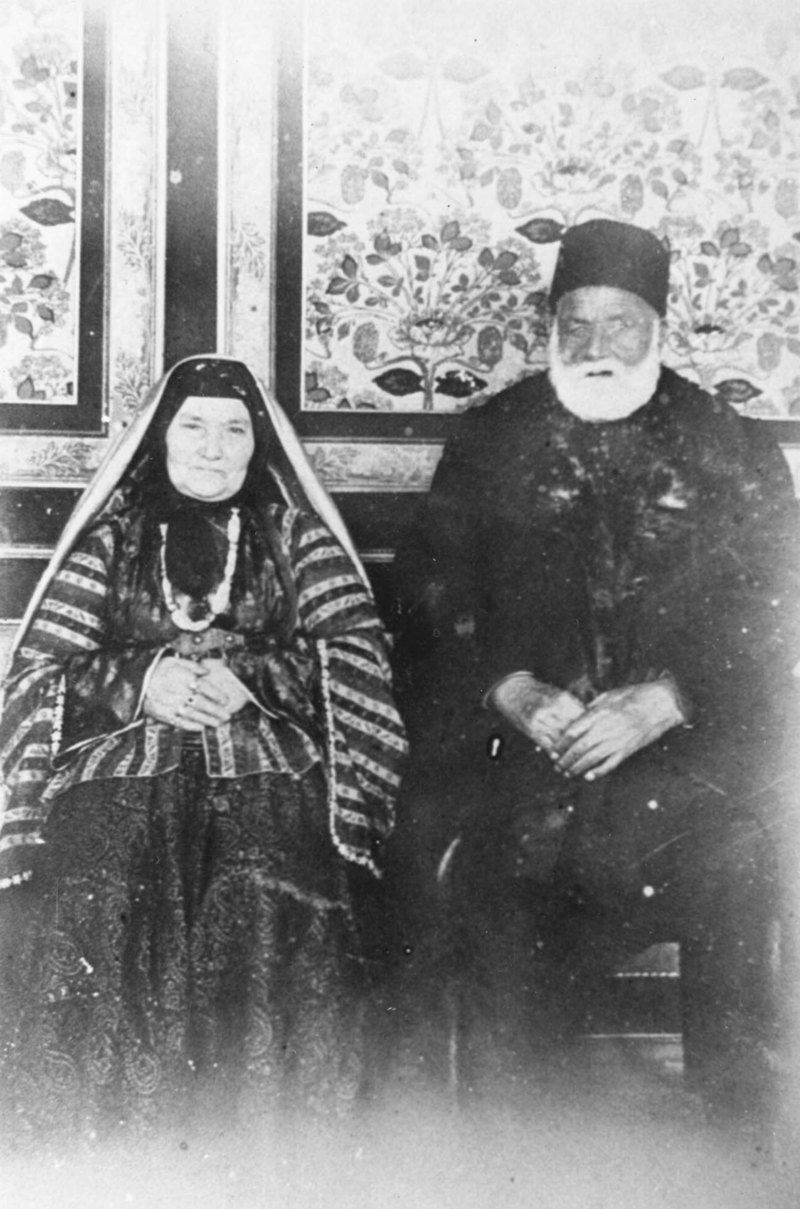
Teymur bey Ashurbeyov with his wife Tutu khanim.

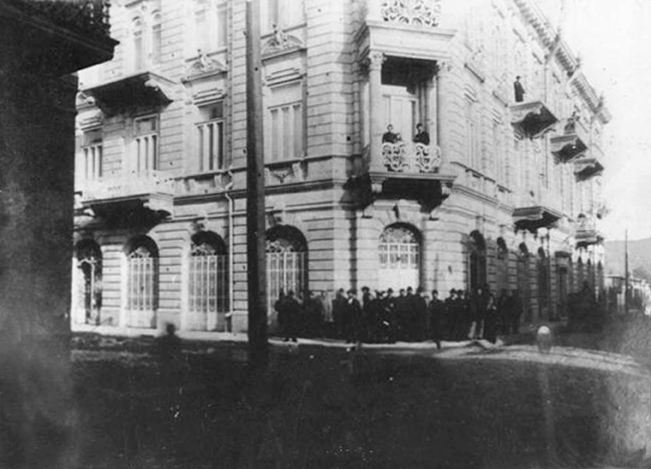
The mansion of the family, in 1904.

== Sources ==
- Фатуллаев, Шамиль Сейфулла оглы (1978), Градостроительство Баку XIX—начала XX веков / Под ред. проф. В. И. Пилявского, Стройиздат
