= Mirza Bala Mammadzade =

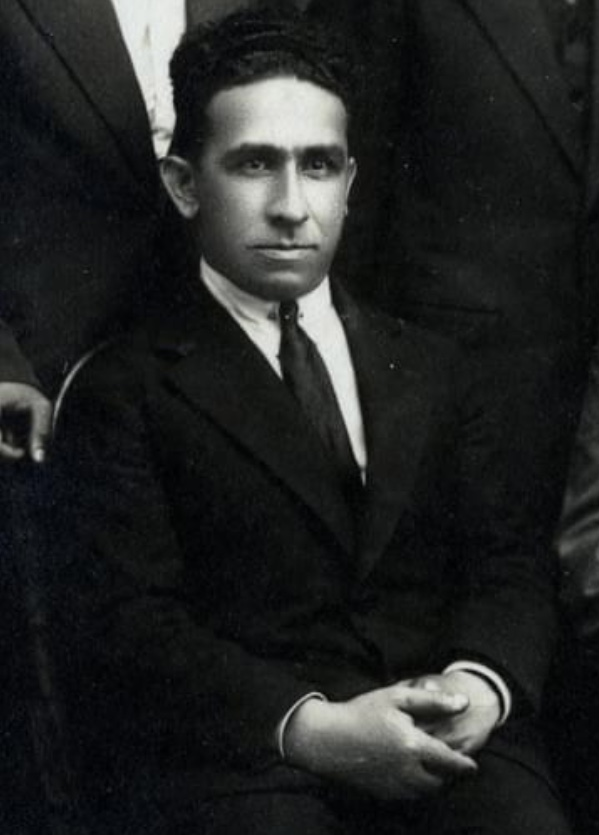

Leader of the “Müsavat” (Muslim Democratic Party)
- In office 7 March 1955 – 8 March 1959
- Preceded by: Mammad Amin Rasulzade
- Succeeded by: Kerim Oder

Mirza Bala Mammadzade (13 August 1898, Zira, Baku uezd, Baku Governorate, Russian Empire – 8 March 1959, Istanbul, Turkey) was an Azerbaijani public and political figure, publicist, translator, playwright, and historian. He was the second chairman of the Musavat Party.

== Early life ==
Mirza Bala Mammadzade was born on 13 August 1898 in the village of Zira on the Absheron Peninsula, into a fisherman's family.

His father moved to Baku in the early years of the 20th century in order to support his family and settled in the Çambarakand district of the city. His childhood was spent in Çambarakand, Baku. After graduating from the 7th "Rus-Tatar" school (1914) and the 3rd higher primary school, he continued his education at the Baku Technical Industrial School. He began his literary activity during his student years, and in 1912 his book titled "Nəfi-elm və yaxud Elmin Sonu" (“The Benefit of Knowledge or the End of Knowledge”) was published at Isabey Ashurbeyov’s Kaspi printing house. His close contact with progressive intellectuals within the “Məhəmmədiyyə” (Muhammadiyya) society played an important role in shaping his worldview. In 1915, Mirza Bala Mammadzade began contributing articles to the newspaper “Açıq söz” (“Open Word”), published by Mammad Amin Rasulzade, and later became actively involved in its editorial work. At the same time, he served as the editor-in-chief of the weekly journal “Bəsirət” (“Insight”).

== Works ==
After the February Revolution of 1917, he became actively involved in open political activities and joined the ranks of the Musavat Party. In one of his articles, he addressed the youth, stating:

Free your homeland, which is your sacred Kaaba… It is your homeland that keeps you alive as human beings. Only within your homeland can your language, honour, and dignity remain secure. (Açıq söz, 4 January 1918)

Shortly after the proclamation of the Azerbaijan Democratic Republic, M. B. Mammadzade served as co-editor, together with T. F. Hajizade, of the journal “Gənclər yurdu” (“Youth Homeland”), the organ of the “Gənclər cəmiyyəti” (“Youth Society”) established under the Musavat Party, which was published between June and November 1918. During the same period, Mirza Bala's pamphlet “İki inqilab arasında” (“Between Two Revolutions”) was published in Tbilisi. The booklet provided a general overview of the history of the press, education, literature, theatre, religion, and women's issues in Azerbaijan between 1905 and 1917. M. B. Mammadzade also worked as a stenographer in the Parliament of the Azerbaijan Democratic Republic, and in October 1919 he was elected a member of the Baku Committee of the Musavat Party. In September of the same year, his play “Bakı uğrunda mübarizə” (“The Struggle for Baku”), which dealt with the March 1918 genocide, was staged at the Azerbaijan State Theatre.

== Activities after the occupation of Azerbaijan ==
After the occupation of Azerbaijan, M. B. Mammadzade became the chairman of the Central Committee of the clandestine Musavat organization in Baku and continued to publish its organ, the newspaper “İstiqlal” (“Independence”), until 1923. During this period, he worked as a translator at the Supreme Council of National Economy of Azerbaijan and as a secondary school teacher. He also maintained his connection with the press, publishing a series of articles on Azerbaijani history in the journal “Yeni yıldız” (“New Star”), and in 1922 he published the book “Azərbaycan türk mətbuatı” (“The Azerbaijani Turkic Press”) in Baku.

In July 1923, after the location of the “İstiqlal” printing house was discovered by government authorities and members of the clandestine Müsavat organization were arrested, Mammadzade managed to avoid arrest. He subsequently distributed leaflets opposing the statements made by a group of detainees who had declared support for Soviet rule.

Until the end of spring 1924, M. B. Mammadzade continued his clandestine activities and, in May, moved to the city of Anzali in Iran, where he took charge of the activities of Azerbaijani émigrés. After living for some time in Tabriz, he later worked as a road construction engineer-technician in the area around the city of Sulduz. During this period, he sent articles to the journal “Yeni Qafqaziya” (“New Caucasus”), published in Istanbul under the leadership of Mammad Amin Rasulzadeh.

A central theme of Mammadzade's journalism during this period was the criticism of Bolshevism, Soviet ideology and the Soviet party-state system, as well as the exposure of the Soviet press as part of the propaganda apparatus. In 1927, he moved to Istanbul, where his books “Azərbaycan misaqi-millisi: 28 Mayıs İstiqlal Bəyannaməsinin təhlili” (“The Azerbaijani National Pact: An Analysis of the 28 May Independence Declaration”) and “Ermənilər və İran” (“The Armenians and Iran”) were published.

He closely collaborated with the journals “Azəri türk” (1928–1931) and “Odlu yurd” (1929–1931), published under the editorship of Mammad Amin Rasulzade, as well as with the journal “Azərbaycan yurd bilgisi” (“Azerbaijan Homeland Knowledge”). As one of the main contributors to “Azəri türk” and “Odlu yurd”, his articles such as “Fətəli xan Xoyski” and “Doktor Həsən bəy” are considered valuable for characterizing the statesmen of the Azerbaijan Democratic Republic.

In his article “Solovkidən gələn səslər” (“Voices from Solovki”), he described the harsh conditions of Azerbaijani independence activists exiled to the Solovki Islands—referred to as a “terrifying corner of nature”—where they were subjected to severe torture in Soviet prison camps, yet remained unbroken and even sang the anthem of independence under extreme conditions.

In his works such as “Bolşevizm və türkçülük” (“Bolshevism and Turkism”), “Azərbaycan və bolşeviklər” (“Azerbaijan and the Bolsheviks”), “Mədəniləşdirmə ünvanı altında ruslaşdırma” (“Russification under the Guise of Civilisation”), “Kommunistlər və istila” (“Communists and Occupation”), “On illik istismar” (“Ten Years of Exploitation”), “Rusiya əsarətində türk Bakı” (“Turkic Baku under Russian Subjugation”), “Sovet Azərbaycanda — Hürriyyəti-mətbuat” (“Freedom of the Press in Soviet Azerbaijan”), and “Yeni türk əlifbası və bolşevik mətbuatı” (“The New Turkic Alphabet and the Bolshevik Press”), he analysed the internal structure of Bolshevism and criticised the anti-national policies of the Soviet government.

During his years in exile, M. B. Mammadzade graduated from the Faculty of Law at Istanbul University.

In 1931, following a Soviet demand, the Turkish government banned the activities of the foreign bureau of the Musavat Party in Turkey. As a result, M. B. Mammadzade, together with Mammad Amin Rasulzade and other political associates, left Istanbul and moved to Warsaw.

During this period, he published numerous articles on the issue of Azerbaijan’s independence in the newspaper “İstiqlal” (“Independence”) (1932–1934) and the journal “Qurtuluş” (“Salvation”) (1934–1938), both published in Berlin under the editorship of Mammad Amin Rasulzade. Mammadzade also took an active part in the 1936 conference of the “Milli Azərbaycan ‘Müsavat’ xalq firqəsi” (“National Azerbaijan ‘Musavat’ People's Party”) held in Warsaw. In the bulletins published by the Musavat Party, he published numerous articles exposing the Russian colonial system of administration. He also delivered presentations at several academic conferences held in Poland.

In 1938, his books “Milli Azərbaycan hərəkatı” (“The National Azerbaijani Movement”) and “Müsavat” xalq firqəsinin tarixi (“History of the ‘Musavat’ People's Party”) were published in Berlin by the printing house of the journal “Qurtuluş” (“Salvation”).

With the outbreak of the Second World War and the occupation of Poland by Germany, M. B. Mammadzade returned to Istanbul. During this period, he published numerous articles on Azerbaijani history in newspapers and journals such as “Milliyyət” (“Nationality”) and “Cümhuriyyət” (“Republic”), as well as in the “Türk Ensiklopediyası” (“Turkish Encyclopedia”), the “İslam Ensiklopediyası” (“Islamic Encyclopedia”), and other publications.

In 1949, with his close involvement, the “Azərbaycan Kültür Dərnəyi” (“Azerbaijan Cultural Association”) was established in Ankara. In 1951, his work “Azərbaycan tarixində türk Albaniya” (“Turkic Albania in Azerbaijani History”) was published by this association. From 1952 onward, he also published numerous articles on Azerbaijani history in the journal “Azərbaycan” (“Azerbaijan”) issued by the association in Ankara.

Beginning in 1954, he worked at the Institute for the Study of the USSR in Munich, where he served for two years as chairman of the academic council and for another two years as deputy chairman. He also published articles in various Turkish newspapers and journals, strongly criticising the totalitarian regime in the Soviet Union.

His works, including “Proletar ədəbiyyatı milliyyətçi ədəbiyyatın vahid cəbhəsi qarşısında” (“Proletarian Literature Facing the United Front of National Literature”), “Ədəbi hakimiyyət qovğası” (“Struggle for Literary Authority”), “Azəri türk ədəbiyyatının dünəni və bu günü” (“The Past and Present of Azerbaijani Turkic Literature”), “Müasir Azərbaycan şairləri” (“Contemporary Azerbaijani Poets”), “Romantik və realist cərəyanlarının mücadiləsi” (“The Struggle Between Romantic and Realist Currents”), “Milli dil və milli kültür” (“National Language and National Culture”), “Cəfər Cabbarlı” (“Jafar Jabbarli”), “Mirzə Ələkbər Sabir” (“Mirza Alakbar Sabir”), “Sovet dil siyasətinin bugünkü səhifəsi” (“The Current State of Soviet Language Policy”), “Dədə Qorqud” (“Dede Korkut”), and “Milli dastanlarımıza dair” (“On Our National Epics”), present analyses of the history and development of Azerbaijani literature and culture, as well as the nature of Russification policies in Azerbaijan in the fields of language, culture, and literature.

Under the pseudonyms “Mirza Bala”, “Nuhoğlu”, “A. Kut”, “M. M. Məmmədzadə”, “M. B. Daşdəmir”, and “Əli Kutluk”, he authored more than 2,000 articles. After the death of Mammad Amin Rasulzade in 1955, M. B. Mammadzade assumed leadership of the Musavat Party and the Azerbaijani National Center.

== Position on the Wiesbaden Conference ==
In the journal “Azərbaycan” (“Azerbaijan”) published by the “Azərbaycan Kültür Dərnəyi” (“Azerbaijan Cultural Association”), Mirza Bala Mammadzade's extensive article titled “Qafqaz ölkələri istiqlal elanın 40-cı ildönümü münasibətilə” (“On the 40th Anniversary of the Declaration of Independence of the Caucasian Countries”) was considered significant for its assessment of the Caucasus question, as well as the region's place and role in international relations.

The Wiesbaden Conference (1951), at which prominent representatives of the Azerbaijani political émigré community such as Jeyhun Hajibeyli, Akbar agha Sheikhulislamov, and Ismail Akbar signed a joint declaration with Russian émigré organizations on the creation of a “united anti-Bolshevik front,” led to serious dissatisfaction among Azerbaijani émigré organizations.

In his article “Milli İstiqlal davamızın bugünkü səhifəsi” (“The Current Page of Our National Independence Struggle”), published in the journal “Qafqazya” (“Caucasus”, August 1952, No. 13), Mammadzade both exposed the intentions of Russian political émigrés—whose goal was the establishment of a “united and indivisible Russia”—and criticized the incorrect positions of non-Russian émigrés, including Azerbaijanis, who participated in the Wiesbaden Conference. He argued that “turning our national independence struggle into a matter of negotiation with the Russians serves to facilitate the aims and actions of Russian imperialists.”

In his article “Hər şeydən öncə milli istiqlal” (“National Independence Above All”), he sharply criticized the American committee that coordinated and financed Russian émigré organizations and organized the Wiesbaden Conference, stating that it undermined the right of the peoples of the Soviet Union to national independence.

In another article published in “Birləşik Qafqasya” (“United Caucasus”), the organ of the Caucasian Independence Committee, he highlighted the history and path of the Caucasian peoples’ independence struggle. In his writings, Mammadzade criticized Russian émigré groups that refused to recognize the right to independence of non-Russian peoples in the USSR, as well as the Soviet regime and communist ideology, while also addressing issues related to literary and cultural life.

On 18 September 1954, the new Minister of Internal Affairs of the Azerbaijan SSR, Guskov, sent a letter to the First Secretary of the Central Committee of the Communist Party of Azerbaijan, Mir Teymur Yaqubov, informing him about the presence of politically harmful books in libraries and proposing their immediate removal. According to a decision adopted on 9 October 1954, the works of 21 authors, including those of Mirza Bala Mammadzade, were removed from libraries.

He died on 8 March 1959 in Istanbul due to heart disease. He was buried at the Karacaahmet Cemetery.
