= Sabunçu, Baku =

Sabunçu
- Municipality
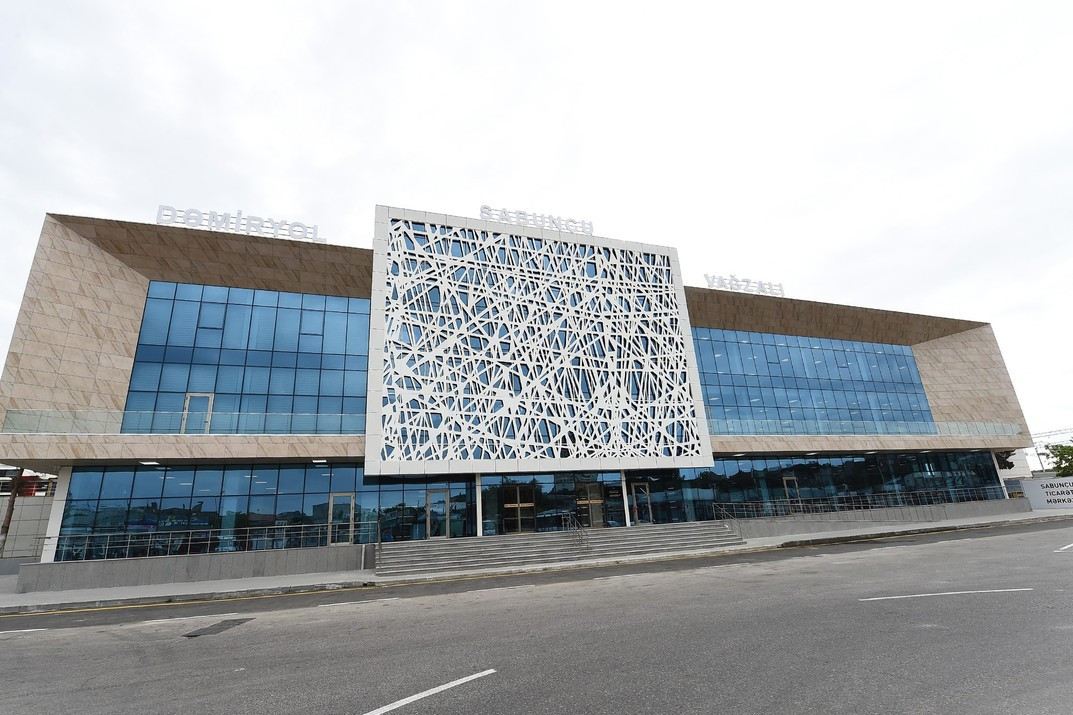
- Sabunchu Station, 2019

- Location within Azerbaijan
- Coordinates: 40°26′33″N 49°56′53″E
- Country: Azerbaijan
- City: Baku
- Raion: Sabunçu

Population (2013)
  - Total: 33,400
- Time zone: UTC+4 (AZT)
  - Summer (DST): UTC+5 (AZT)

Sabunchu (Azerbaijani: Sabunçu, lit. 'soapmaker') is a settlement and municipality in the Sabunchu Rayon of the capital city of Baku, Azerbaijan. It has a population of 33,400.

== History ==
Until the beginning of the 20th century, the Sabunçu region was producing 35 percent of Baku's oil. It was also the place where the first, Baku-Sabunchu electrified railway system in USSR, built by Chingiz Ildyrym in 1924 was established.

== Geography ==
The town, seat of Sabunchu Rayon, is located in the north-eastern suburb of the city of Baku and is part of its metropolitan area, situated 12 km from Baku International Airport "Heydar Aliyev".

== Transportation ==
Baku suburban railway

== Notable natives ==
- Nikolai Baibakov — People's Commissar of the USSR Oil Industry (1944–1946), Oil Minister of the USSR (1948–1955), Hero of Socialist Labor.
- Richard Sorge — one of the best-known Soviet intelligence officers of the Second World War, Hero of the Soviet Union.
- Igor Ashurbeyli
- Ashurbeyov-Well-known family

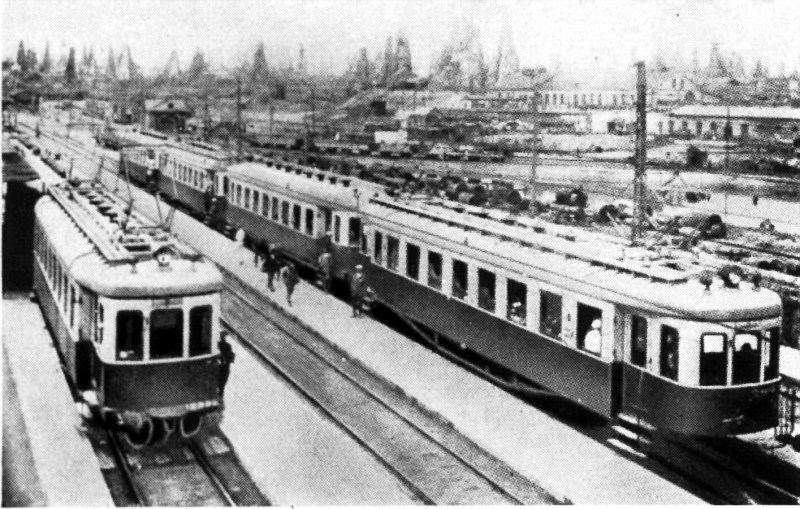
Sabunchu Railway Station in 1926
