= Ashurbeyov House =

- Azerbaijani: Aşurbəyovun evi
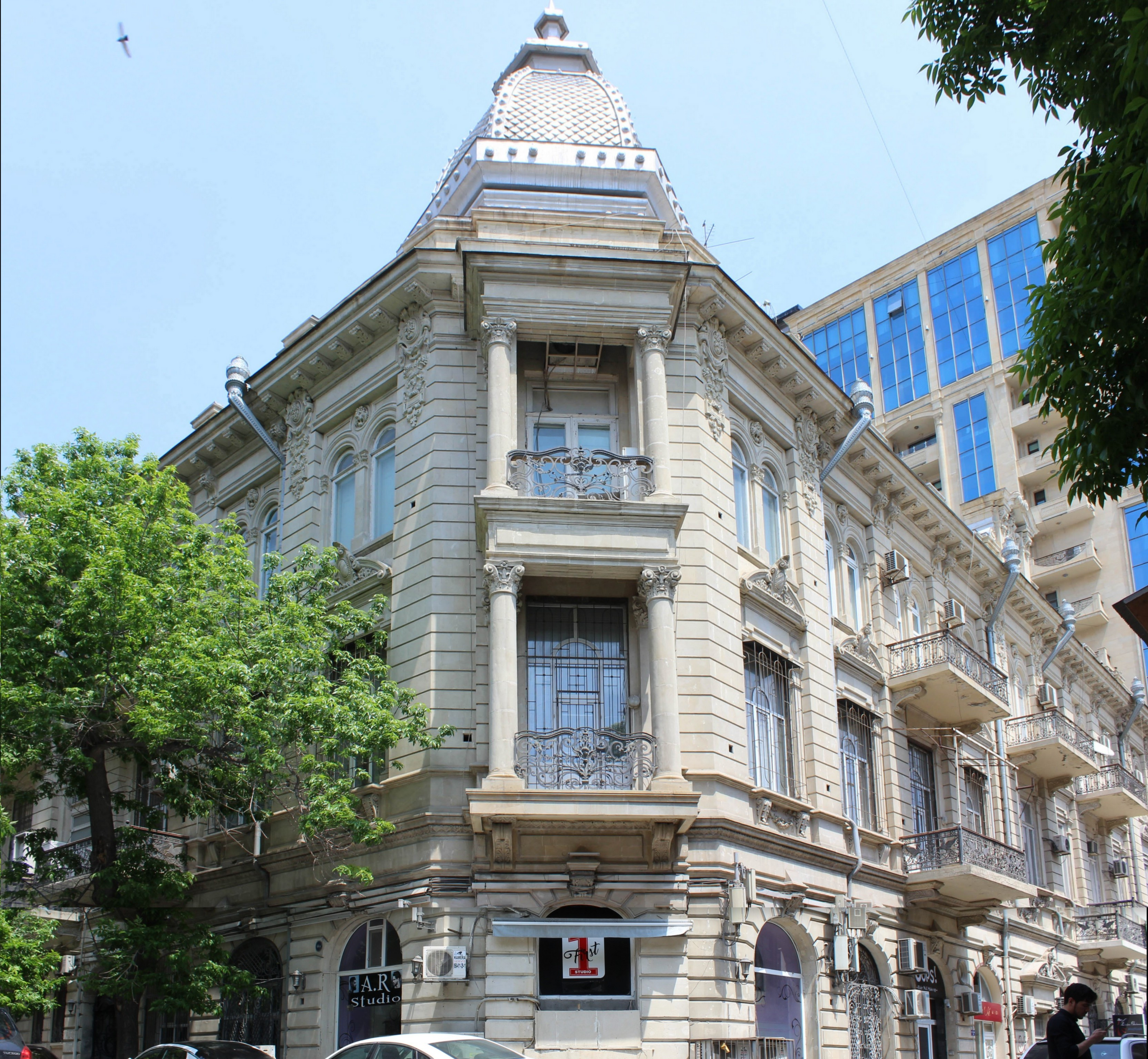

General information
- Type: Mansion
- Location: Vidadi Street, Sabail, Baku, Azerbaijan
- Completed: 1904
- Owner: Bala bey Ashurbeyov

Design and construction
- Architect: Józef Gosławski

Ashurbeyov House (Azerbaijani: Aşurbəyovun evi) — was an Azerbaijani noble family's mansion built by Teymur bey Ashurbeyov for his younger son Bala bey as a wedding gift. Built in 1904, this mansion is Chief Architect of Baku Józef Gosławski’s final project.

== Introduction ==
Ashurbeyov House is located at 28 Gogol Street at the corner of 148 Tserkovniy Street and 189 Kamenistaya Street. The mansion was built for Teymur bey Ashurbeyov by the architect Iosif Vikentyevich Goslavsky in 1904. The three-floor building with an area of about …. square meters is located in central Baku. The rooms facing the streets Gogol and Kamenistaya are arranged in two rows. All the buildings with a rectangular backyard and overlooking Tserkovnaya Street are one-row and compact. They are below ground. The stairs are located on mutually perpendicular axes, and the entrance and rear stairs take a responsible position in the structure of the main walls. There is an indirect gallery isolated from the mansion. The corners are cut at the angle of 45 degrees. The rooms are wide. Each floor has a balcony, with corners being in open- oriel window style.

There was a calligraphic monogram “T. A. A. - Teymur bey and Aslan bey Ashurbeyov on the facade of the building. Bala bey had invited a famous painter of Baku to create patterns for the front doors, which faced the former streets of Tserkovniy and Kamenistaya. Unfortunately, only part of these patterns, namely the painting "Oasis" has survived to this day.

== History ==
The mansion was built by Teymur bey Ashurbeyov for his younger son Bala bey as a wedding gift. Their company's headquarters and Georgian princess Dadiani's apartment were located on the first floor. Bala bey together with his family lived on the second floor, and his parents lived together with his brother Ali bey on the third floor.

The family had to hide in Sabunchu during the 1918 genocide. French Grailot, the governess of Bala bey s' children, guarding the house from the Dashnaks. Historian-scientist Sara Ashurbeyli, who was born in this house, in her memories wrote that the French governess hung a French flag out, posing it as the building of French mission and thereby she could guard the greater part of the house against the plunder. However, the Dashnaks attacked the other part of the mansion and plundered Ali Bey's apartment, destroying the luxurious 4-meter mirrors, beautifully painted wallpapers and wall paintings of the main door. The Ashurbeyov could return home only after the establishment of the Azerbaijan Democratic Republic.

Ashurbeyov House was also confiscated following the Red Army invasion of Azerbaijan in April 1920. Bala bey Ashurbeyov moved to Istanbul together with his family and lived there until 1925 before returning to Baku, in the hope that the harassment to which they were subjected will never happen again. In 1937, he was shot due to Stalinist repression.

== Photos ==
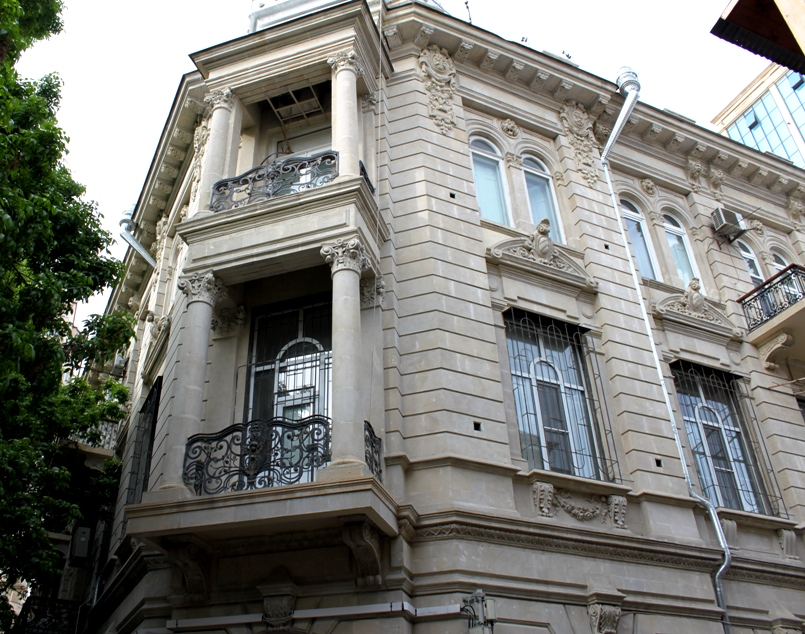

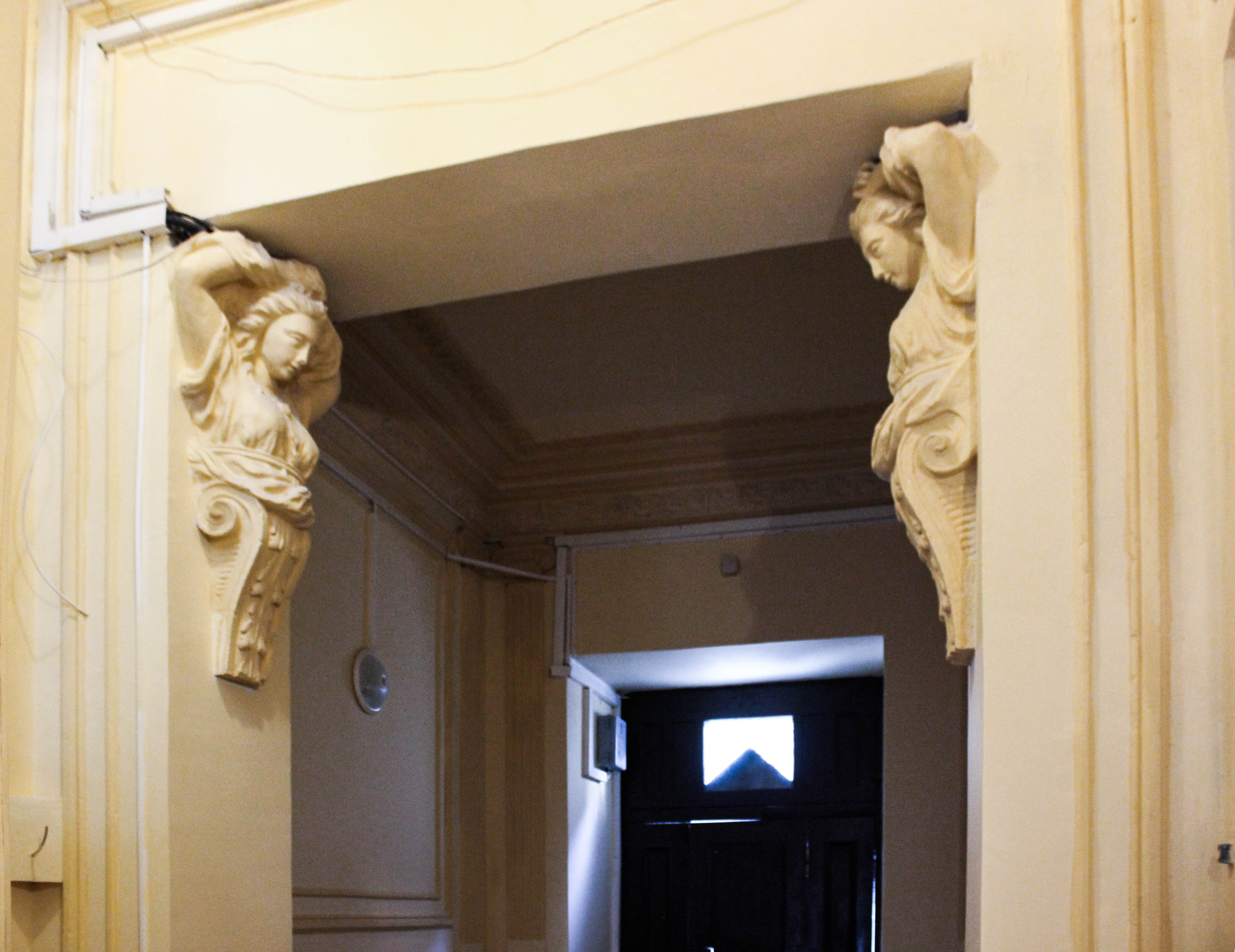

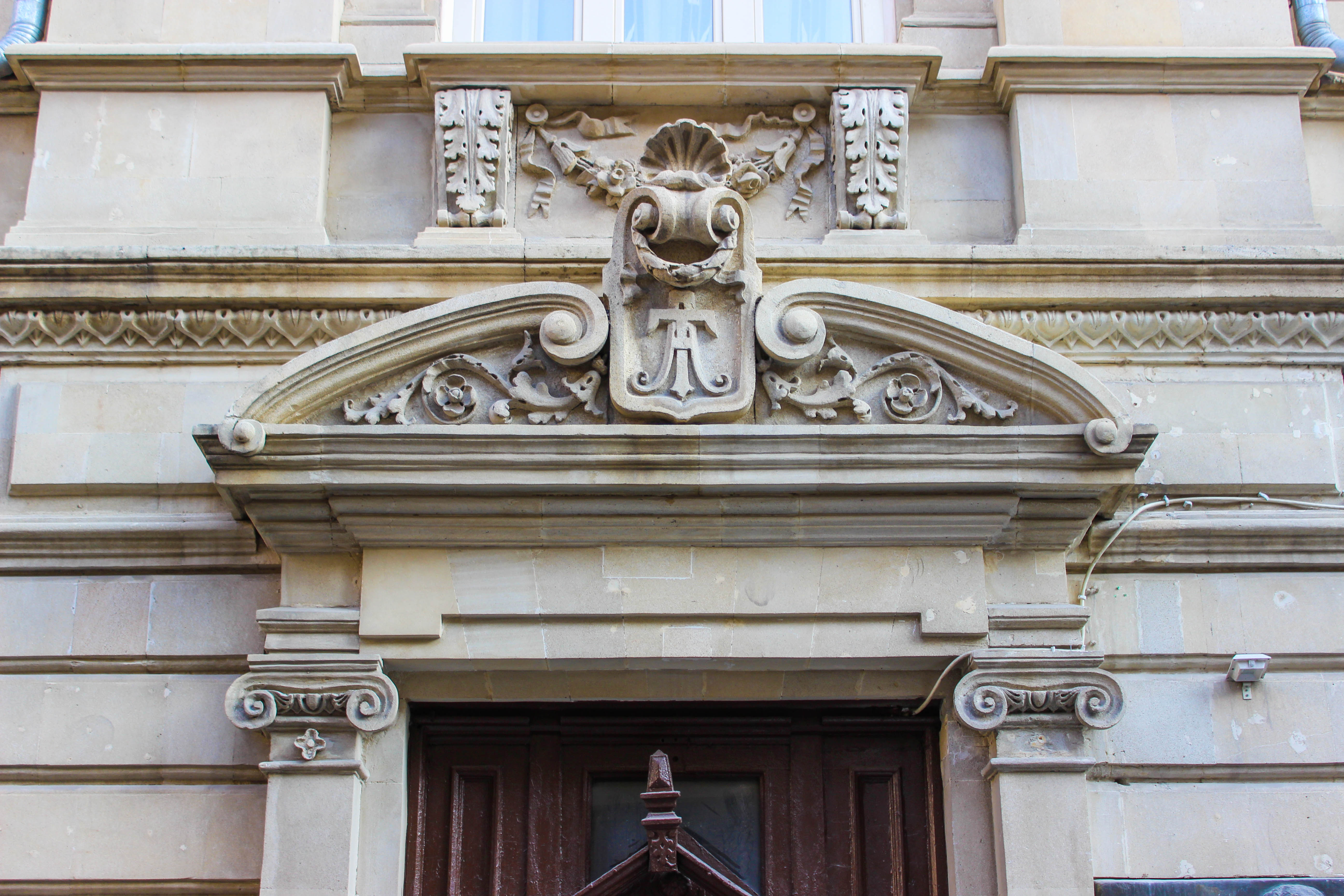

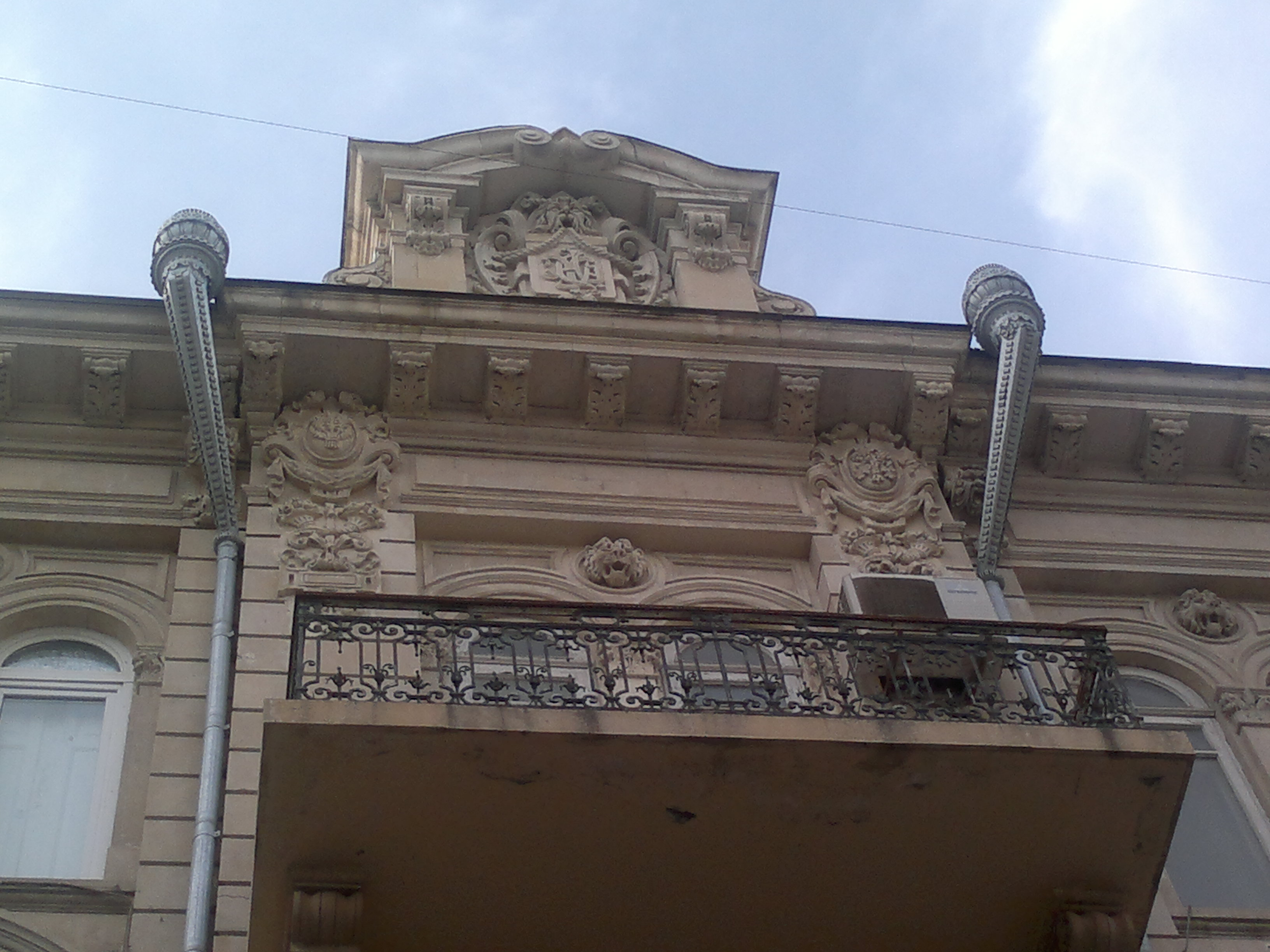

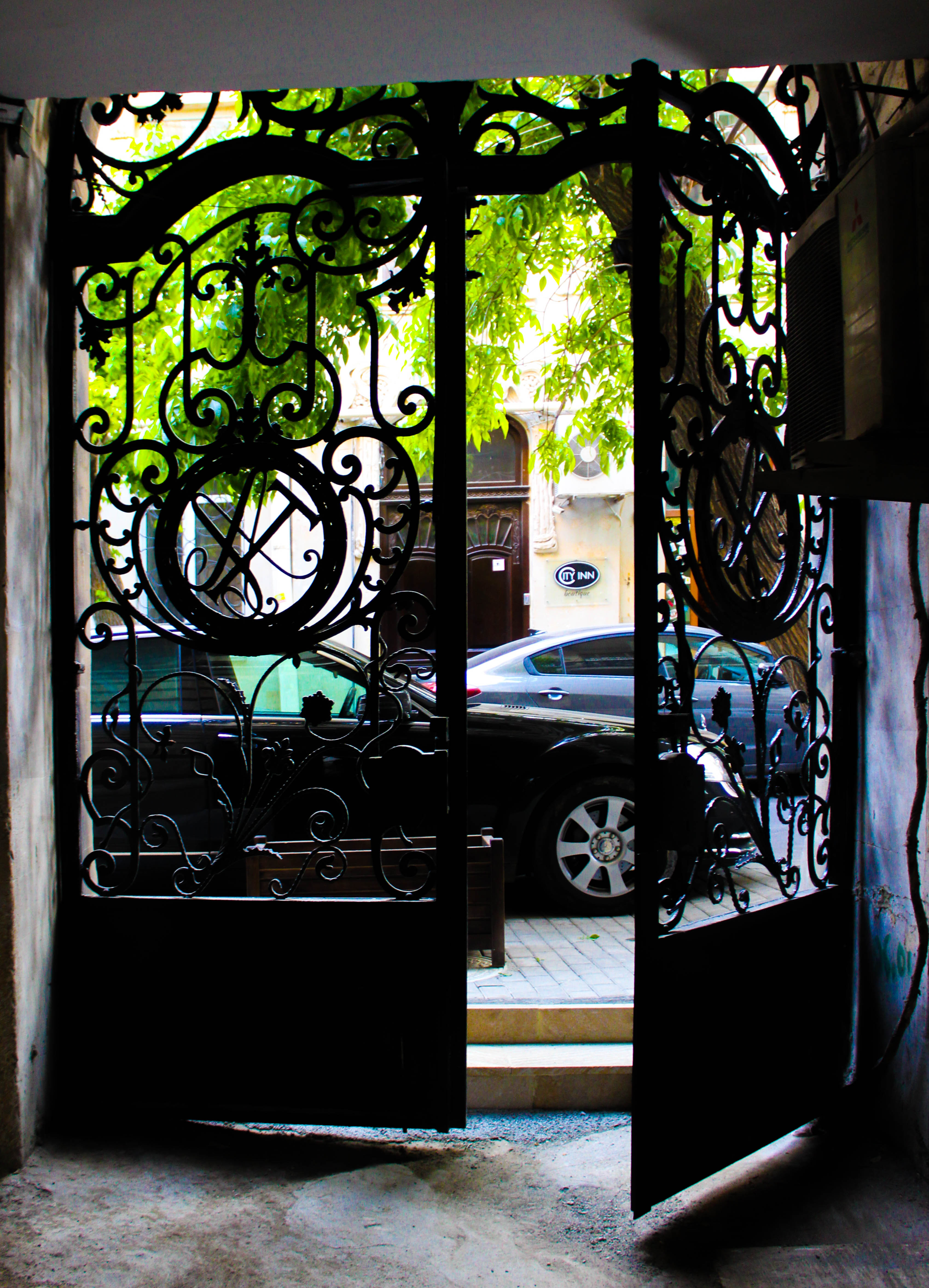

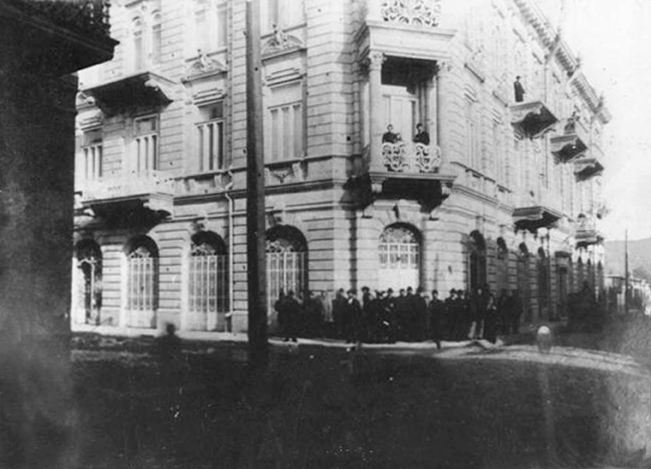

== See also ==
- Ismailiyya Palace
- House with Griffins
- Isa bek Hajinski House
