= Isa bey Ashurbeyov =

Azerbaijani oil industrialist (1878–1938)

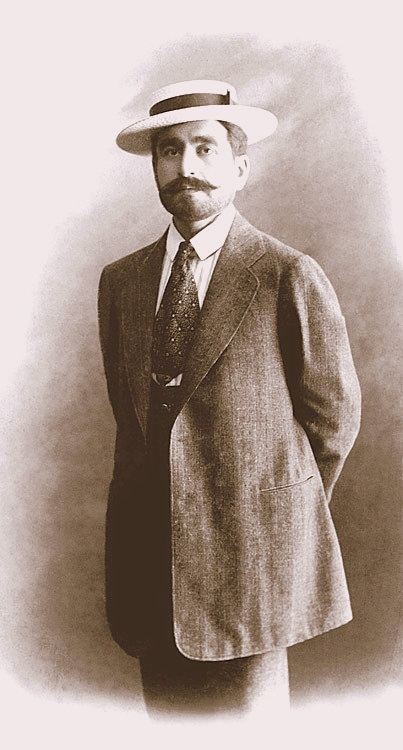
- Isa bey in early 20th century
- Born: 1878; Baku, Azerbaijan
- Died: 1938 (aged 59–60); Baku, USSR
- Parent: Haji Mehdi Gulu bey Ashurbeyov

Isa bey Ashurbeyov (Azerbaijani: İsa bəy Aşurbəyov; 1878, Baku – 1938, Baku) was a Baku oil industrialist and philanthropist, a representative of the Azerbaijani family of the Ashurbeyovs.

== Life ==
Isa bey Ashurbeyov was born in 1878. He was the only son of Haji Mehdi Gulu bey Ashurbeyov. And although the father, who got rich on the wave of the “oil boom”, did not spare money for the education of his son, he still tried, if possible, to protect Isa bey from external influences. Perhaps, precisely because of this, the desire for vigorous social activity over the years increasingly took possession of Isa bey. In his younger years, he was passionately fascinated by the ideas of the Social Democrats.

In 1912, Isa bey Ashurbekov entered the service Zeynalabdin Taghiyev in the printing and lithography of the well-known Baku newspaper “Kaspi”. The entry into the service, displeased his father and caused another quarrel with his relatives because as a nobleman his entry into the service had not accepted. Nevertheless, after two and a half years, with the financial support of Bala bey Ashurbeyov, Isa bey rents a printing house and, placing it in the basement of his house at the corner of Staro-Pochtovaya and Persian streets, organizes the publication of textbooks, methodological literature for teachers. One of the first Isa bey had published the works of M. A. Sabir and the weekly teacher's magazines "Shalala" (Waterfall) (in Russian and Azerbaijani), the satirical supplement "Baraban" (Drum). He financed the Irshad newspaper, which was published under the editorship of Ahmed bey Agayev. He was a member of the leadership of the Hummet organization. He was also a member of the board of the Nijat society.

Isa bey's public activities found their continuation in the Baku City Duma, of which he has been elected since 1910, as well as in the Baku Muslim Educational Society "Nijat", a society to struggle against child death. Their company called "A Drop of Milk".

He headed the publishing department under the Ministry of Education of the Democratic Republic of Azerbaijan. He was relieved of his post by the Bolsheviks in 1925.

He worked in Nakhchivan for a long time, and then worked at the Academy of Sciences of USSR because he knew Arabic and Persian. He was arrested on December 31, 1937 and shot by Bolsheviks.

== See also ==
- Ashurbeyov
