= Zabrat =

- Municipality
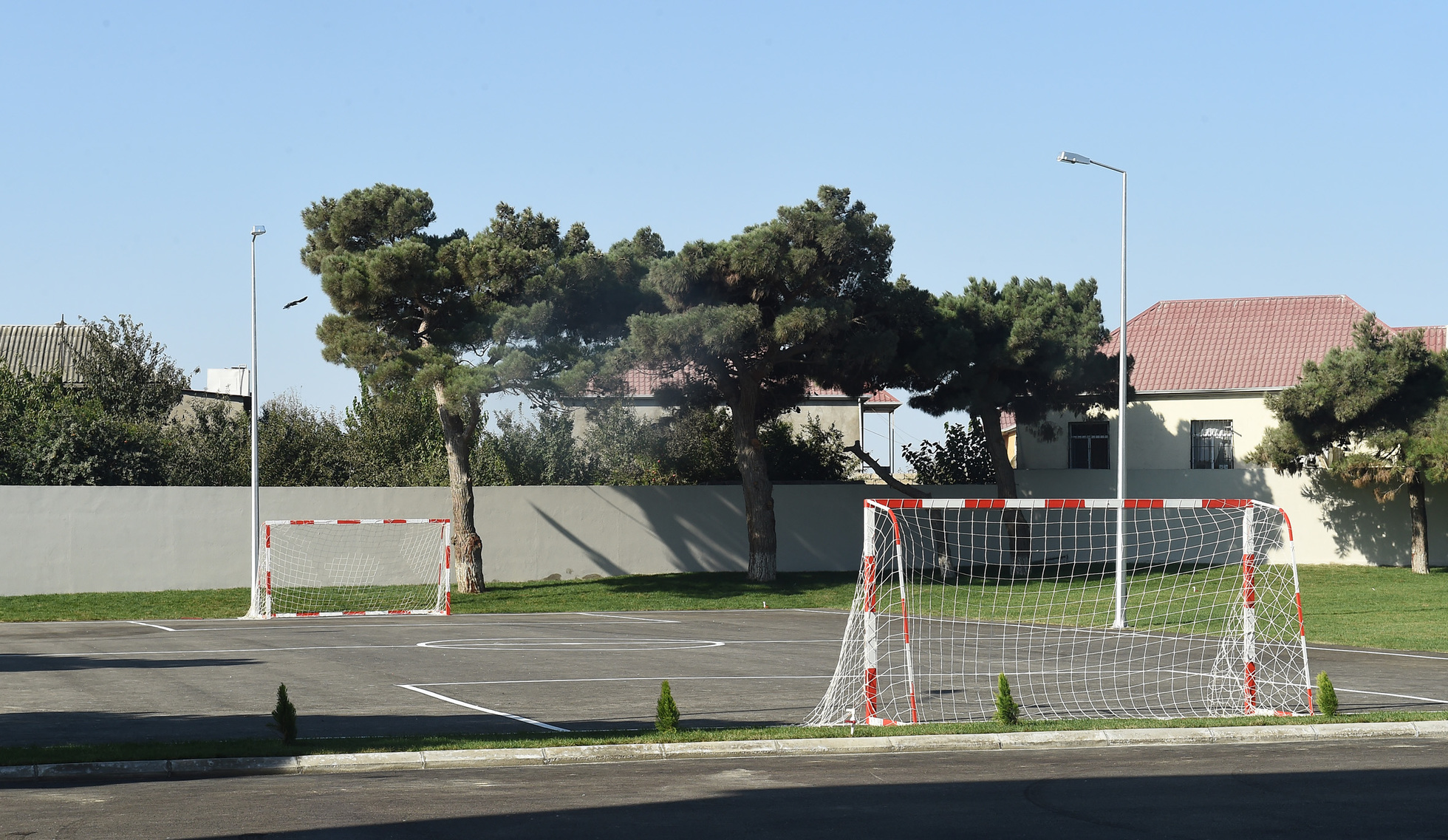

- Location within Azerbaijan
- Coordinates: 40°29′14″N 49°57′09″E
- Country: Azerbaijan
- City: Baku
- District: Sabunçu

Population (2008)
  - Total: 22,497
- Time zone: UTC+4 (AZT)
  - Summer (DST): UTC+5 (AZT)

Zabrat (also, Sabrat) is a settlement and municipality in Baku, Azerbaijan. It has a population of 22,497.

== Transportation ==
Baku suburban railway
