= Sara Ashurbeyli =

Azerbaijani historian, orientalist and scholar

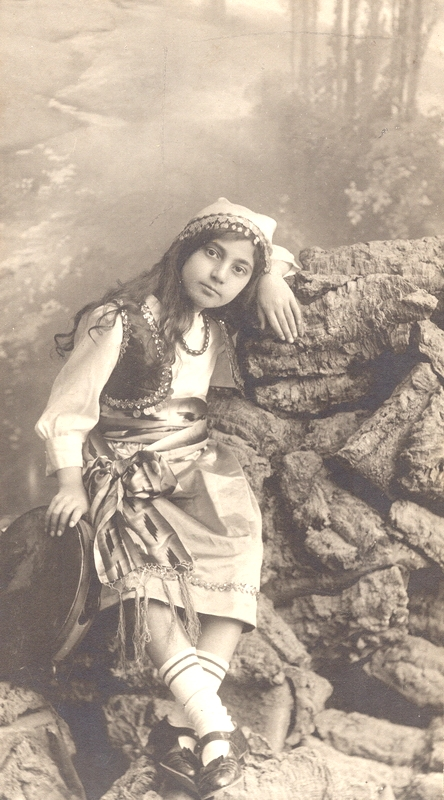
- Born: January 27, 1906; Baku, Baku uezd, Baku Governorate, Russian Empire
- Died: July 17, 2001 (aged 95); Baku, Azerbaijan
- Education: Azerbaijan State University
- Known for: Researcher of Shirvan and Medieval Baku History
- Awards: Shohrat Order; Order of Friendship of Peoples
- Scientific career
- Fields: Oriental studies, History
- Workplaces: Institute of History of Azerbaijan National Academy of Sciences

Sara Ashurbeyli, also known as Sara Balabey gyzy Ashurbeyli (Azerbaijani: Sara Balabəy qızı Aşurbəyli; 27 January 1906 – 17 July 2001) was an Azerbaijani historian, orientalist, and scholar. She was an expert on Baku's early and medieval history, and published several papers and books.

== Biography ==
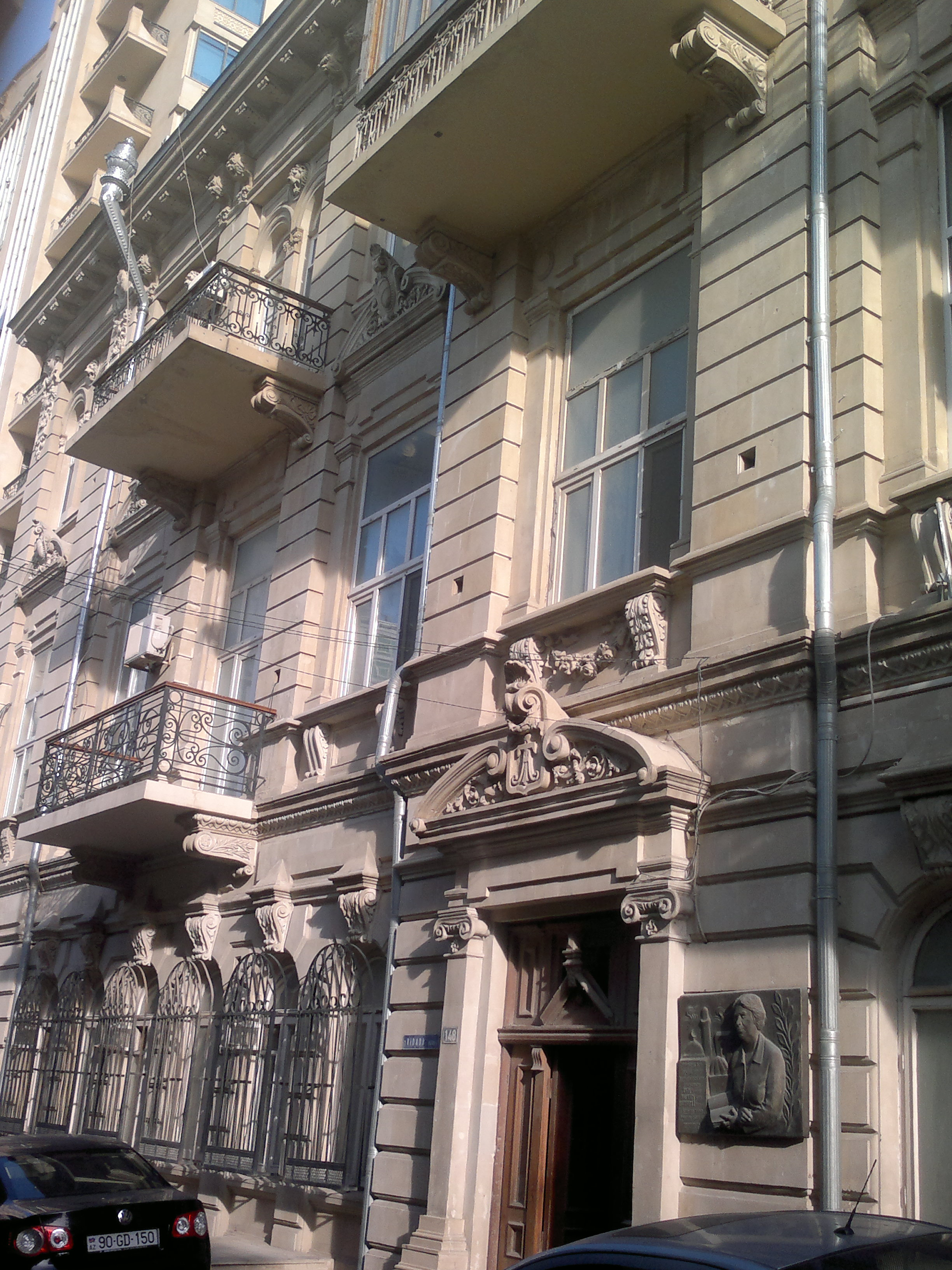
House in Baku, where Ashurbeyli lived

The daughter of an oil magnate, Sara Ashurbeyli was well educated; she finished Jeanne D’Arc College in Constantinople in 1925, and entered Baku State University in 1930, Azerbaijan having been a constituent republic of the Soviet Union at the time. She graduated as an orientalist; having also studied several European languages at the Azerbaijan Pedagogical Institute. As well as her native Azerbaijani, she knew Arabic, Persian, Turkish, French, German, Russian, and English.

Ashurbeyli was also an artist, and joined the Union of Azerbaijan's Artists in 1946. During her lifetime, she taught at various institutions and was a dean for a time. She got her Ph.D. in 1966. A Doctor of History Sciences, she was an Azerbaijan State prize laureate.

Her famous works include “History of Baku: Medieval Period” and “Shirvanshah State”. She had postulated that the name "Baku" has its origins in Zoroastrianism, taken from the word “baga” (meaning “the Sun” or “the God”) in several ancient middle-eastern languages.

She died in 2001 aged 95.
