= Sabunçu raion =

Sabunçu
- Raion
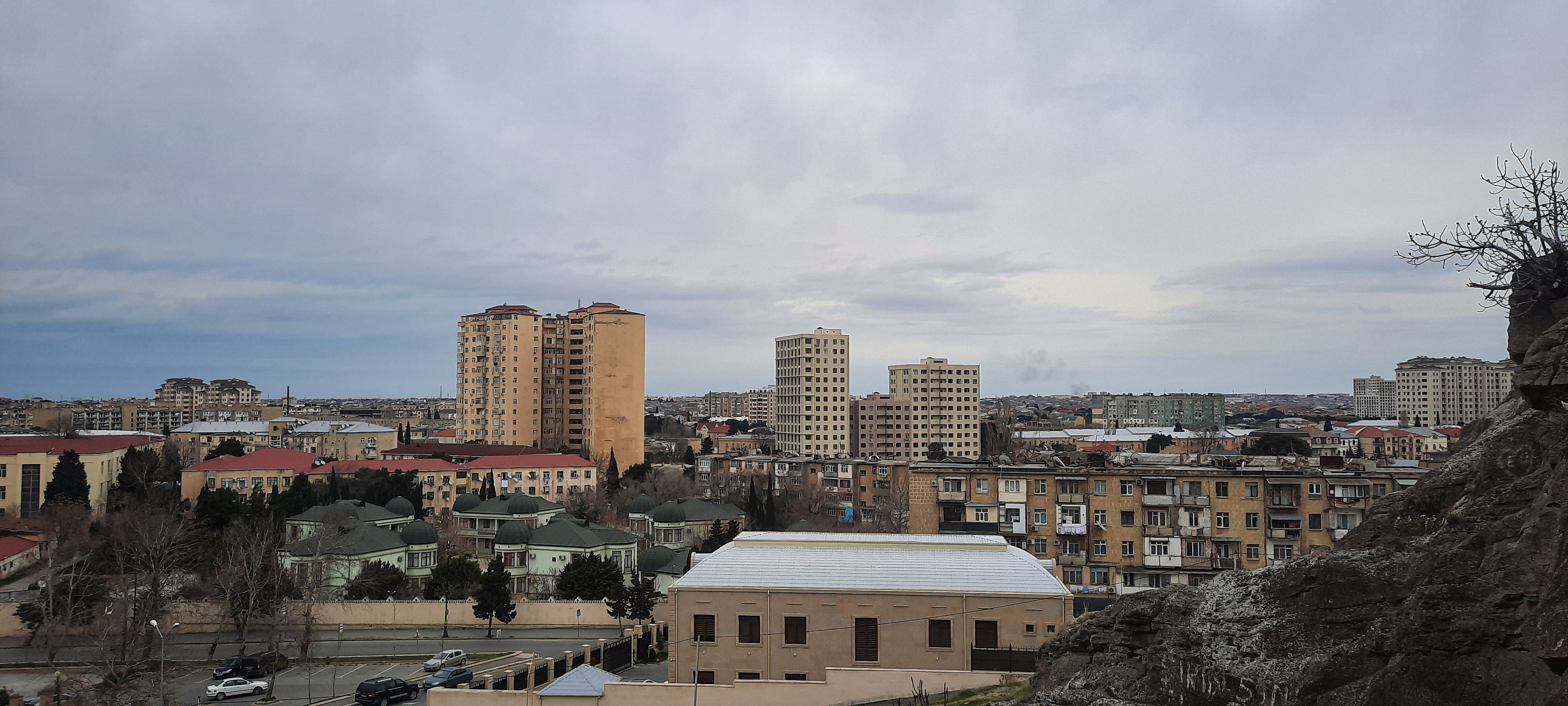
- View of Sabunçu

- Seal

- Location within Azerbaijan
- Coordinates: 40°26′N 49°57′E
- Country: Azerbaijan
- City: Baku

Population (2010)
  - Total: 222,600
- Time zone: UTC+4 (AZT)
  - Summer (DST): UTC+4 (AZT)
- Website: sabunchu-ih.gov.az

Sabunchu district (formerly: Lenin district) is a district of Baku city.

== Population ==
According to AzStat's official data as of January 1, 2013, 231,271 people live in the region.

== History ==
With the decision of the National Council of the Supreme Soviet of the Republic of Azerbaijan dated 29 April 1992 and numbered 112, Lenin district of Baku city was named Sabunçu district. In addition, Bakıhanov settlement, which is the center of Sabunçu district, received settlement status in 1936, Razin settlement was given its name, and in 1992 it was named Bakıhanov settlement.

== Municipalities ==
The district contains the municipalities of Bakıxanov, Balaxanı, Bilgəh, Kürdəxanı, Maştağa, Nardaran, Pirşağı, Ramanı, Sabunçu, and Zabrat.

== Transport ==
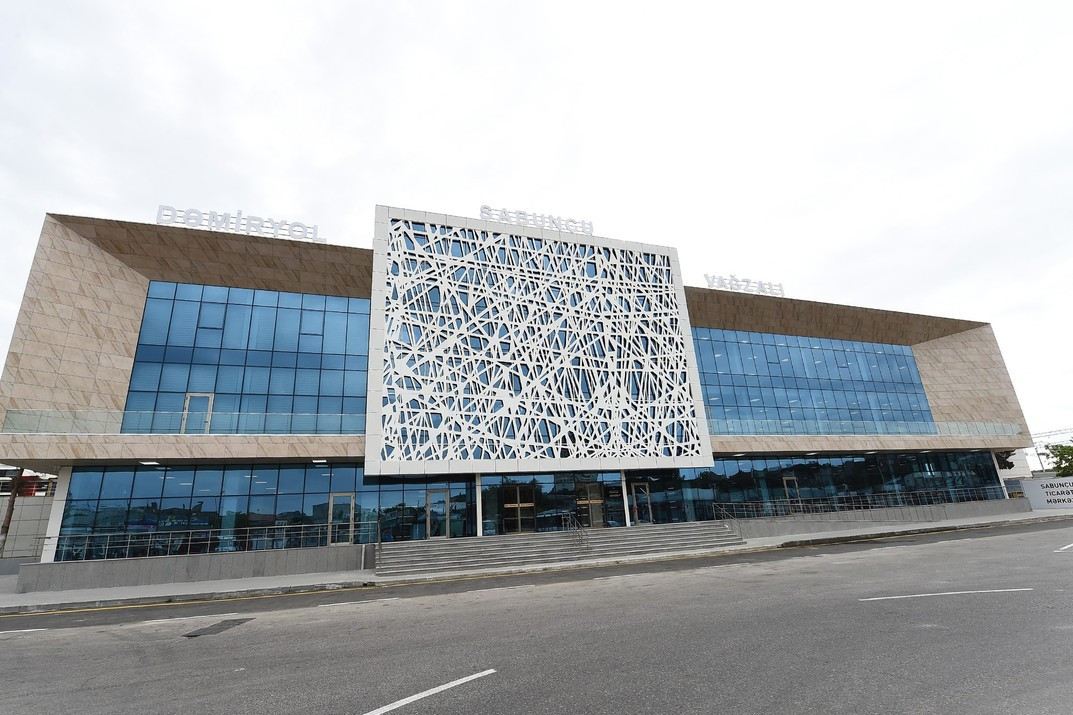
Sabunchu train station of Baku suburban railway

Baku Suburban Railway, Sabunchi station, is located in the area.

== Gallery ==
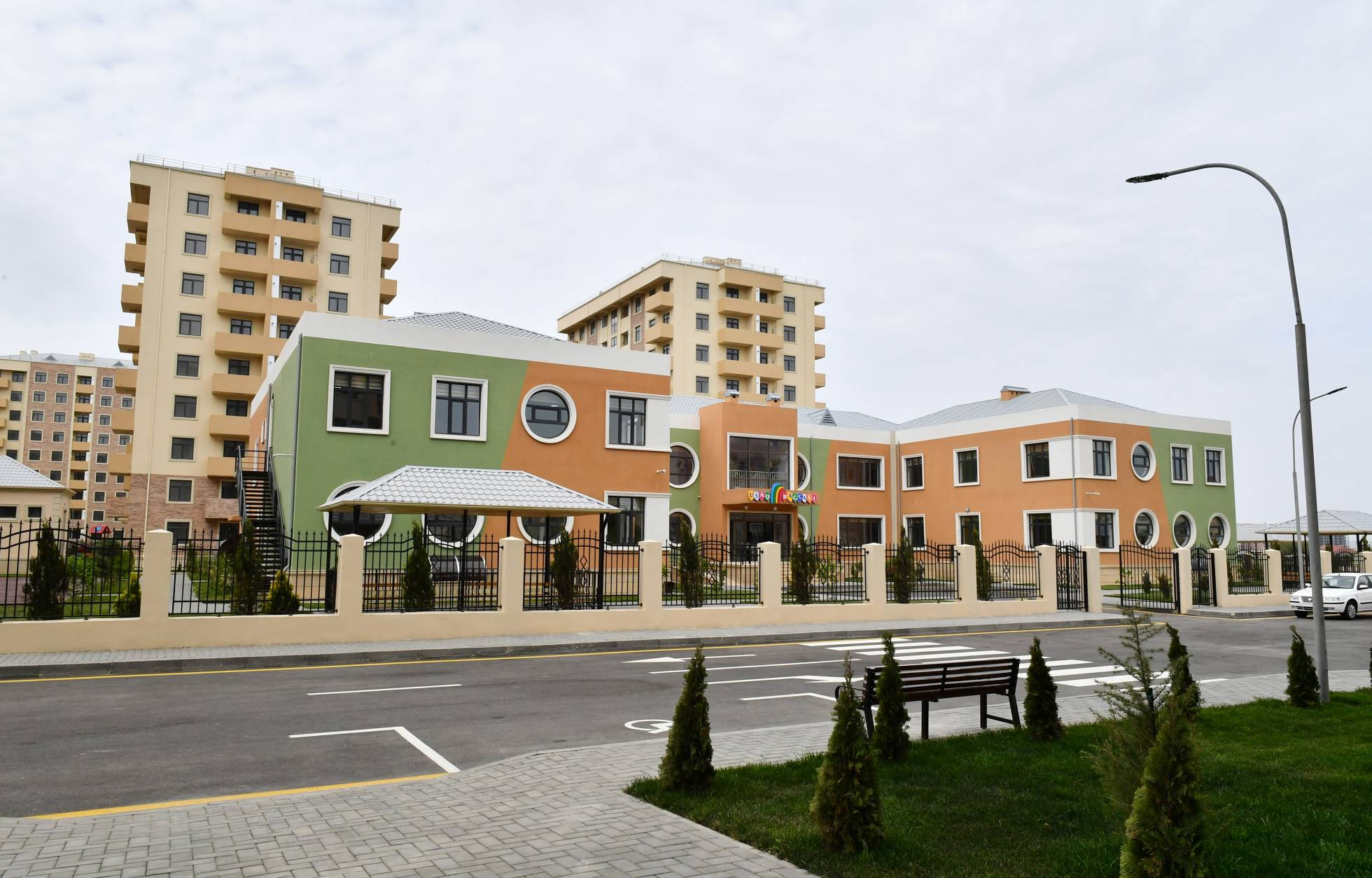
New residential complex for families of martyrs and war disabled in the Sabunchu district

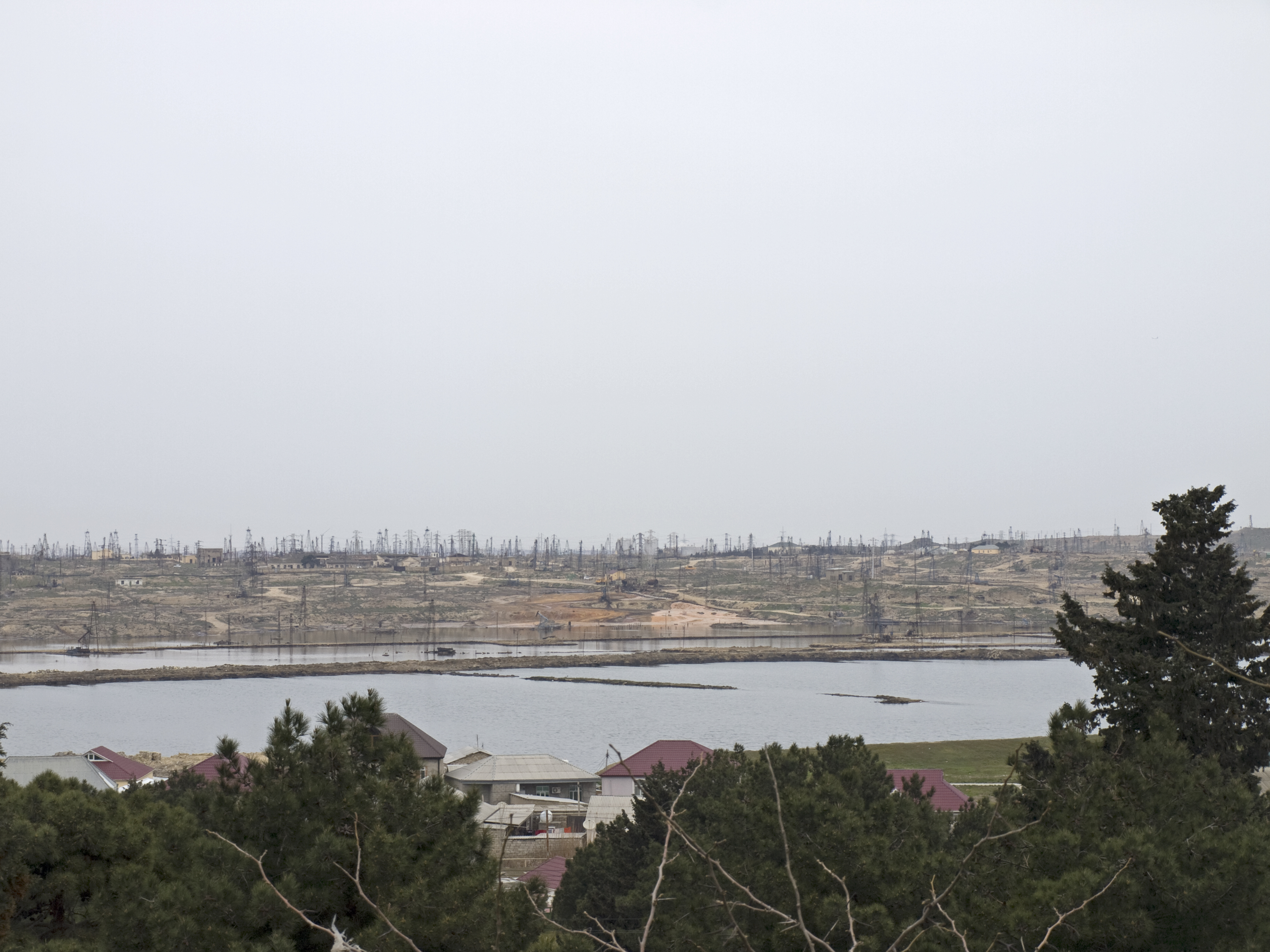
Oil fields in Sabunçu raion
