= Tarlan Aliyarbayov =

Soviet military officer

Major General Tarlan Aliyarbayov
- Tərlan Əliyarbəyov
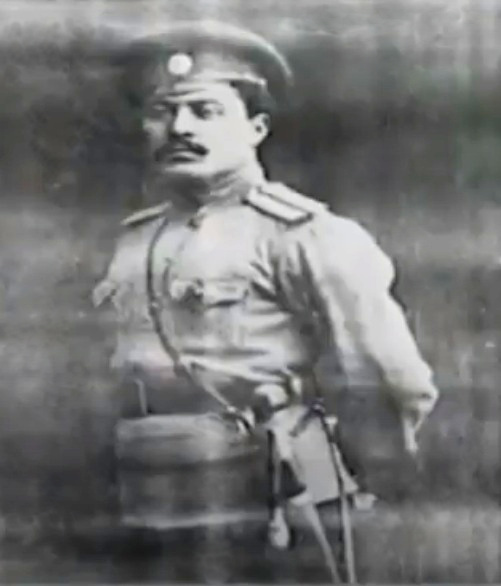
- Aliyarbayov during World War I
- Born: Tarlan bey Abdullah bey oglu Aliyarbayov; November 28, 1892; Aghsu, Shamakhi Uyezd, Baku Governorate, Caucasus Viceroyalty, Russian Empire
- Died: February 15, 1956 (aged 63); Baku, Azerbaijani SSR, Soviet Union
- Education: Mikhailovskoye Military School; M. V. Frunze Military Academy
- Spouse: Latifa Khanum Aliyarbayova
- Children: 2
- Military career
- Allegiance: Russian Empire (1914–1918); Azerbaijan (1918–1920); Soviet Union (1920–1948)
- Branch: Imperial Russian Army (1914–1918); Azerbaijani National Army (1918–1920); Soviet Army (1920–1948)
- Service years: 1914–1948
- Rank: Major General of the Soviet Union
- Nickname: Tarlan of Shamakhi
- Commands: 205th Shamakhi Infantry Regiment; 79th Rifle Reserve Regiment; 88th Rifle Reserve Regiment; 402nd Rifle Division; 416th Rifle Division
- Conflicts: World War I; Eastern Front; Brusilov offensive; Caucasus campaign; Russian Civil War; Armenian–Azerbaijani War; Red Army invasion of Azerbaijan; World War II; Eastern Front; Battle of the Caucasus; 1940–1944 insurgency in Chechnya
- Awards: Order of Saint Stanislaus; Order of Saint Anna; Order of the Red Star; Order of the Red Banner; Order of Lenin
- Other work: Deputy Minister of Education of the Azerbaijani SSR for Defence Affairs (1946–1949); Deputy of the Supreme Soviet of the Azerbaijani SSR (1947–1950)

Tarlan Abdullah oglu Aliyarbayov (Azerbaijani: ترلان عبدالله اوغلو الیاربیوو/Тәрлан Абдулла оғлу Әлијарбәјов/Tərlan Abdulla oğlu Əliyarbəyov; Russian: Тарлан Абдулла оглы Алиярбеков), also known as Tarlan bey Abdullah bey oglu Aliyarbeyov, (Note: His surname is sometimes spelled as Alyarbeyov (Azerbaijani: الیاربیوو/Әлјарбәјов/Əlyarbəyov; Russian: Алярбеков).) (Azerbaijani: ترلان بی عبدالله بی اوغلو الیاربیوو/Тәрлан бәј Абдулла бәј оғлу Әлијарбәјов/Tərlan bəy Abdulla bəy oğlu Əliyarbəyov) nicknamed the Tarlan of Shamakhi (Azerbaijani: شاماخی ترلانی/Шамахы Тәрланы/Şamaxı Tərlanı; 28 November [O.S. 16 November] 1892 – 15 February 1956), was a Soviet military officer who served as a major general in the Red Army, a military educator and a politician of Azerbaijani origin. He previously served in the Imperial Russian and Azerbaijani armies, and served in World War I, for which he was awarded the Order of Saint Stanislaus and the Order of Saint Anna, as well as the Russian Civil War and the Armenian–Azerbaijani War. Aliyarbayov was one of three Azerbaijanis who fought in both World Wars and the Russian Civil War; the others were Ali-Agha Shikhlinski and Samad bey Mehmandarov.

Aliyarbayov, who was characterised by his loyalty to the early Soviet government in Azerbaijan, was hailed as a capable educator and taught military science in schools and universities of the South Caucasus, and played an important role in the formation of local military units. He gained recognition during World War II, when he commanded the 402nd and 416th rifle divisions, and served as the deputy commander of the 58th Army Corps, for which he was awarded Order of the Red Banner, the Order of Lenin, and the Order of the Red Star. He concluded his military career in 1948, concentrating on his political career until he died in 1956.

== Early life ==
Tarlan Abdullah oglu Aliyarbayov was born on 28 November 1892 in Aghsu, which was then a village in the Shamakhi Uyezd of the Baku Governorate, in modern-day Azerbaijan, which was then part of the Russian Empire. He graduated from a six-year city school in Shamakhi in 1908, after which he left for Vladikavkaz to enter the cadet corps. The sudden death of his father Abdullah, however, changed his plans he was only able to enter Mikhailovskoye Military School in Tiflis in modern-day Georgia in 1910.

== Military career ==
=== World War I ===
In 1914, Aliyarbayov graduated from the Tiflis military school in 1st class. During World War I, Aliyarbayov served as a second lieutenant in the 205th Shamakhi Infantry Regiment of the 52nd Infantry Division in the Eastern Front. He later commanded a company and battalion of the regiment, fighting in several battles. Aliyarbayov was severely wounded during the mid-1916 Brusilov offensive; this was his fourth injury since the beginning of the war. He was sent to Brest for medical treatment, after which he left for Baku.

=== Azerbaijan ===
On 19 December 1918, as a captain, Aliyarbayov joined the national army formed by Musavat of the Azerbaijani Democratic Republic, serving as the captain of the 2nd Baku Infantry Regiment. Pushed back by the Red Army in Russia, the Russian Volunteer army led by Anton Denikin was scattered throughout the country. After capturing Derbent, the White Guardsmen, tried to invade Azerbaijan but were stopped by Aliyarbayov and his forces in Gusar. On 7 March 1919, by the decree of the Minister of War and the General of Artillery Samad bey Mehmandarov, Aliyarbayov was appointed as the acting assistant to the Baku District military commander. In this capacity, he led the military conscription of civilians in Baku and its surrounding districts into the Azerbaijani National Army. He continued to serve until the Red Army invasion of Azerbaijan in 1920.

=== Interwar years ===
In 1920, after the Red Army invasion of Azerbaijan and the establishment of Soviet power in the country, Aliyarbayov joined the newly formed Azerbaijani Red Army. In 1922, he served in the headquarters of the People's Commissariat for Military and Naval Affairs (Narkomvoenkomrat, NKVM) of the Azerbaijani SSR. From 1920 to 1922, Aliyarbayov led the local pro-Bolshevik forces in skirmishes with local golchomag insurgents near Shusha, Kurdamir, and Aghsu.

The second People's Commissar for Military and Naval Affairs of Azerbaijan Aliheydar Garayev and the acting chief of staff of the Azerbaijani Red Army Yusif bey Maghrubov noted Aliyarbayov, who held important posts from the first days of the Soviet power in Azerbaijan, "conscientiously performed the duties assigned to him, and was distinguished by his loyalty to the proletarian government". He worked in the organisation of the district military commissariats in the Azerbaijani SSR and oversaw the citywide mobilisation in Baku in 1920–21. From 1923 to 1929, Aliyarbayov served as an assistant to the military commissar of the Azerbaijani SSR and as the head of the Azerbaijani Territorial Administration. From 1925 to 1931, he was a candidate member of the Central Executive Committee of the Azerbaijani SSR.

==== Teaching career ====
In 1927, Aliyarbayov graduated from the Higher Command Courses at the M. V. Frunze Military Academy. From 1930 to 1938, he served in military schools of the South Caucasus, teaching military science at universities of the Azerbaijani SSR and training personnel for national military formations. Aliyarbayov, along with Mehmandarov and Shikhlinski, played an important role in the formation of local military units and the training of Soviet-Azerbaijani military officers. Aliyarbayov worked as a military training teacher at the Azerbaijan Oil Institute in 1932. The same year, the commander of the Azerbaijani Mountain Rifle Division, Divisional Commander Gambay Vezirov, stated of the 88 students taught by Aliyarbayov, 87 passed the exams for the rank of junior officer. Out of those, 22 were awarded the rank of deputy platoon commander and five petty officers, adding Aliyarbayov was "distinguished in the military field as a disciplined, capable and exemplary commander".

In 1934, Colonel Sluzhkov, who was seconded from the Transcaucasian Military District to monitor the teaching of military disciplines in the higher educational institutions of the Azerbaijani SSR, described Aliyarbayov, who was the head of courses at the Azerbaijani Agricultural Institute, as "a very valuable leader for a higher school" and a "good organiser", stating he had the "ability to clearly express his thoughts both in Russian and Azerbaijani".

=== World War Two ===
In 1941, Aliyarbayov, who was the acting head of the training department of the Telavi Rifle and Mortar School, graduated from the M. V. Frunze Military Academy. On 2 June 1942, during the Battle of the Caucasus, Aliyarbayov was appointed as the deputy commander and on 1 October the same year as the commander of the 416th Rifle Division. On 30 November, his forces engaged German troops and Chechen insurgents in Chechnya, and after two days broke the German defence lines to recapture Novo-Lednevo and Kapustino. Aliyarbayov's forces continued to push back the Germans, destroying large firing points. In late 1942, 350 km (220 miles) deep into the German lines, his forces recaptured dozens of towns and villages in the North Caucasus. Throughout 1943, he commanded the 79th and 88th Regiments, the 402nd Rifle Division, and was the deputy commander of the 58th Army Corps in 4th Army of the Transcaucasian Front. He retired from his military career in 1948.

== Later life and death ==
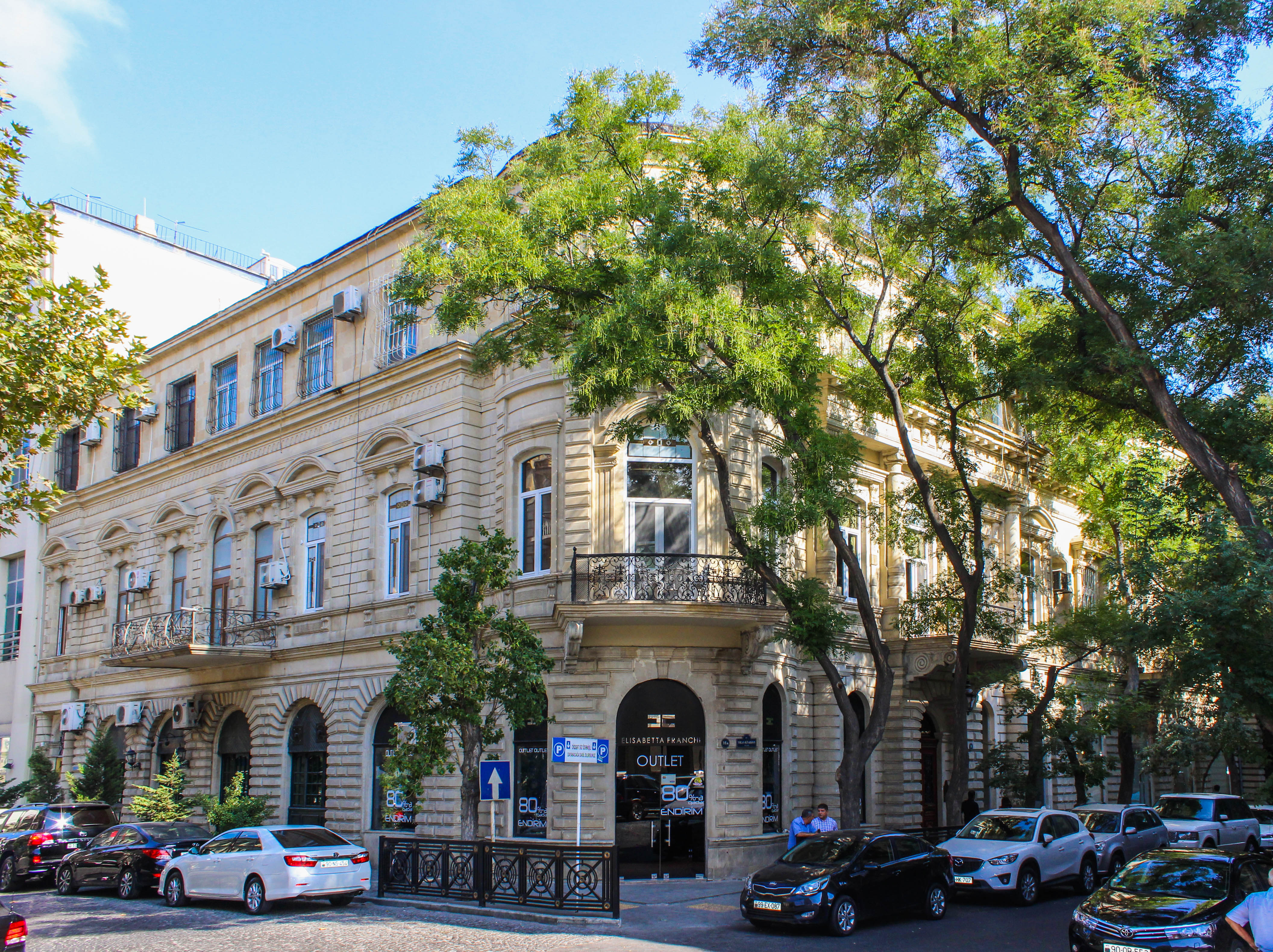
Tarlan Aliyarbekov Street in Baku, Azerbaijan

Tarlan Aliyarbayov served as the Deputy Minister of Education of the Azerbaijani SSR for Defence Affairs from 1946 to 1949. He was a deputy of the Supreme Soviet of the Azerbaijani SSR during the 2nd convocation. He died on 15 February 1956 in Baku, the capital of the Azerbaijani SSR

== Family and legacy ==
Tarlan Aliyarbayov was married to Latifa Khanum Aliyarbayova. The couple had two sons. Aliyarbayov's grandson is named after him, and graduated from the Baku Higher Combined Arms Command School in 1991 and became an officer serving in the Azerbaijani Armed Forces. Aliyarbayov's great-grandson Rovshan Rustamov also served in the Azerbaijani Armed Forces and was killed during the Second Nagorno-Karabakh War.

One of the central streets of Baku and one his native Shamakhi bear the name of Tarlan Aliyarbayov. A corner dedicated to Aliyarbayov was created in Shamakhi Museum of History and Ethnography.

== Awards ==
- Tarlan Aliyarbayov was promoted to a staff captain in 1914.
- Tarlan Aliyarbayov was awarded the Order of Saint Stanislaus third degree with swords and a bow in May 1916.
- Tarlan Aliyarbayov was awarded the Order of Saint Anna fourth degree, with the inscription For Bravery in May 1916.
- Tarlan Aliyarbayov was promoted to lieutenant colonel on 24 November 1919, by the decree of the Azerbaijani government.
- Tarlan Aliyarbayov, as the commander of the 79th Infantry Reserve Regiment, serving as a colonel, was awarded the Order of the Red Star on 8 August 1943, by the decree of the Supreme Soviet of the Soviet Union.
- Tarlan Aliyarbayov was promoted to major general on 9 February 1944, by the decree of the Supreme Soviet of the Soviet Union.
- Tarlan Aliyarbayov was awarded the Medal "For the Defence of the Caucasus" on 1 May 1944, by the decree of the Supreme Soviet of the Soviet Union.
- Tarlan Aliyarbayov was awarded the Order of the Red Banner on 3 November 1944, by the decree of the Supreme Soviet of the Soviet Union.
- Tarlan Aliyarbayov was awarded the Order of Lenin on 30 April 1945, by the decree of the Supreme Soviet of the Soviet Union.
- Tarlan Aliyarbayov was awarded the Medal "For the Victory over Germany in the Great Patriotic War 1941–1945" on 9 May 1945, by the decree of the Supreme Soviet of the Soviet Union.

== See also ==
- Amir Rustamov

== Sources ==
- Nazirli, Shamistan (24 December 2016). "Прославленный военачальник. Генерал-майор Тарлан бек Алиярбеков" [Renowned military leader. Major General Tarlan bey Aliyarbayov]. Kaspi (in Russian). pp. 20–21 – via Azerbaijani National Library.
- Nazirli, Shamistan (1991). Azərbaycan generalları [The Azerbaijani Generals] (PDF) (in Azerbaijani). Baku.
- Zapletin, G.; Shirinzadeh, G. (2008). Русские в истории Азербайджана (PDF) (in Russian). Baku: Ganun.
- Sergeyevna Amirkhanova-Kulish, Antonina; Hajimuradovich Zulfigarov, Zulfigar (1981). Помощь Красной Армии в социалистическом строительстве в Азербайджане [Assistance to the Red Army in socialist construction in Azerbaijan] (in Russian). Moscow: Nauka.
- Генералы Азербайджана. Каталог [Generals of Azerbaijan. Catalog] (in Russian). Baku: Azerbaijan National Academy of Sciences. 2005.
- Сборник приказов по военному ведомству Азербайджанской Демократической Республики [Collection of orders for the military department of the Azerbaijan Democratic Republic] (in Russian). Baku: Maarif. 2018.
- Asadzadeh, A., ed. (2011) [1920]. Адрес-календарь Азербайджанской Республики [Address-calendar of the Republic of Azerbaijan] (PDF) (in Russian). Naghyl Evi.
- "Әлјарбәјов Тәрлан Абдулла оғлу" [Alyarbayov Tarlan Abdulla oglu]. Azerbaijani Soviet Encyclopedia (in Azerbaijani). Vol. 4. Baku. 1980.
- "Əlyarbəyov Tərlan bəy Abdulla bəy oğlu" [Alyarbeyov Tarlan bey Abdulla bey oglu]. Encyclopedia of the Azerbaijan Democratic Republic (in Azerbaijani). Baku: Lider. 2004. Archived from the original on 30 January 2021.
- Khalili, Fariz (2009). Şamaxı Tarix-Diyarşünaslıq Muzeyi [Shamakhi History and Ethnography Museum]. Translated by Afandiyev, Ali. Shamakhi.
- Sarkisov, Ayro Aghajanovich (1975). Военный талант народа [Military talent of the people] (in Russian). Vol. 2. Azerbaijani Academy of Sciences. pp. 40–49.
