= Farrukh Gayibov =

Russian pilot of Azerbaijani ancestry

Farrukh agha Gayibov
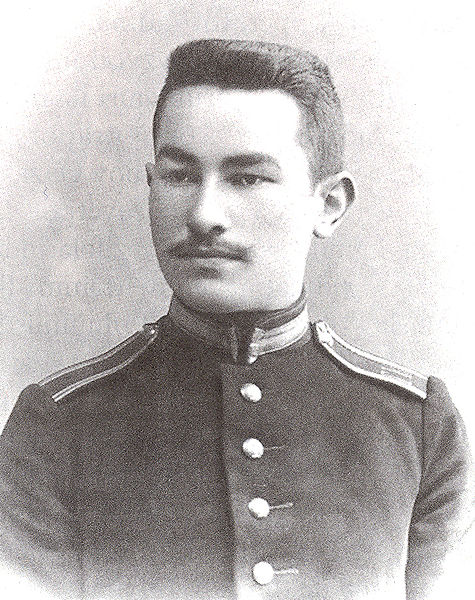
- Born: 2 October 1891; Yukhary Salahly, Kazakh Uyezd, Elisabethpol Governorate, Russian Empire
- Died: 12 September 1916 (aged 24); Baruny, Ashmyany district, Grodno Region, Belarus
- Relatives: Ali Agha Shikhlinski, Nigar Shikhlinskaya
- Military career
- Allegiance: Russian Empire
- Branch: Imperial Russian Air Force, Artillery
- Service years: 1913—1916
- Rank: Lieutenant
- Commands: 39th artillery brigade of the 1st Caucasian Army Corps, Airships' squadron of the Western Front
- Awards: Order of St. George, Order of St. Anna, Order of Saint Stanislaus

Farrukh agha Mammad Karim agha oghlu Gayibov (Azerbaijani: فرخ آقا محمد کریم آقا اوغلی غائبوف, Fərrux ağa Məmmədkərim ağa oğlu Qayıbov; 2 October 1891 – 12 September 1916) was a Russian pilot of Azerbaijani ancestry, and participant in World War I. He is considered to be the first Azerbaijani pilot.

== Childhood and youth ==
Farrukh's father, Mammad Karim agha, was a cadet in the 4th Muslim (Azerbaijanis) Life Guards of the Caucasian squadron of the Emperors own convoy, in the 1870s. After the completion of his military service, he was transferred to be a warrant officer of a militia. In subsequent years, Mammad Kerim agha worked as head of the court in Kazakhsky Uyezd of the Elisabethpol Governorate, a police officer at the Dzhevanshirsky Uyezd of Elisabethpol Governorate. On 30 August 1894 Mammad Kerim agha was awarded the Third Class Order of Saint Stanislaus for exceptional military service. His father died before his birth.

Farrukh agha Gayibov was born on 2 October 1891 in the Girag Salahly village of Kazakhsky Uyezd. He was raised by his uncle on his father's side, the prominent academic and public figure Samad agha Gayibov. Farukh agha studied five years at the Russian-Azerbaijan school in his native village, and then he continued his education at Tbilisi Cadet Corps, following Ali-Agha Shikhlinski's advice. After his graduation on 16 June 1910 with honors, he entered Konstantinovskiy Artillery School. He was distinguished for being observant, having courage, and skill with firing guns. There Farrukh agha was awarded a golden watch of the Swiss company "Pavel Bure". Graduating from Artillery School, he was commissioned a second lieutenant and was transferred to the second artillery battalion of the 39th artillery brigade of the 1st Caucasian Army Corps of Jelaus tract, where he was assigned as junior officer of the 4th battery.

== Participation in World War I ==
Farrukh agha took part in the Caucasus Campaign of World Was I. On 31 August 1915 he was promoted to first lieutenant. On 3 February 1916 Gayibov was sent to the Western Front and attached to the squadron of airships. On 21 May he was assigned as artillery officer of "Ilya Muromets № 16" airship, which had been built by I.I. Sikorsky in Saint Petersburg, a Russo-Balt factory.

On the eve of the war, Russia had the largest air fleet among the belligerents: 244 airplanes in 39 squadrons. By the beginning of the hostilities, there were 221 pilots, 170 officers, 35 lower rank officers and 16 volunteers in the Russian air fleet.

The logistics of the beginning of the war proved to be inefficient with petrol, castor oil, spares, tents and other aviation supplies. Airplanes routinely wrecked in the dry field circumstances, especially with bad weather, when there was scarcity of tents and moveable hangars, usage of areas of little avail for airdromes. After the first months of the war, many squadrons had to be taken back to home to be supplied with new equipment and retrained.

Gayibov was in combat fights on board the "Ilya Muromets № 16" airship, and raided enemy positions.

== Last Flight ==
On 12 September 1916 a raid was conducted under the command of Colonel Brant's General Staff, with an air squadron of two airplanes including the "Ilya Muromets", and 13 instruments. The aim of the raid was Baruny, 12 versts from the enemy front line, and the nearest district, where, according to reports, the staff of a German division was based, at the junction of a narrow-gauge railway, together with artillery and quartermaster's storehouses and airdrome.

Farrukh's squadron penetrated into Krevo and dropped 100-pound bombs, forcing the enemy to retreat.

Six days later, on 18 September 1916, The Petrogradskiye Izvestiya newspaper wrote: "General headquarters report that our airplanes invaded the enemy's rear in the Western front in Borun-Krevo district. Various posts were exploded by accurate bomb attacks, and storehouses of the enemy were set on fire. Transportation facilities, railway stations, and automobiles were also destroyed. Farrukh agha Gayibov and his team entered the battle with the enemy and destroyed four German airplanes. After destroying two Albatros airplanes, they fell into enemy's territory and perished".

== Awards ==
On 8 November 1915 Farrukh agha Gaibov was awarded the Third Class Order of Saint Stanislaus with swords and bow, and on 14 December, the Fourth Class Order of St. Anna with the "For Bravery" legend on it.

In 1916, he was awarded the Second Class Order of Saint Stanislaus with swords. On 26 January 1917 F. Gayibov was awarded the Second Class Order of St. Anna with swords (posthumously). On 14 March he was awarded the Third Class Order of St. Anna. On 25 March, as a lieutenant of 39th artillery brigade who died in air battle with his enemy, Farrukh agha Gayibov was posthumously awarded the Fourth Class Order of St. George.

== Memory of the hero ==
By tradition of pilots, a note had been thrown down from a German airplane and it is reported that Germans buried the crew of the airplane with military honours.

Recently, the cemetery of the fallen airplane crew was found in a German cemetery in Borun village. Apparently, Russian pilots were reburied in this cemetery in the 1930s, when the Polish government provided German military burials, with the participation of Germans. These words were written on gravestone cross in Polish: «4 NIEZNANYCH ROS.LOTN.25.16», which means: "4 unknown Russian pilots were buried 25.16". The date was written according to the European calendar. The month of burial was missing in the inscription, but it wasn't written on other gravestone crosses, either. There lay the heroes and pilots:

- Lieutenant Maksheev Dmitri Dmitriyevich;

- Lieutenant Rakhlin Mitrofan Alekseyevich;

- Lieutenant Gayibov Farrukh;

- Lieutenant Karpov Oleg Sergryevich.

In 1971, Pavel Kutakhov, the Chief Aviation Marshall, was elected as deputy of the Supreme Soviet of the Soviet Union from the Gazakh-Tovuz electoral district. After archival cross-referencing and adjustments, Pavel Kutakhov sent the hero to his motherland. He also arranged for the erection of a monument to the Mig-15 fighter, with a memorial plaque which read: "In memory of the first Azerbaijani pilot Farrukh agha Gayibov". Later, the inscription on the plaque was changed to: "In memory of those killed in the Great Patriotic War".
