= Vladas Mieželis =

Brigadier general Vladas Mieželis
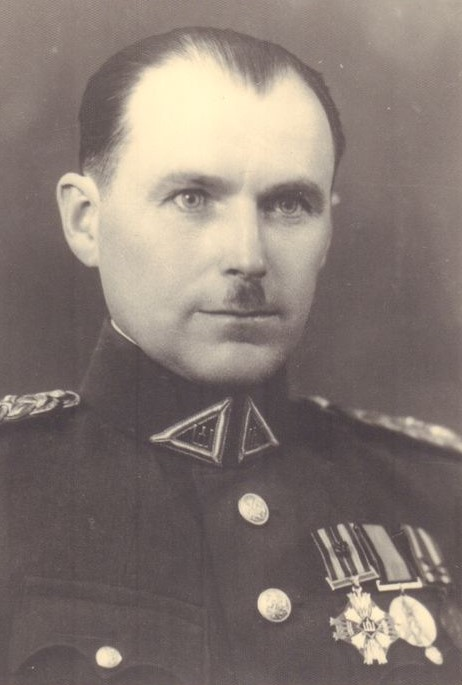
- Mieželis photographed with uniform of the Lithuanian Army and state awards
- Born: November 27, 1894; Jakštai, Daugailiai County, Russian Empire
- Died: June 4, 1986 (aged 91); Sun City, Arizona, United States
- Alma mater: Moscow University (1916), Moscow War School of Alexander II (1917), University of Lithuania (1926)
- Military career
- Allegiance: Imperial Russian Army (1916–1918); Red Army (1919–1921); Azerbaijani Red Army (1921); Lithuanian Armed Forces (1922–1940); Lithuanian Activist Front (1941)
- Service years: 1916–1941
- Rank: Brigadier general
- Awards: Medal of Independence of Lithuania (1928); Officer's Cross of the Order of the Lithuanian Grand Duke Gediminas (1928)
- Other work: Military judge of the Supreme Tribunal of Lithuania, Chairman of the Lithuanian Armed Forces Court

Vladas Mieželis (November 27, 1894 – June 4, 1986) was a Lithuanian brigadier general, lawyer, military judge of the Supreme Tribunal of Lithuania, and Chairman of the Lithuanian Armed Forces Court.

== Early years ==
Mieželis was born on November 27, 1894, in Jakštai, Daugailiai County, Russian Empire. His parents were farmers. He graduated from A. Lebedev's Private Gymnasium in Moscow.

In 1916 Mieželis began studying at Moscow University, but was mobilized into the Imperial Russian Army. In 1917 after graduating from Alexander II's War School in Moscow, he fought on the front. In 1918 he was demobilized and lived in Kyiv.

In 1919 he was mobilized as an officer into the Red Army. He served on the Southern and Caucasus fronts and in the Reserve Army. In 1921 he was an inspector of the Eleventh Army, Assistant Commander of the Territorial Brigade of the Azerbaijani Red Army. On June 6, 1921, he became ill with cholera.

== Interwar Lithuania ==
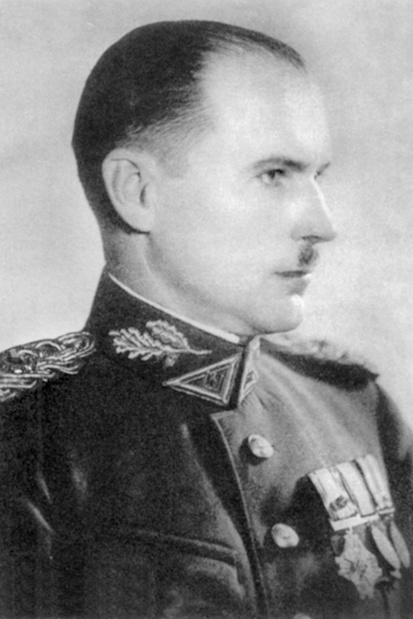
Mieželis with brigadier general uniform in the late 1930s

In November 1921 Mieželis illegally returned to Lithuania, and was mobilized into the Lithuanian Armed Forces in 1922. In 1922–23 he was Assistant Clerk of the Military Court, in 1923–26 – Clerk. In 1926 he graduated from the Faculty of Law of the University of Lithuania. In 1926–38 he worked in the Lithuanian Armed Forces Court.

In 1928–34 he lectured at the military school, in 1932–1936 – at the Higher Military School. In 1933–1938 he also was a military judge of the Supreme Tribunal of Lithuania (1933–36 – temporarily). In 1938 he was awarded the military rank of brigadier general. In 1938–1940 he was Chairman of the Lithuanian Armed Forces Court.

Mieželis contributed to the preparation of the military justice project. Moreover, he collaborated with journals Kardas, Mūsų žinynas, Teisė, and the Lithuanian Encyclopedia.

== Occupations and World War II ==
Following the Soviet occupation of Lithuania in June 1940, Mieželis was released into the reserve on June 6, 1940. He went into hiding to avoid political repressions.

In 1941 Mieželis was a participant of the June Uprising in Lithuania (worked at headquarters). During the German Nazis occupation of Lithuania in 1941, he was the representative of the Lithuanian Red Cross to assist the victims of the war, and in 1941–44 he was a judge of the Court of Appeal. He was engaged in the anti-Nazi resistance.

== Emigration ==
In 1944 he emigrated to Germany. In 1949 he moved to the United States and actively participated in the activities of the Lithuanian community in the United States.

== Legacy ==
In 1994 a memorial chapel for Mieželis was erected in Jakštai and a permanent exposition was set up in the Zarasai Regional Museum.
