= Ildyrymiyya =

Ildyrymmiye (Azerbaijani: İldırımiyyə) was an independent Muslim Labor Red Army, created by Azerbaijani Bolsheviks with the purpose of defending the future Bolshevik governments throughout Azerbaijan and Southern Russia during the political struggle for rule of Azerbaijan. The army name derived from the creator of the army, Azerbaijani Bolshevik Chingiz Ildyrym and was composed of peasants and workers. The first Ildyrymiyye was established in June 1918 in Petrograd and Şimal.

Once established, Ildyrymmiye army of 2,000 Azerbaijanis fought against the White Army in Astrakhan during the Russian Civil War but due to involvement of Armenian Dashnaks siding with Bolsheviks in massacres of Azerbaijanis during March Days of 1918, Bolsheviks lost their support among Azerbaijanis and the army soon dissolved.

== See also ==
- Chingiz Ildyrym
- March Days
- 11th Red Army
