= Azerbaijani Red Army =

Former field army

- Azerbaijani: Azərbaycan Qızıl Ordusu; Russian: Азербайджанская Красная армия
- Active: 1920–1922
- Country: Azerbaijan SSR
- Allegiance: Soviet Armed Forces
- Branch: Soviet Army
- Type: Field army
- Size: 36,000 (mid-1921); 10,000 (late-1921)
- Part of: Caucasian Front (until mid-1921)
- Garrison/HQ: Baku
- Colors: Red
- Engagements: Russian Civil War; Red Army invasion of Georgia
- Decorations: Order of the Red Banner

Commanders
- Notable commanders: Chingiz Ildyrym, Aliheydar Garayev, Ali-Agha Shikhlinski, Samad bey Mehmandarov

Azerbaijani Red Army (Azerbaijani: Azərbaycan Qızıl Ordusu; Russian: Азербайджанская Красная армия, abbreviated as AzKA), also known as the Red Army of Azerbaijan (Russian: Красная армия Азербайджана), was a field army of the pro-Bolshevik Red Army in the Azerbaijani Soviet Socialist Republic during the Russian Civil War.

== History ==
=== Initial developments ===
After the Red Army invasion of Azerbaijan in April 1920 and the following Sovietisation of Azerbaijan, the Azerbaijani Provisional Revolutionary Committee (Azrevcom) and Council of People's Commissars became the highest bodies of state power in the country. Azrevcom then proclaimed the Azerbaijani Socialist Soviet Republic, would later be known as the Azerbaijani Soviet Socialist Republic.

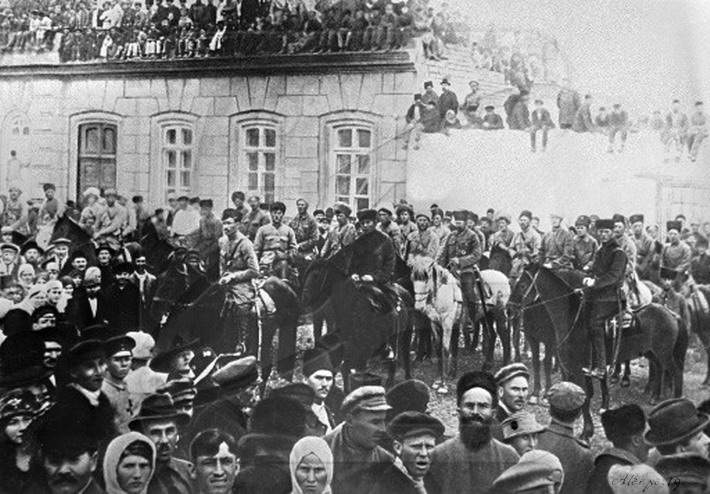
Red Army in Baku, the capital of Azerbaijan.

On 28 April 1920, the People's Commissariat for Military and Naval Affairs (Narkomvoenkomrat, NKVM) was established by the Azrevcom and Chingiz Ildyrym became the first People's Commissar for Military and Naval Affairs. On the same day, he issued a decree to declare the insignia of the Azerbaijani Democratic Republic (ADR) and establish new external signs for the Soviet Azerbaijani military.

The next day, by a new order from the military department, the Azerbaijani servicemen were to remove orders and other insignia, including those from cold steel. On the same day, Azrevcom issued a decree to subordinate the Azerbaijani National Army in operational terms to the command of the 11th Red Army, reorganising it on the "basis of the Workers 'and Peasants' Red Army into units corresponding to the numerical strength, preserving the name Azerbaijani. On 5 May 1920, NKVM established new insignia for the Azerbaijani servicemen.

On 4 May, the first issue of the press body of the Central Committee of the Azerbaijani Communist (Bolshevik) Party (AC(b)P), the first Red Army newspaper of the Azerbaijani SSR, Gyrmyzy Asgar (Qırmızı Əsgər, The Red Soldier), with Aliheydar Garayev as its editor-in-chief. In the first issue of the newspaper, it was indicated that it sets itself the task of explaining to the servicemen of the Red Army "their responsibilities to protect the Soviet Republic," and each Red Army serviceman was required not only to read it carefully, but also to write to it about his needs. In total, three issues of this newspaper were published, the last of which came out on 7 May 1920.

In terms of personnel, the new-established Azerbaijani Red Army at first, in fact, was an army inherited from the Azerbaijani National Army of the ADR. The soldiers and officers of the old army continued to serve, but under new regime. So, on 30 May, Ildrym temporarily appointed the former minister of war of the ADR, Ali-Agha Shikhlinski, as his deputy. As the commander of the 20th Rifle Division, Mikhail Velikanov, later noted, the previous military units did not "undergo radical reorganization, but continued to exist without any changes in the leadership and command lines" as the "revolutionary capabilities of this army were overestimated."

Members of the new AC(b)P began to get sent to the units of the old army, which were tasked with concentrating the political leadership in their hands. Ahmad Rzayev was appointed commissar of the troops that were located in Ganja, on the recommendation of the Azrevcom. On 4 May, the People's Commissar of the Azerbaijani SSR issued a decree to appoint Habib Jabiyev the commissar of the 6th Goychay Infantry Regiment. On 7 May, the Azrevcom issued a decree on the organization of the Azerbaijani Red Army (AzKA) and the Azerbaijani Red Fleet. It also issued to decree to subordinate the army that had been renamed by that time and fleet to the command of the 11th Red Army and Volga-Caspian Flotilla in the terms of operational, administrative, organizational manner. The subjugation of the old ADR units to the 11th Red Army was not only a political action. Replenishment of the composition of the units in the garrisons was deemed necessary, since the size of the 11th Red Army, which had entered the South Caucasus, was small in numbers.

In pursuance of this decision, on 11 May, a decree was issued by the commander of the 11th Red Army, Mikhail Levandovsky, the member of the Revolutionary Military Council (RMC), Konstantin Mekhonoshin, and chief of staff, Alexander Remezov to transfer the Azerbaijani troops stationed in Aresh, Zakatal and Nukha districts to the 2nd Cavalry Corps in operational and combat terms. In the meanwhile, the Azerbaijani servicemen in Ganja, Jebrail, Jevanshir, Kazakh, Shamkhor, and Shusha districts were transferred to the 32nd Division, while the Azerbaijani servicemen stationed in Baku, Lenkoran, and Shemahkha districts were transferred to the 28th Rifle Division, and the Azerbaijani servicemen stationed in Goychay, and Kuba districts were transferred to the 20th Penza Rifle Division. According to the same decree, the inspectors of the 11th Red Army were tasked with developing a plan for the reorganization of the Azerbaijani troops, and it was also ordered to form the Consolidated Azerbaijani Red Soviet Rifle Division.

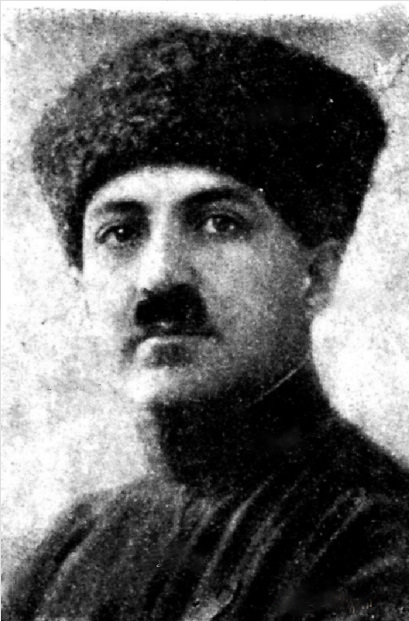
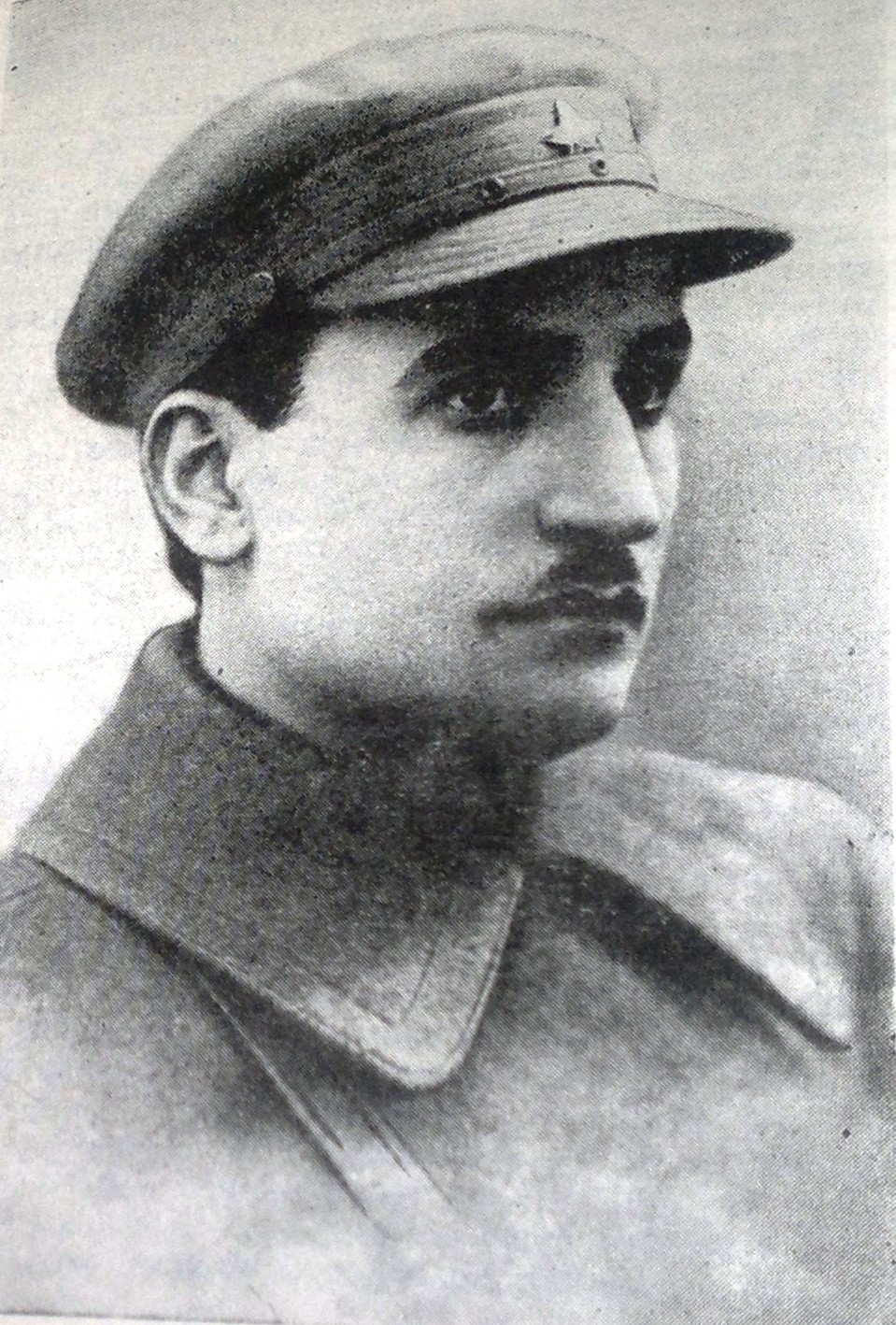
Chingiz Ildyrym and Aliheydar Garayev were the first and second People's Commissar for Military and Naval Affairs of Azerbaijan, respectively.

On the same day Ildrym wrote that the reorganization of the fleet would be carried out jointly with the commander of the Caspian Red Fleet. The mobilization and formation of units was carried out by the Naval Commissariat of the Azerbaijani Soviet Republic. On 16 May, the People's Commissariat for Military Affairs issued a decree, according to which the 1st Javanshir Infantry Regiment was renamed the 1st Azerbaijani Workers 'and Peasants' Rifle Regiment, 3rd Ganja Infantry Regiment was renamed the 3rd Azerbaijan Red Rifle Regiment. Per the same decree, the 1st Infantry Division was combined into the 1st and 2nd Red Rifle Brigade, which became part of the 1st Azerbaijani Red Division. The Consolidated Azerbaijani Red Soviet Rifle Division, formed on the basis of the 1st and 2nd infantry divisions and the cavalry division of the old army, comprised a rifle brigade, a cavalry brigade, and a light artillery division. The headquarters of the 1st Infantry Division was named the headquarters of the Consolidated Azerbaijani Red Soviet Rifle Division, and the headquarters of the 2nd Infantry Division was reorganized into the headquarters of the rifle brigade.

At about the same time, by the decree of the NKVM, the Azerbaijani Military School was renamed the Red Command Courses. Manual reorganization of educational participation was assigned to Shikhlinski. In accordance with the decree of the NKVM, on 17 May, the replenishment and formation of army units was carried out on a volunteer basis.

=== Creation of the army ===
The development of the Soviet Azerbaijani Armed Forces was changed after the Ganja Uprising of May 1920, when the still unreorganized units of the 1st Infantry Division of the former ADR raised an uprising. The RMC of the 11th Red Army was tasked to suppress the uprising. According to the Bolshevik leadership, the development of an army in Azerbaijan was a controversial issue and the Bolshevik army was tasked with the suppression of counter-revolutionary organizations in the country.

The Azerbaijani Bolsheviks came under suspicion of the Bolshevik regime for their closeness to the rebels. After the suppression of the uprising, the RMC was able to afford purging them. Ultimately, the Azerbaijani army, together with all its institutions, was disbanded at the request of the RMC. The exceptions were volunteers rifle and cavalry units, including the 2nd Karabakh Cavalry Regiment, the 5th Baku Infantry Regiment, the Baku Fortress Battalion and a number of other units. Guard units were reorganized as well. The class criterion had a role in the selection of personnel. Admission of volunteers was done only on the recommendation of the Communist Party, and the probationary period was six months. The Bolshevik military authorities was to be "guided exclusively by revolutionary consciousness" when selecting commanders, and were tasked not to be "ashamed of appointing soldiers to the highest command positions" and not to accept the people from the bey and khan families.

Aliheydar Garayev then replaced Chingiz Ildyrym as the People's Commissar for Military and Naval Affairs. The central office of the NKVM also had to change its personnel. Garayev, who played an important role in the creation of the Azerbaijani Red Army, began to lead the state body. In accordance to a decree issued by Garayev, on 19 June, the formation of the first military units of the Soviet Azerbaijan began, including Lenin's International Azerbaijani Regiment and the Red East Rifle Regiment. On 21 June 1920, Azrevcom appointed Garayev the new People's Commissar for Military and Naval Affairs. He was a member of the RMC of the 11th Red Army and the Caspian Flotilla, and was directly involved in military activities. In May 1921, he became a member of the RMC of the Red Banner Caucasus Army. The activities of the People's Commissariat for Military Commissariat continued to concern the accounting and distribution of people liable for military service, and the establishment of units and formations.

In mid-June, the formation of the Consolidated Azerbaijani Red Soviet Rifle Division, 5 rifle brigades, 2 rifle regiments, cavalry brigades, several artillery divisions, technical troops and a reserve artillery battery began. The composition of the unit was arranged as follows:

- The 1st Brigade, comprising the 1st and 2nd Rifle Regiments, was fully concentrated in Baku. Its headquarters and regional headquarters were also located there.
- The 2nd Brigade, headquartered in Aghdam, comprising the 3rd (Karyagino) and 4th (Aghdam) rifle regiments.
- The 3rd Brigade, headquartered in Kazakh, comprising the 5th and 6th rifle regiments (Kazakh), and the 7th Rifle Regiment (Ganja).
- The 4th Brigade, headquartered in Shamakhi (Lankaran in other sources), comprising the 8th (Shamakhi) and 9th (Lankaran) rifle regiments.
- The 5th Brigade, headquartered in Hadrut (Karabakh), comprising the 10th Rifle Regiment and the 3rd Cavalry Regiment.
- The cavalry brigade was headquartered in Lankaran, while the artillery and technical units were mainly located in Baku and Ganja respectively.

However, in fact, not all parts of the unit were formed. This was influenced by the still-existing, voluntary principle of deployment of troops and specialists, as well as the deployment of troops, which led to a shortage of ordinary soldiers. By mid-July 1920, the size of the Azerbaijani Red Army was a little over 5,500 servicemen.

On 17 August, Azrevcom issued its first decree on mobilization into the Red Army, according to which all citizens born in 1898–1902 inclusive, living in Baku District, were subject to conscription. The day of the beginning of mobilization was set on 25 August, and the conscription had to be completed within ten days. The Extraordinary Military Mobilization Commission formed for this purpose began to engage in political work among the population. According to the results of the mobilization, 3,274 people from among those liable for military service at the Baku Provincial Military Commissariat came to the recruiting offices, of which 2,670 people entered active military service. Among the persons mobilized in Baku and Baku District, 2 thousand people were sent to the Consolidated Azerbaijani Red Soviet Rifle Division for replenishment, which allowed completing its formation.

On 30 September, an agreement on the military-economic union between the Azerbaijani SSR and the Russian SFSR was signed in Moscow, and in addition to it, the parties concluded several agreements. In accordance with the provisions of the document concluded by both republics, the Azerbaijani SSR retained the AzKA and its own navy. The number and armament of AzKA were determined by one fully equipped division. As for the number of ships and the armament of the fleet, a special agreement was provided for this. The construction of a system of bodies of military-administrative management was connected with the People's Commissariat for Military Affairs of Azerbaijan, provincial and district military registration and enlistment offices. According to the same normative legal act of the RMC of the Caucasian Front for the period of hostilities, the army and republican bodies of military-administrative control were subordinate to the Russian Red Army. The commander of the RSFSR naval forces at the same time became the Commander of the Azerbaijani fleet. The appointment and removal of that post was administrated by the RMC of the Russian SFSR. Per the agreement, if the citizens of the Russian SFSR, present in the AzKA and AzVMF, were considered as carrying the Azerbaijani service and they could be recalled at any time, then the consent of the Azerbaijani government should be obtained to dismiss the Azerbaijani military personnel. The People's Commissariat for Military Affairs of the Azerbaijani SSR was assigned the right to establish the uniform of servicemen of the AzKA and AzVMF. After the dissolution of the Caucasian Front, further relations between the Azerbaijani and Russian armed forces was planned to be determined by a subsequent agreement.

In November 1920, the division, which was in the stage of formation, was reorganized into a Separate Consolidated Azerbaijani Brigade, headquartered in Baku. It consisted of the 1st, 2nd and 3rd rifle regiments, headquartered Sabunchu, Surakhani, and Bibi-Heybat respectively, a separate cavalry regiment, a sapper company, a communications company, and a training battalion. In June 1922, the Separate Consolidated Azerbaijani Brigade was again deployed into a division consisting of three rifle regiments, a separate cavalry squadron, a light artillery battalion, a consolidated artillery park, an artillery school of junior command personnel, an automobile detachment, a reconnaissance air squadron, and other logistical support units.

== Size ==
In mid-July 1920, the Azerbaijani Red Army was composed of 5,500 servicemen. On 17 August of the same year, Azrevcom issued a decree, signed by Aliheydar Garayev and Nariman Narimanov, on mobilizing citizens to replenish the army. In May 1921, there were 36 thousand people in the ranks of the Azerbaijani Red Army, but by the end of the year its composition was reduced to ten thousand.

In August 1922, Bakinsky Rabochi, a Bolshevik newspaper based in Baku, published the memoirs of the then chairman of the Central Executive Committee of the Azerbaijani SSR Samad aga Agamalioglu in two issues. According to these memoirs, during his trip to Moscow, he managed to arrange a meeting with Vladimir Lenin, who at that time was very ill, as in May 1922, he had his first stroke. During the meeting, Lenin inquired about the size of the Azerbaijani Red Army, and Agamalioglu, as he did not remembered the exact number, gave an approximate figure. However, Agamalioglu explained that it was very difficult to create a large proletarian army in a poor country like Azerbaijan.

== Training ==
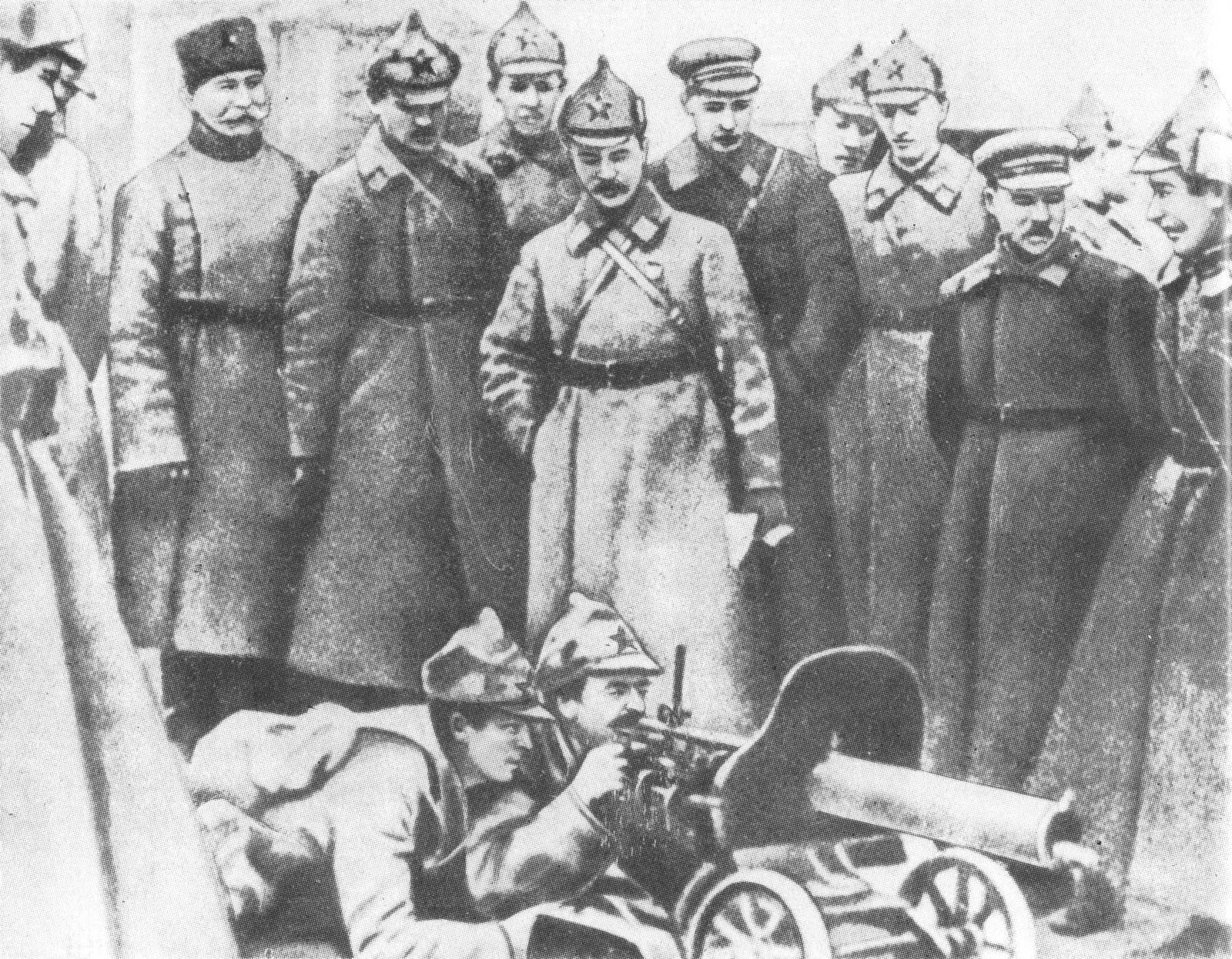
Bolshevik officers at a combat training of the Azerbaijani servicemen of the Red Army in April 1924. From left to right: Ali-Agha Shikhlinski, M. Veisov, Mikhail Frunze, and Aliheydar Garayev.

Aviation and military-sports schools, military-political courses were opened in Baku under the leadership of Aliheydar Garayev. According to the Bolshevik military authorities in Azerbaijan, the cadets had to learn, first of all, how to shoot, use bayonet and grenade, adapt to the terrain, use a shovel, find cover, and get acquainted with their main duties on and off duty. For the team of officers in training, "mastering the instructions from the field manual and understanding the existing examples of the civil war" was considered a priority.

On 19 August 1922, the Red Command Courses changed their name to the Azerbaijani Soviet Combined Military School, and on 14 March, to the Azerbaijani Combined Military School. By the early 1922, the school had graduated about 300 officers.

The People's Commissariat for Military and Naval Affairs of the Azerbaijani SSR faced certain difficulties while forming the national command staff. In 1921, Garayev decided to enlist the former officers of the Imperial Russian Army and the Azerbaijani National Army, Ali-Agha Shikhlinski and Samad bey Mehmandarov to the Red Army. The Bolshevik government of Azerbaijan, in turn, raised the issue of these officers serving in the army to the Soviet authorities. With a special telegram from Sergo Ordzhonikidze, these two officers were sent to the order of the People's Commissariat for Military Affairs of Azerbaijan. Shikhlinski and Mehmandarov were enlisted in the headquarters of the Azerbaijani Red Army, and on 1 December, Shikhlinski was tasked with performing special assignments under the People's Commissar of Azerbaijan, and was appointed artillery teacher at the Azerbaijani Combined Military School. The former Deputy People's Commissar for Military Affairs, a former lieutenant general of the Red Army, Alexander Todorsky, later described Shikhlinski and Mehmandarov as the two key military specialists serving in Azerbaijan.

In order to prepare the children of the poor populace and the soldiers serving in the Azerbaijani Red Army for admission to the Azerbaijani Combined Military School, the 1st Azerbaijan Red Cadet Corps was established in October 1922, and the 2nd Azerbaijan Red Cadet Corps was established in May of the same year. In September of the same year, both establishments became known as the 1st and 2nd Azerbaijani proletarian military schools.

== Awards ==
On 5 May 1922, by the decree of the Second All-Azerbaijani Congress of the Soviets of the Workers, the Peasants, the Red Army and the Sailors' Deputies, the Azerbaijani Red Army was awarded the Order of the Red Banner.

== Sources ==
- Stepanov, Alexey B. (2008). "Азербайджанская Красная Армия. 1920—1924". Старый Цейхгауз (in Russian). 1 (25).
- История государства и права Азербайджанской ССР (1920 — 1934 гг.) (in Russian). Baku: Elm. 1973. pp. 20–21.
- Katibli, M. (1964). Чингиз Ильдрым (биографический очерк) (in Russian). Baku: Azerbaijan State Publishing House (Azgosizd).
- Интернациональная помощь XI Армии в борьбе за победу Советской власти в Азербайджане. Документы и материалы 1920-1921 гг (in Russian). Baku: Azerbaijan State Publishing House (Azgosizd). 1989.
- Ibrahimov, S. (1975). Генерал Али Ага Шихлинский (in Russian). Baku: Azerbaijan State Publishing House (Azgosizd).
- Декреты Азревкома (in Russian). Baku: Azerneshr. 1988.
- Воспоминания азербайджанских коммунистов о В. И. Ленине (in Russian). Baku: Azerneshr. 1958.
- Письма трудящихся Азербайджана В. И. Ленину 1920 — 1924 гг (in Russian). Baku: Elm. 1962.
- Bezugolniy, A. Y. (2007). Народы Кавказа и Красная армия. 1918—1945 годы (in Russian). Moscow: Veche.
- Darabadi, P. G. (2013). Военно-политическая история Азербайджана (1917—1920 годы) (in Russian). Baku: Caucasus Publishing House.
- Huseynov, A. (1976). Алигейдар Караев (биографический очерк) (in Russian). Baku: Azerbaijan State Publishing House (Azgosizd).
- Zeynalov, R. (1990). Военное строительство — военно-патриотическая и оборонно-массовая работа в Азербайджанской ССР в период строительства социализма (1920—июнь 1941 г.) (in Russian). Baku: Elm.
- Steklov, A. (1928). Красная армия Азербайджана (in Russian). Baku: Azgiz.
- Amirkhanova-Kulish, A .S.; Zulpukarov, Z. G. (1981). Помощь Красной Армии в социалистическом строительстве в Азербайджане (in Russian). Moscow: Nauka.
