= Fatimeyi-Zahra Mosque (Mingachevir) =

Mosque in Central Aran, Azerbaijan

- Azerbaijani: Fatimeyi-Zəhra məscidi (Mingəçevir)

Religion
- Affiliation: Islam
- Region: Mingachevir
- Status: Active

Location
- Location: 13 Ali Agha Shikhlinski Street, Mingachevir
- Country: Azerbaijan
- Interactive map of Fatimeyi-Zahra Mosque (Mingachevir)

Architecture
- Type: Mosque
- Established: 2006

Specifications
- Capacity: 200+
- Interior area: 208 m²
- Dome: 1
- Minaret: 2

Fatimeyi-Zahra Mosque (Azerbaijani: Fatimeyi-Zəhra məscidi (Mingəçevir)) of the City of Mingachevir is a mosque located on Ali Agha Shikhlinski Street in the city of Mingachevir, Azerbaijan.

The mosque is also known as the Right Bank Mosque.

== History ==
The Fatimayi-Zahra Mosque was constructed in 2006 at the initiative of the residents of the city. The "Zahra" Mosque Religious Community of the City of Mingachevir, which is officially registered with the State Committee for Work with Religious Organizations, operates at the mosque.

== Architecture ==
The mosque has a rectangular floor plan and consists of two storeys. The prayer hall has an area of 208 m² and provides the necessary facilities for more than 200 worshippers to perform prayers simultaneously. The mosque has one minaret, measuring 30 metres in height, and one dome. The dome contains several skylights that provide natural illumination. The façade of the building features several windows and two entrance doors. The entrance section was designed in the form of a portico supported by five stone columns.
