= Baruny verses =

18th-century Belarusian literary work

Baruny verses (Belarusian: Барунскія вершы), also known as Baruny festive monologues (Belarusian: Барунскія святочныя маналогі), are a collection of Belarusian poems from the mid-18th century. They were discovered in a manuscript from the Basilian monastery in Baruny (near Ashmyany, modern Belarus).

== History and discovery ==
The manuscript containing the verses was preserved by the Basilian monk Nikadzim Hrynievič, though the specific scribe who wrote down the verses is unknown. The texts were identified and published in 2020 by the Belarusian translator and researcher Anton Franciszak Bryl, with contributions from historians Dzianis Lisiejčykaŭ and Viačaslaŭ Martysiuk.

The verses are dated to 1751–1752 based on Cyrillic numerals found in the manuscript (҂аѱна, ҂аѱнв).

== Content and context ==
The texts consist of comic monologues intended to be spoken by characters performing as Koliada carolers. The characters include a shooter (hunter), a peasant, a kitchen boy, a fish merchant, a Tatar servant, and others. While most characters are associated with Christmas traditions, the "Shooter" monologue is linked to Easter, as he asks for valačobnaje (traditional Easter gifts).

The verses were likely part of a school Christmas pageant (interludes), where student actors alternated between humorous speeches and thematic religious verses. Alongside the Belarusian poems, the manuscript contains Polish verses dedicated to the Three Kings and shepherds.

The manuscript lists names of students who likely performed these roles, such as Antos Zakrevski, Tomash Zakrevski, Malinovski, Milashevski, and Symonko. Some names are crossed out, suggesting the texts were used by different students over different years. The texts mention local towns, specifically Smarhon and Kreva.

== Linguistic features ==
The poems are written in the Latin script, while titles, names, and marginal notes are in Cyrillic script.

The language of the monologues is Belarusian. However, there are instances of Polish influence (specifically, Polish past tense verb endings occur twice). The text also contains words with phonetic features characteristic of Ukrainian or West Polesian dialects.

== Example ==
The beginning of the "Shooter" (Stralec) monologue (1752):

Original Latin script

Chopaju mołczać howoryc niesmiej[u]
Szto ja za czołowiek y sto ja umieju
W sławnom mesci Szmorgoniax kolis to uczyłsia
A szto umieł u tom nigdy niepomyliłsia

Modern Belarusian spelling

Хапаю маўчаць, гаварыць не смею,
Што я за чалавек і што я умею.
Ў слаўнам месце Шмаргонях калісь-то учыўся,
А што умеў — у том нігды не памыліўся.

English translation

I keep silent, I dare not speak,
What kind of man I am and what I can do.
In the famous town of Smarhon I once studied,
And what I knew — I never made a mistake in that.

== Bibliography ==
- Брыль, Антон (2020). Барунскія святочныя маналогі: беларускія вершы сярэдзіны XVIII ст. у Базыльянскім рукапісе [Baruny festive monologues: Belarusian poems of the mid-18th century in the Basilian manuscript]. Роднае слова (in Belarusian) (3).
