= Nigar Shikhlinskaya =

Azerbaijani nurse (died 1931)

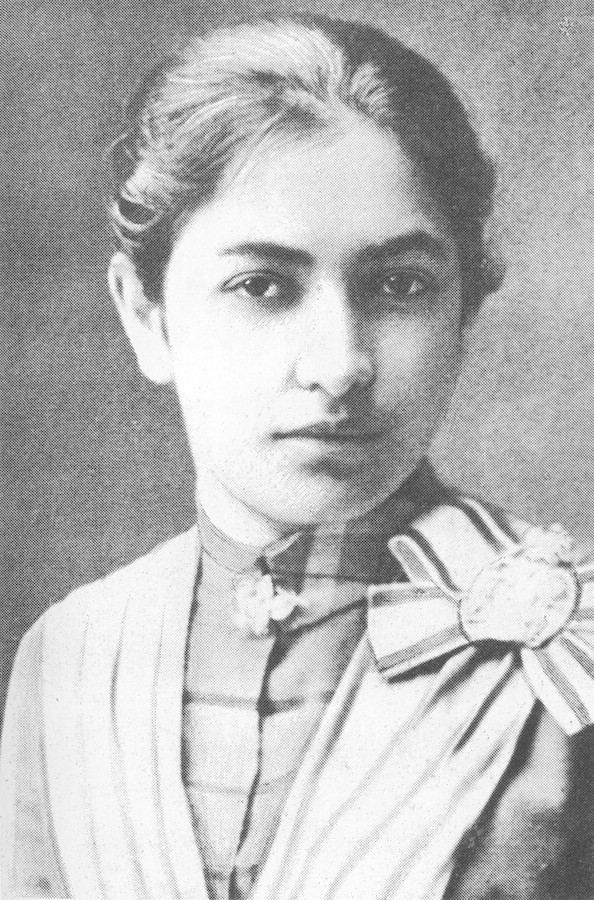
- Born: Nigar Gayibova; 10 October 1871 or 21 March 1878; Tiflis, Russian Empire
- Died: 15 August 1931; Baku, Soviet Union
- Education: Transcaucasian (Tiflis) Female College
- Known for: Pioneer of Azerbaijani nursing and local Red Crescent Society
- Relatives: Farrukh Gayibov; Ali Agha Shikhlinski (husband)
- Medical career
- Profession: Nurse
- Institutions: Red Cross hospital, Western Front of World War I
- Sub-specialties: Nursing, sanitation

Nigar Huseyn Afandi gizi Shikhlinskaya, née Gayibova (Azerbaijani: Nigar Hüseyn Əfəndi qızı Şıxlinskaya; October 10, 1871 or March 21, 1878 in Tiflis – August 15, 1931 in Baku) was the first Azerbaijani nurse. She was fluent in several languages, including Russian and French, and served on the Western Front of World War I, where she opened the Red Cross hospital.

On August 1, 1914 her appeal to women was published in the Russkiy Invalid newspaper. Shikhlinskaya co-ran the Red Cross community, established by officers' wives, until 1918.

== Life ==
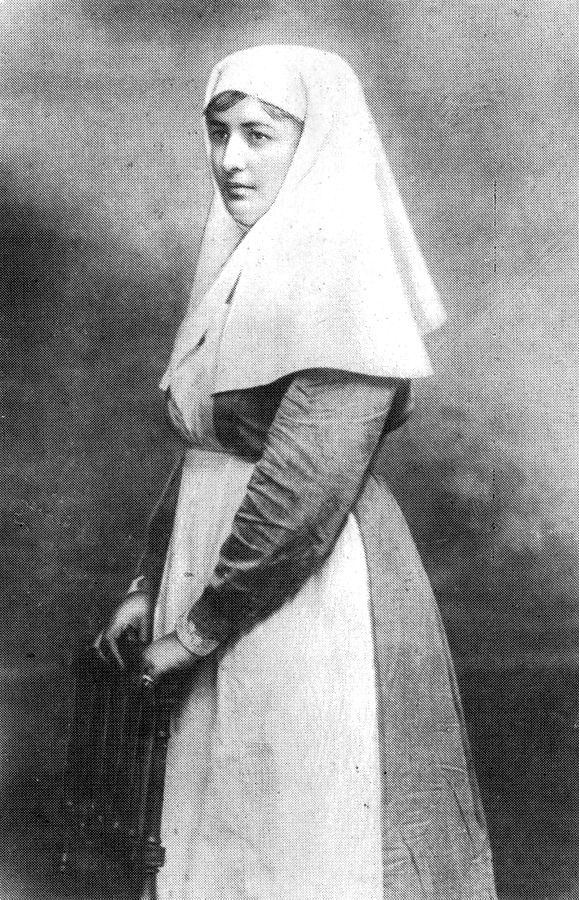
Nigar Shikhlinskaya in 1914

Shikhlinskaya was the daughter of enlightener Huseyn Afandi Gayibov. Having graduated from the Transcaucasian Female College with a gold medal in 1889, she became the first Azerbaijani woman to obtain a higher education. Shikhlinskaya was widowed after the death of Dervish-bek Palavandov of Georgian nobles. On October 27, 1909 she married Colonel and eminent Azerbaijani commander Aliagha Shikhlinski and the couple returned to Tsarskoye Selo.

== The war ==
On August 2, 1914 Nigar followed Shikhlinski to the Guards' Staff of Petersburg Military District. Some time later, Nigar was elected the head of the Ladies' Committee at the Officers' Artillery School. The associated hospital became commonly known as Shikhlinskaya Hospital. Nigar maintained correspondence with her husband in verses, which they dedicated to each other. In his memoirs, Shikhlinski recalls that Nigar wrote letters home for wounded soldiers in two foreign languages (apart from Russian) and was referred to as Mom (Mamasha) by the soldiers. In 1916, Nigar's close relative, Farrukh Gayibov, one of the first combat pilots, died in an air battle. On March 10, 1920 Shikhlinski as Deputy Defense Minister of Azerbaijan Democratic Republic founded the Azerbaijani Red Crescent Society, with Nigar becoming the pioneer nurse there.

In his memoirs, Shikhlinski wrote: "The death of my wife... was a fatal blow for me. Everything has gone away with my wife—both happiness and health". His other quote is "count my death date from Nigar's demise". It is uncertain whether or not Shikhlinskaya had any children. In his article "The Life of General Ali Agha Shikhlinski" Lieutenant Colonel and senior scientific employee Shamistan Nazirli of the Azerbaijani Defense Ministry included a photo, made early in the 20th century, where she is said to be with a son.
