= Chingiz Ildyrym =

- Çingiz İldırım
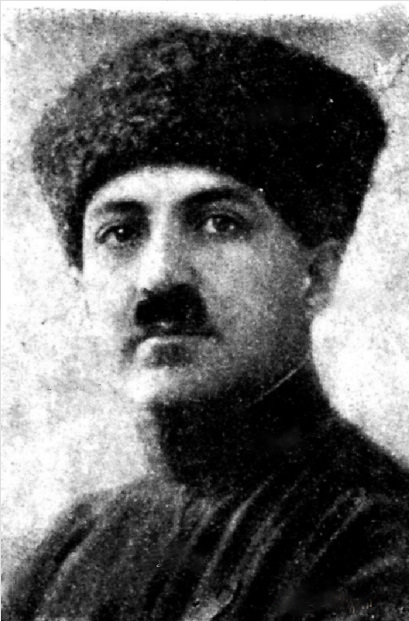

People's Commissar for Military and Naval Affairs of Azerbaijan
- In office 28 April 1920 – June 1920
- Preceded by: office established
- Succeeded by: Aliheydar Garayev

Personal details
- Born: 10 July 1890 Qubadli, Elisabethpol Governorate, Russian Empire
- Died: 27 July 1941 (aged 51) Moscow, Russian SFSR, Soviet Union
- Party: Azerbaijan Communist Party

Military service
- Branch/service: Red Army

Chingiz Ildyrym oglu Sultanov (Azerbaijani: Çingiz İldırım oğlu Sultanov) (10 July 1890 – 27 July 1941), better known as Chingiz Ildyrym, was an Azerbaijani Bolshevik revolutionary, innovator and the first People's Commissar for Military and Naval Affairs of Azerbaijan after the Sovietization of Azerbaijan.

== Early life ==
Ildyrym was born to the Kurdish family of a landowner in Qubadli settlement of Zangezur uyezd of Elisabethpol Governorate (present day Azerbaijan) on 10 July 1890. He studied at a local school established by his father, continued his secondary education in Shusha and then Vladikavkaz, completing it in 1909. He was then admitted to Saint Petersburg Polytechnical University to study mount-mining. While a student, he lost his father and had to work around the clock to be able to support himself. In 1916, he graduated from the university with a specialty in Metallurgy Engineering and got a job at Ayvaz plant. Involved in public protests after Russia's February Revolution, he took part in the gathering to meet Vladimir Lenin returning from Finland at Saint Peterburg railway station on 3 April 1917. Impressed by Lenin's speech, Ildyrym decided to commit himself to the communist movement.

== Political career ==
Having joined the ranks of the Bolsheviks, Ildyrym proposed to create Muslim Labor Red Army, then called Ildyrymmiye, which would defend the Bolshevik governments in regions of Azerbaijan. The first Ildyrymmiye was established in June 1918 in Petrograd and Simal. The same year, Ildyrymmiye army of 2,000 Azerbaijanis fought against the White Army in Astrakhan during the Russian Civil War but due to involvement of Armenian Dashnaks siding with Bolsheviks in massacres of Azerbaijanis during March Days of 1918, Bolsheviks lost their support among Azerbaijanis and the army soon dissolved. In 1919, he returned to Shusha and continued propagating communism. During the short-lived Azerbaijan Democratic Republic (ADR), Ildyrym served as Deputy Commander of Azerbaijani Navy and chief of the harbor under Musavat's leadership although he was a Bolshevik. In 1919, he established a special navy expedition to handle transportation of oil to Russia.

On 27 April, when the 11th Red Army was invading Baku, Ildyrym played an important role in overthrowing the ADR government. With a number of soldiers, he entered Baku Navy school and disarmed the cadets. Later in the day, he captured positions in Bailov, completely taking over the shipyard. All prisoners held in Bailov prison were released, among them well known revolutionaries Rahim Huseynov, Dadash Bunyadzade and Gasim Ismayilov. Once the center of Baku was taken, the Bolsheviks led by Ildyrym surrounded the National Assembly of Azerbaijan with artillery and presented an ultimatum to the Musavat government. In the early morning hours of 28 April 1920, after debates in the parliament, the government agreed to terms of the Bolsheviks and ADR ceased to exit. With the establishment of the Communist regime in Azerbaijan, Chingiz Ildyrym was appointed the first People's Commissar for Military and Naval Affairs of Azerbaijan.

== Later years ==
In 1924, Ildyrym worked as Commissar of Public Roads and presented innovative ideas for road construction in Azerbaijan later applied elsewhere in USSR. He built the first electrified railway in the USSR on the Baku-Sabunchi route. The construction of the Baku-Julfa railway, stretching 407 km in 1924, was his best and most well known project.

In 1924–1928, Ildyrym worked as Deputy Chairman of Supreme Agricultural Council. During his term in the entity, he started electrification policies in Azerbaijan. As a result, 19 electric stations (1500 hp) were built in 1924–1927. This stimulated increase in manufacturing abilities of Azerbaijan and in 1927, steel manufacturing department was established at Lieutenant Schmidt (presently Sattarkhan) Plant. In 1925, 65% of the drilling equipment for Azerbaijani oil fields were switched to electric power.

In 1929, Ildyrym was appointed project manager for construction of Magnitogorsk Iron and Steel Works and from 1934, he was managing construction of one of centers of Soviet metallurgy, Krivoy Rog. During the time of construction boom, Ildyrym was sent to the United States to arrange shipments of necessary materials for construction of the plant in Magnitogorsk.

== Arrest and execution ==
On 7 July 1937 Ildyrym was arrested by NKVD and charged with an alleged anti-revolutionary plot. He was held prisoner in Dnipropetrovsk, Baku and Moscow. In Moscow, he was first jailed in high security Lefortovo Prison and then moved to a more severe location - Sukhanovo Prison, infamous for political prisoners. He was sentenced to death by NKVD and his family was notified he had been sentenced to 10 years without permission to communicate with the outside world. He was executed by firing squad in the summer of 1941.

== See also ==
- Azerbaijani Army
- Ministers of Defense of Azerbaijan Republic
