= Aşağı Salahlı =

Ashaghy Salahly
- Municipality
- Azerbaijani: Aşağı Salahlı
- Location within Azerbaijan
- Coordinates: 41°12′35″N 45°20′04″E
- Country: Azerbaijan
- District: Qazakh

Population
  - Total: 1,624
- Time zone: UTC+4 (AZT)
  - Summer (DST): UTC+5 (AZT)

Aşağı Salahlı (Ashaghy Salahly) is a village and municipality in the Qazax District of Azerbaijan. It has a population of 1,624.
