= Kapustino =

Kapustino Капустино
- Village
- Location within Vologda Oblast Location within Russia
- Coordinates: 59°30′N 39°52′E
- Country: Russia
- Region: Vologda Oblast
- District: Sokolsky District
- Time zone: UTC+3:00

Kapustino (Russian: Капустино) is a rural locality (a village) in Borovetskoye Rural Settlement, Sokolsky District, Vologda Oblast, Russia. The population was 9 as of 2002.

== Geography ==
Kapustino is located 19 km northwest of Sokol (the district's administrative centre) by road. Ofimkino is the nearest rural locality.
