= Baku City Executive Committee =

Baku City Executive Committee (Russian: Бакинский городской исполнительный комитет [Bakinskiy gorodskoy ispolnitel'nyi komitet], commonly known as Bakgorispolkom (Бакгорисполком)) was the main administrative institution of Baku during the Soviet period. Bakgorispolkom was headed by the presidium and consisted of the Chief Architecture Department and Town-planning Council. The head of BCEC was actually the city mayor.

== Heads of BCEC ==
| Name | Term of office |
|---|---|
| Levon Mirzoyan | ?-1925 |
| Ruben Rubenov | January 1933-December 1933 |
| Gurban Khalilov | 1942–1945 |
| Mir Dzhafar Bagirov | 1933–1953 |
| Mamed Iskenderov | 1953–1954 |
| Nasrulla Nasrullayev | 1961–1966 |
| Alish Lemberanskiy | 1958–1966 |
| Ali Kerimov | 1970–1980 |
| Vagif Huseynov | 1980–1983 |
| Muslim Mamedov | 1988–1990 |
| Rufat Agayev | February 1990–1991 |
