= Baruny =

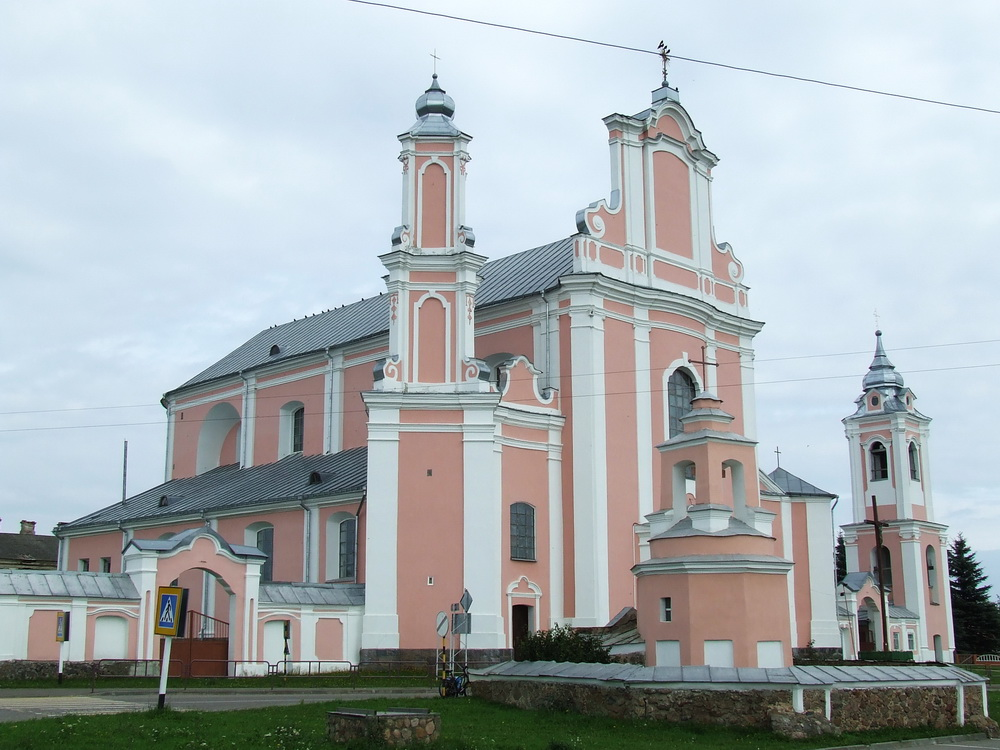
- Interactive map of Baruny
- Coordinates: 54°19′N 26°8′E
- Country: Belarus
- Region: Grodno Region
- District: Ashmyany district
- Elevation: 292 m (958 ft)

Population (2001)
  - Total: 525
- Time zone: UTC+3 (MSK)

Baruny (Belarusian: Баруны; Russian: Баруны, romanized: Baruny; Polish: Boruny; Lithuanian: Barūnai) is a village in Ashmyany district, Grodno region, Belarus. It is located not far from the town of Ashmyany.

In the 18th and 19th centuries the local Basilian monastery was famous for its school, where many of young local noblemen such as poet Antoni Edward Odyniec and writer Ignacy Chodźko received their primary education. The monastery originally rose into prominence because of the venerated image of Virgin Mary, which is still preserved in the church in our days.

== See also ==
- Baruny verses

== Sources ==
- Энцыклапедыя гісторыі Беларусі. У 6 т. Т. 1: А — Беліца / Беларус. Энцыкл.; Рэдкал.: М. В. Біч і інш.; Прадм. М. Ткачова; Маст. Э. Э. Жакевіч. — Мн.: БелЭн, 1993. — 494 с., [8] к.: іл. ISBN 5-85700-074-2 (in Belarusian)
