= Amir Rustamov =

Russian soldier (1909–1979)

Personal details
- Born: 10 December 1909 Shusha, Elizavetpol Governorate, Russian Empire
- Died: 13 April 1979 (aged 69) Baku, Azerbaijan SSR, Soviet Union

Military service
- Branch/service: Soviet Army
- Years of service: 1932–1969
- Rank: Major General
- Battles/wars: World War II

Amir Mammad oglu Rustamov (Azerbaijani: Əmir Məmməd oğlu; 10 December 1909 - 13 April 1979) was a major general of the engineering troops of the Red Army, and later Soviet Army, who served during World War II. He was awarded the Order of the Red Banner, and the Order of the Red Star.

== Life ==
Amir Mammad oglu Rustamov was born on 5 December 1909 in the city of Shusha in the Elizavetpol Governorate of the Russian Empire. He joined the Red Army in 1932. Prior to 1937, as part of various formations of the Red Army, he fought against the Basmachi in Central Asia. In 1941 he graduated from the Kuibyshev Military Engineering Academy. In 1942-1943 he was in action near Rostov and in the Caucasus.

After the war, Rustamov was the head of the operational department of the headquarters of the engineering service of the ground forces. In 1952 he graduated from the Military Academy of the General Staff. From 1952 to 1956 he served as a head of engineering units as part of the Group of Soviet Forces in Germany, from 1956 to 1966 he was the head of the engineering troops of the Siberian Military District. He served as a head of department of the Kuybiyshev Military Engineering Academy between 1966 and 1969.

== Awards ==
- Order of the Red Star
- Order of the Red Banner
- Medal "For Battle Merit"
- Jubilee Medal "XX Years of the Workers' and Peasants' Red Army"

== See also ==
- Azerbaijan in World War II

== Source ==
- Chingizoglu, Anvar (2009). Rustamovs. Baku: Soy.
