= Şimal =

- Location within Azerbaijan
- Coordinates: 41°47′55″N 48°39′12″E
- Country: Azerbaijan
- Rayon: Khachmaz
- Municipality: Nabran

Population (2008)
  - Total: 531
- Time zone: UTC+4 (AZT)
  - Summer (DST): UTC+5 (AZT)

Şimal is a village in the Khachmaz Rayon of Azerbaijan. The village forms part of the municipality of Nabran.
