= Ali Agha Shikhlinski =

Azerbaijani lieutenant-general

- Əli Ağa Şıxlinski;
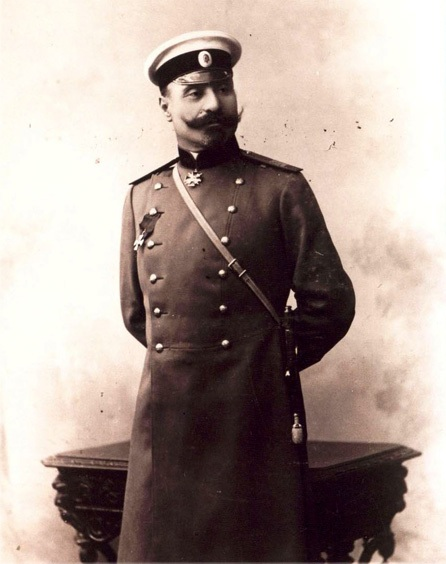
- Shikhlinski in 1905
- Born: March 3, 1863; Kazakh (now Ashaghy Salahly), Kazakhsky Uyezd, Elisabethpol Governorate, Russian Empire
- Died: August 18, 1943 (aged 80); Baku, Azerbaijan SSR, USSR
- Burial place: Yasamal cemetery 40.3636837°N 49.8099878°E
- Spouse: Nigar Shikhlinskaya
- Military career
- Allegiance: Russian Empire (1886–1917); Azerbaijan Democratic Republic (1918–1920); Soviet Union (–1929)
- Branch: Imperial Russian Army; Azerbaijani Armed Forces; Red Army
- Service years: 1886–1929
- Rank: (Russian Empire) Lieutenant general (Azerbaijan Democratic Republic) General of the Artillery
- Nickname: "The God of the Artillery"
- Commands: 5th Battery, 29th Artillery Brigade; 1st Division, 21st Artillery Brigade; 10th Army
- Conflicts: Boxer Rebellion; Russo-Japanese War; Battle of Nanshan; Siege of Port Arthur; World War I; Caucasus Campaign; Battle of Binagadi; Battle of Goychay; Battle of Garamaryam; Battle of Baku; Soviet invasion of Azerbaijan
- Awards: 1st Class Ode of Saint Stanislaus 2nd Class Ode of Saint Stanislaus 3rd Class Ode of Saint Stanislaus Order of Saint Anne 2nd Class Order of Saint Anne 3rd Class Order of Saint Anne 4th Class Order of Saint Anne 2nd Class Order of Saint Vladimir 3rd Class Order of Saint Vladimir 4th Class Order of Saint Vladimir 4th Class Order of Saint George

Ali Agha Ismail Agha oghlu Shikhlinski (Azerbaijani: Əli Ağa İsmayıl Ağa oğlu Şıxlinski; 3 March [O.S. 19 February] 1863 (Note: Dates indicated by the letters "O.S." are in the Julian calendar with the start of year adjusted to 1 January. All other dates in this article are in Gregorian calendar (see Adoption of the Gregorian calendar in Eastern Europe).) – 18 August 1943) was an Azerbaijani lieutenant-general of the Imperial Russian Army, Deputy Minister of Defense and General of the Artillery of Azerbaijan Democratic Republic and a Soviet military officer.

== Life and military career ==
=== Early life ===
Ali Agha Shikhlinski was born on April 23, 1865, in the village of Kazakhly (now Ashaghy Salakhly), in Kazakh uyezd of Elisavethpol Governate. He wrote that his father, Ismayil Agha, was a member of the Shikhlinski Dynasty, a noble family dating back to as early as 1537. Shikhlinski wrote at the "Officer's Notebook" (Azerbaijani: Zabitin dəftəri), a journal he had been working on since 1904, that his mother, Shah Yemen Khanum was the grandchild of Molla Vali Vidadi, an 18th-century poet. Ali Agha Shikhlinsky also had two brothers.

=== Early military career ===
In August 1876 Shikhlinski entered Tiflis military school and graduated in 1883. He continued his education at Mikhailovsky Artillery Academy in Saint Petersburg as a Junker. He was a capable student, excelled as a cavalryman and as a gymnast. Upon graduation from the first grade school, on August 11, 1886, Ali Agha Shikhlinski was promoted to podporuchik and was assigned to the 39th Artillery Brigade stationed in the city of Alexandropol (now Gyumri). In the course of military service he was promoted to poruchik, then shtabs-kapitan and appointed as commander of the training team. In 1900, Captain Shikhlinski was transferred to Transbaikal Artillery Battalion in Eastern Siberia. He was appointed to the Battery Chief of Transbaikal Artillery Division in the detachment, as well as chairperson of the Artillery Committee, he repeatedly carried out the authorizations of battalion and division commanders. He took part in China Relief Expedition of the Russian Imperial Army.

=== Russo-Japanese War ===
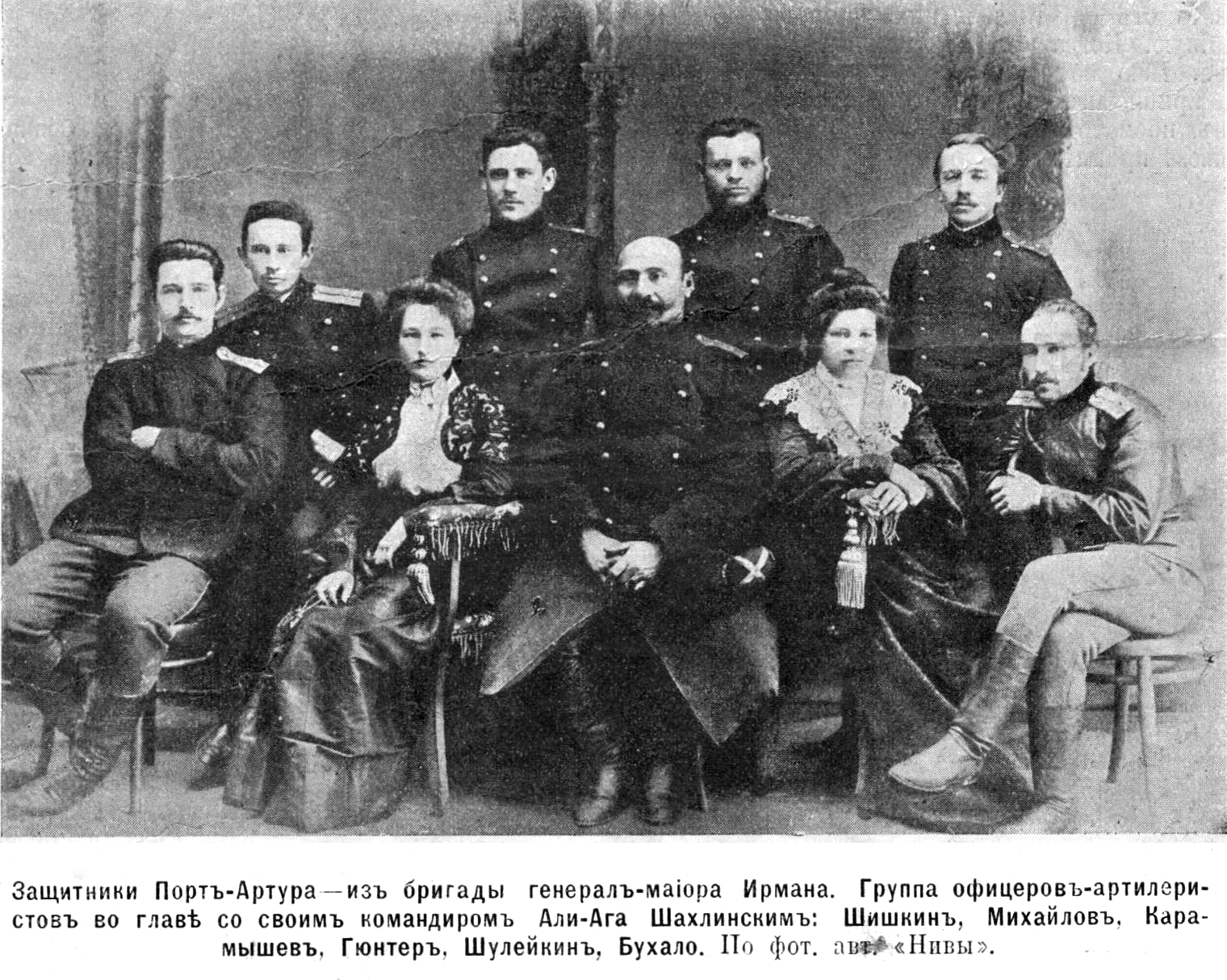
Artillery officers with Shikhlinski in middle (1905, Port Arthur)

During the Russo-Japanese War Shikhlinski was the commander of an artillery battery. He distinguished himself during the siege of Port Arthur when, despite being severely wounded in his leg, he personally aimed the guns which lost their gun crews and repulsed attacks of superior Japanese forces.

For the services in battle on September 28, 1905, he was decorated with the Order of Saint George 4th degree. He was also awarded a Saint George Sword and conferred the rank of lieutenant-colonel.

=== Officer's Artillery College ===
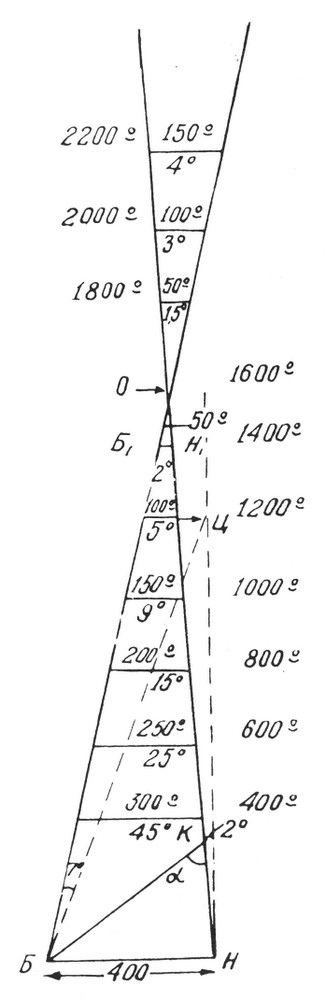
Scheme of "Triangle of Shikhlinski"

In January 1906, Shikhlinski was seconded to Tsarskoye Selo Officer's Artillery College, which he finished with honors in August of the same year and was appointed the instructor of the Artillery College. During his service as the instructor of the college Shikhlinski published a number of works on artillery, including a book titled “Use of Field Artillery in a Battle”, and invented an original target-finding device, which was called “Shiklinski triangle”. In 1908 Shiklinski was promoted to the rank of colonel, and in 1912 he was conferred the rank of major-general and assigned the deputy chief of Officer's Artillery College.

=== World War I ===
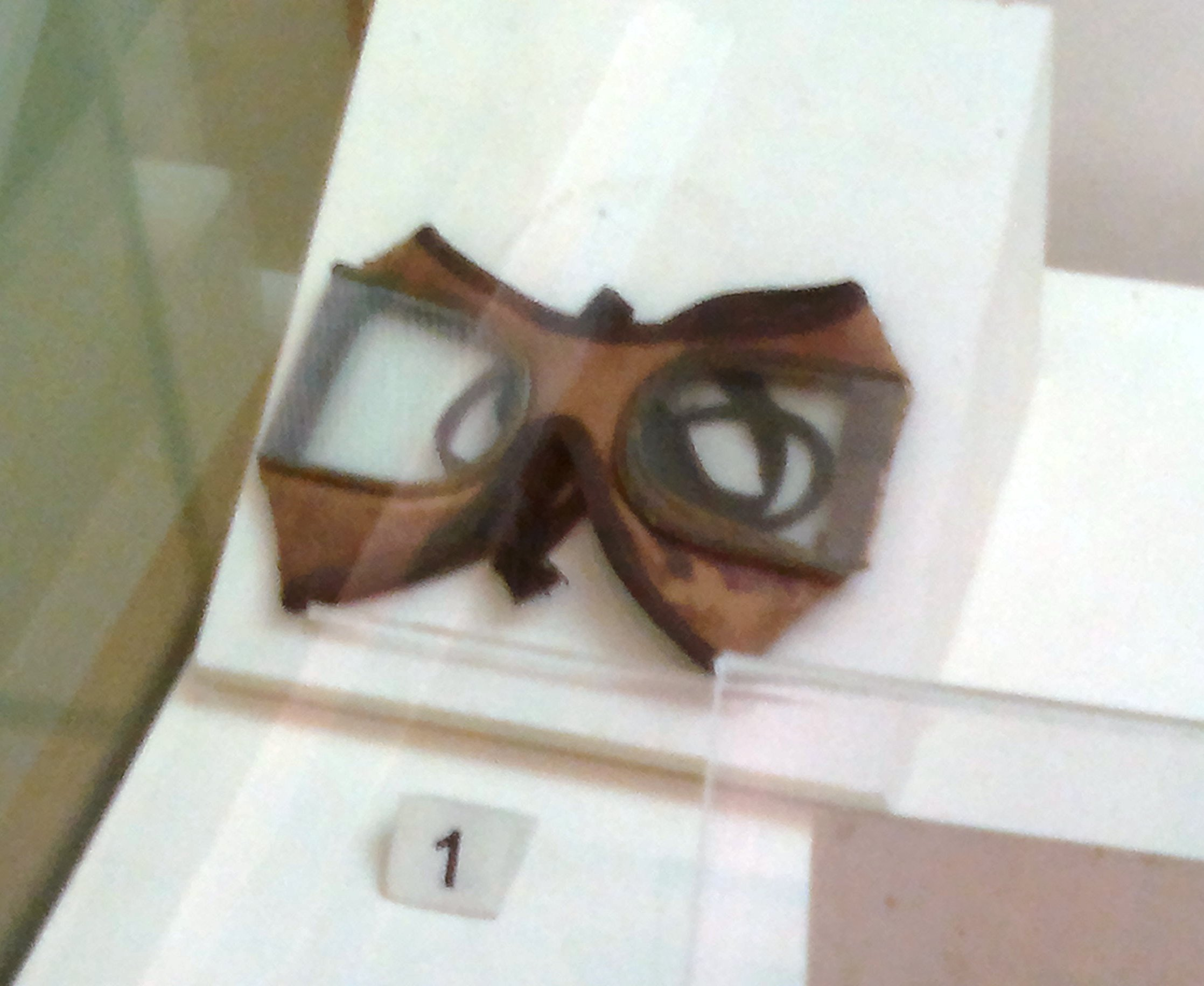
Ali Agha Shikhlinski's protective glasses that he wore in the First World War (Azerbaijani National Museum of History)

When World War I started in 1914 Ali-Agha Shikhlinski was appointed the commander of St. Petersburg garrison artillery. In January 1915, Shikhlinski was seconded to the Northwestern front to manage the training of heavy artillery guncrews. On May 23, 1915, he was appointed the general for errands at the commander-in-chief of the Northwestern front, and after division of the front into two held the same position at the Western front. On October 31, 1915, he was appointed to the position of the general for errands at the Supreme Commander-in-Chief. He was charged with the creation of heavy artillery battalions and brigades. From April 1916 16, Shikhlinski was the acting inspector of Western Front artillery. He was in charge of the artillery aspects of operations of the Western Front. On April 2, 1917, Ali Agha Shikhlinski was promoted to the rank of lieutenant-general.

=== Azerbaijani National Army ===
After the February Revolution in Russia, Ali Agha Shikhlinski was appointed the commander of the 10th Russian army in September 1917. After the October Revolution, he resigned from his position and moved to Tiflis, where he was charged with formation of the Muslim (Azerbaijani) corps. The corps supported the Ottoman Army of Islam in the Battle of Baku with Bolshevik and British forces. In January 1919, the government of Azerbaijan Democratic Republic appointed Shikhlinski a deputy to the Minister of Defense of Azerbaijan Republic Samad bey Mehmandarov. On June 28, 1919, Ali-Agha Shikhlinski was promoted to the rank of General of the Artillery of the Azerbaijani army. After the Red Army invasion of Azerbaijan and establishment of the Soviet regime in Azerbaijan in April 1920, Shikhlinski was arrested and released two months later.

=== Red Army ===
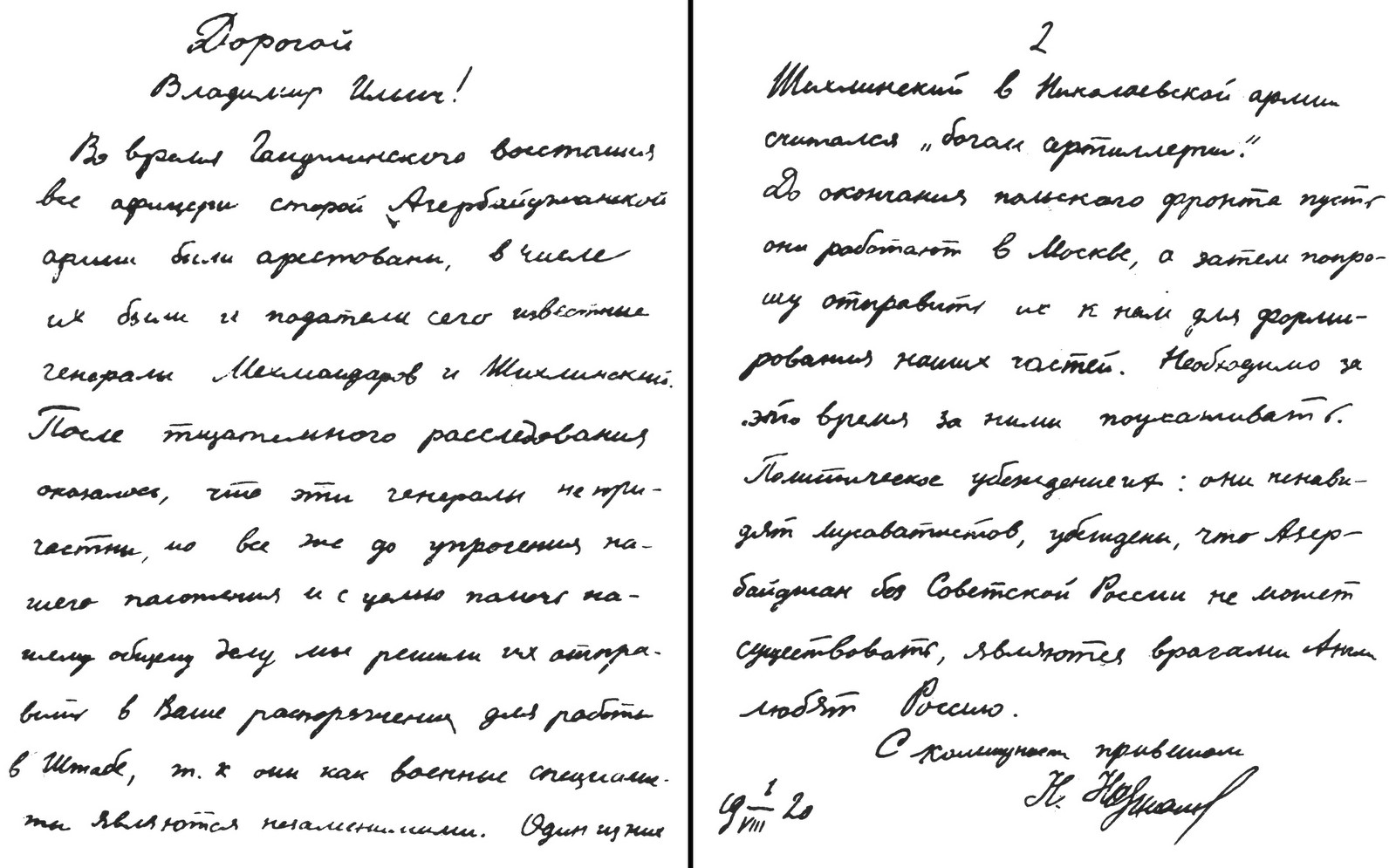
Letter about Samad bey Mehmandarov and Ali Agha Shiklinski that Nariman Narimanov sent to Vladimir Lenin (1920)

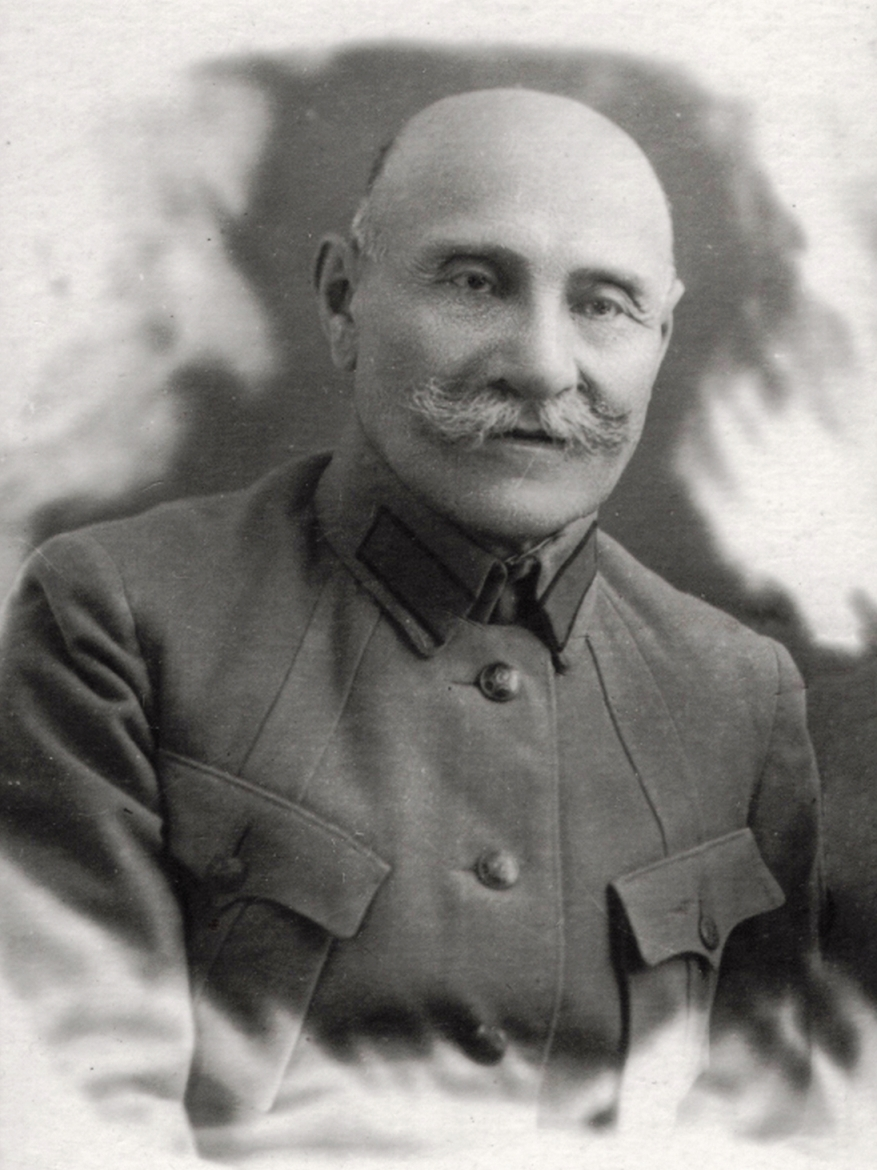
Ali Agha Shikhlinsky in Red Army commander uniform (17 February 1929)

In 1920–1921, he was seconded to Moscow, where he was an adviser to the artillery inspection department of Red Army and taught in Higher Artillery School. On 18 July 1921, Shikhlinski was transferred back to Baku, where he taught at a military school and became a deputy to the chairman of the military science society of Baku garrison. In 1926, Shikhlinsky published the Russian-Azerbaijani Concise Military Dictionary. He resigned from military service in 1929 and wrote his memoirs, which were published in 1944.

=== Death ===
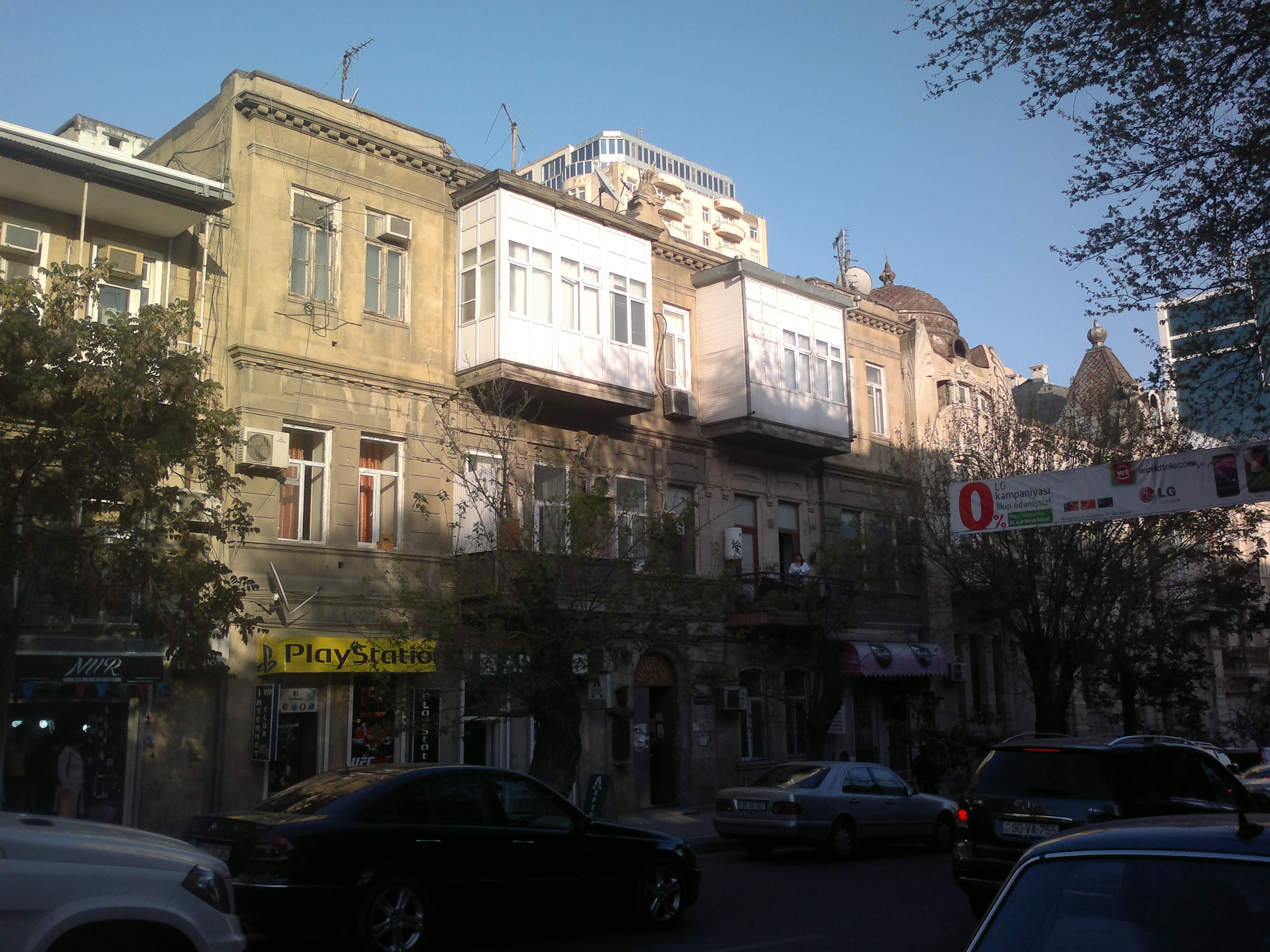
The building that Ali-Agha Shikhlinsky lived in Baku

He spent his last days in his house, apartment 14 of Jafar Jabbarly Street in Baku. Prior to his death, Ali Agha Shikhlinski wrote his memoirs "My Memories" in 1942. The book was published nine months after the general's death, in May 1944. A well-known Russian and Soviet military specialist, Doctor of Military Sciences, Major-General Evgeny Barsukov wrote a preface to the book. This book was published by "Azərnəşr" in Azerbaijani and Russian in 1984 with mass circulation (60 thousand) with additions and explanations.

The funeral of Ali Agha Shikhlinski, who died of cardiosclerosis in the hospital now named after Agha Musa Naghiyev on August 18, 1943, was organized by philosopher Heydar Huseynov himself. The funeral was accompanied by an orchestra from the Baku Military Garrison.

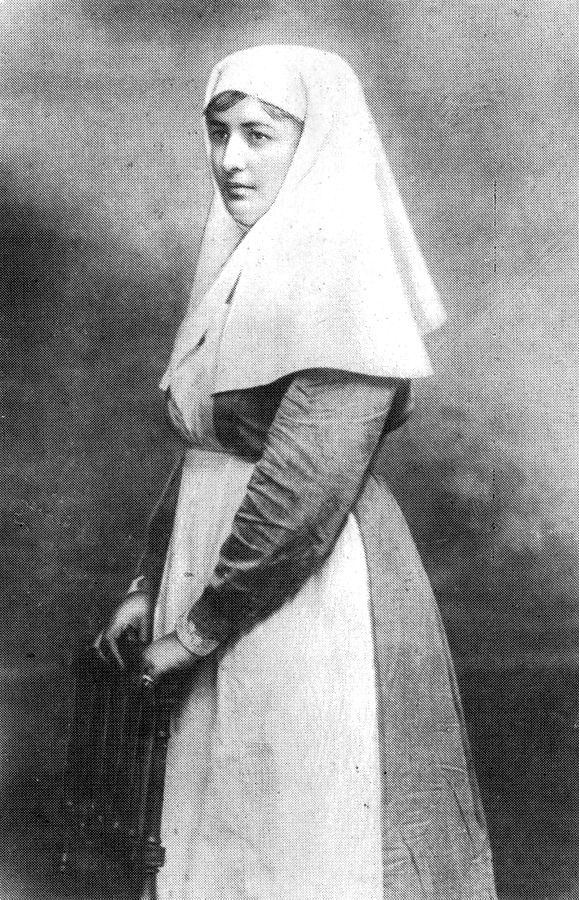
Ali Agha's wife Nigar Shikhlinskaya was the first Azerbaijani nurse

== Legacy ==
A short biographical film named "The General", directed by Rauf Kazimovski, was released in 1970. An Azerbaijan Caspian Shipping Company tanker was named after him in 1980. There is a street in Baku and Gazakh named after him. By the decision of the Council of Ministers of the Azerbaijan SSR dated July 28, 1990, the sixth cotton collective farm in Sabirabad District and 135th secondary school, located in the seventh Micro-District of Baku, was named after him. There is a memorial bass-relief on the building that he lived in. On July 23, 1990, under the decree of the President of the Republic of Azerbaijan, "General Ali Agha Shikhlinski" scholarship was established for the students of higher education. In 1996, a descendant of the military commander, film director Zia Shikhlinski, made a short documentary film named "Was considered the god of artillery", which was aired on November 16, 2006, in Baku, organized with the assistance of the Russian Embassy in Azerbaijan. In 2014, President of Azerbaijan Ilham Aliyev signed an order on commemorating the 150th anniversary of General Ali Agha Shikhlinski.

A well-known Russian and Soviet military specialist, Doctor of Military Sciences Evgeny Barsukov wrote about him:

Ali Agha Shikhlinsky was one of the few Russian gunners who possessed deep theoretical and practical knowledge in the field of tactics and had a rare talent in the art of applying this knowledge in practice, especially in combat. In this sense, he was my most faithful adherent, and it is to him that Russian artillery is very much obliged by its skillful combat operations on the battlefields. We were in many respects in solidarity with him, I think I will not be mistaken if I say that the main idea of civic duty was with Ali Agha, who, like me, guided, recognizing the Soviet power, was convinced: "I always served honestly and will serve my people, from which he left, and to the government, which my people put above themselves"

Ali Agha Shikhlinski was one of the characters of Russian-Soviet writer Alexander Nikolaevich Stepanov's "Port-Arthur" and "Zvonaryov Family" novels.

Despite his rank, there were no signs of arrogance in Ali Agha. Although General Shikhlinski did not finish his military academy, his natural intelligence and practical perception led him to a great influence in artillery science.

— Alexander Nikolaevich Stepanov, "Zvonaryov Family"

=== Films ===
- The General (1970 film) (Azerbaijani: General)
- Was Considered The God of Artillery (Azerbaijani: Artilleriyanın allahı sayılırdı)
- Honorable Commander: General Ali Agha Shikhlinski (Azerbaijani: Sərkərdə ləyaqəti. General Əli ağa Şıxlinski)

== Honours and medals ==
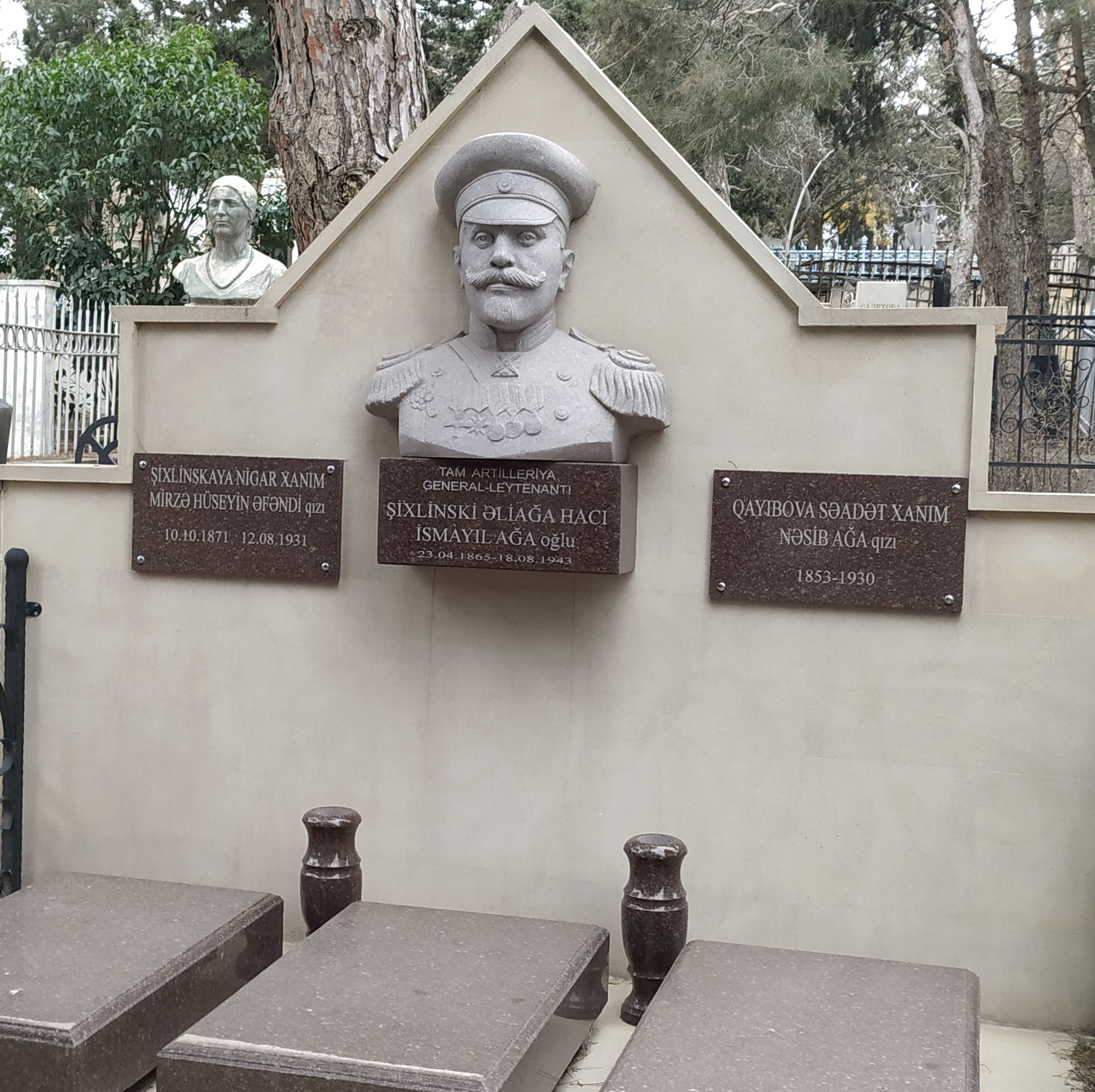
Grave of Ali Agha Shikhlinski in Baku

- (Russian Empire) 3rd Class Order of Saint Stanislaus (1891)
- (Russian Empire) 3rd Class Order of Saint Anne (1896)
- (Russian Empire) 2nd Class Order of Saint Stanislaus with Swords (1901)
- (Russian Empire) 2nd Class Order of Saint Anne (1904)
- (Russian Empire) Gold Sword for Bravery (1905)
- (Russian Empire) 4th Class Order of Saint Anne for Bravery (1905)
- (Russian Empire) 2nd Class Order of Saint Anne (1905)
- (Russian Empire) 4th Class Order of Saint George (1905)
- (Russian Empire) 4th Class Order of Saint Vladimir with Swords and Banners (1905)
- (Russian Empire) Russo-Japanese Silver War Medal (1907)
- (Russian Empire) The Highest Favor (1907)
- (Russian Empire) Bronze Medal "In memory of the 300th anniversary of the reign of the Romanov dynasty" (1913)
- (France) Legion of Honour (1913)
- (Russian Empire) 3rd Class Order of Saint Vladimir (1913)
- (Russian Empire) 1st Class Order of Saint Stanislaus (1915)
- (Russian Empire) 1st Class Order of Saint Anne (1915)
- (Russian Empire) 2nd Class Order of Saint Vladimir with Swords (1915)

== Bibliography ==
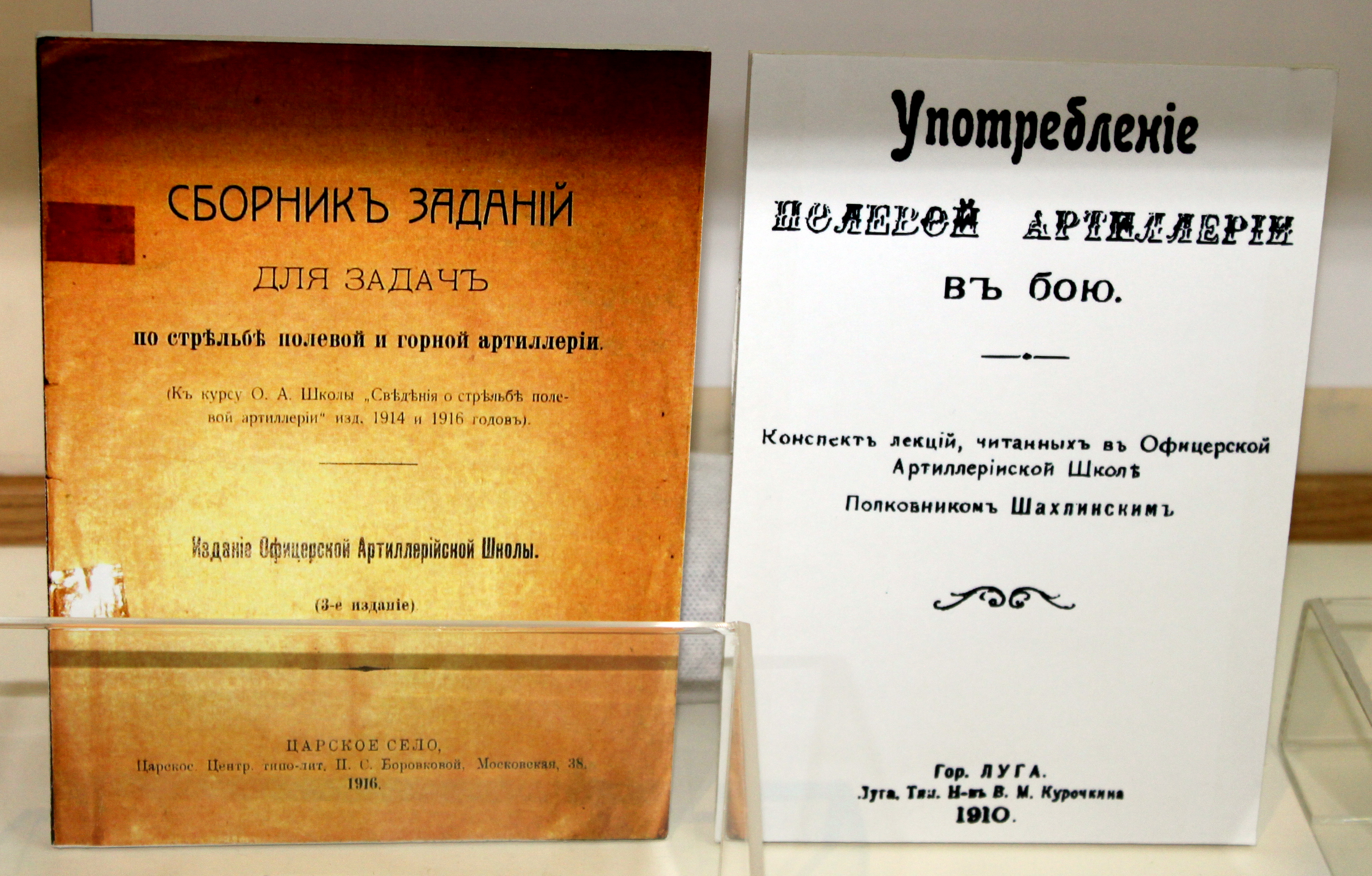
Books written by Ali Agha Shikhlinski

=== Works ===
- "Use of artillery in the battlefield" (1910)
- "A set of tasks for solving mountain and field artillery problems" (1916)
- "Russian-Azerbaijani brief military dictionary" (1926)
- "Worker-Peasant Red Army Artilleryman's Instructions" (1927)
- "My Memories" (1944)

== Gallery ==
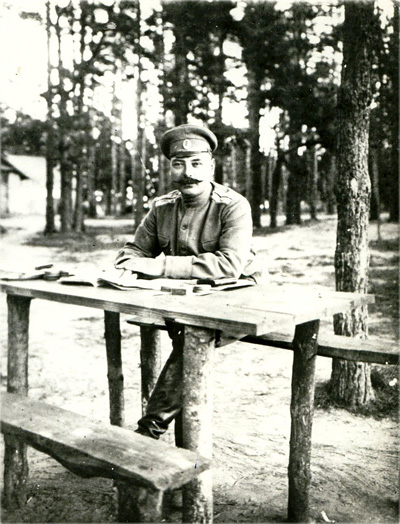
Ali Agha Shikhlinski in the Imperial Russian Army (Early 20th century)

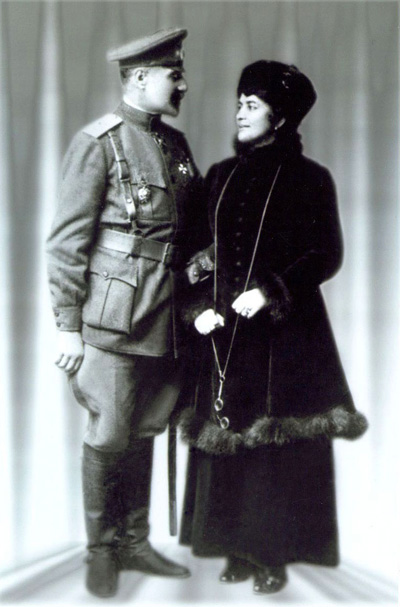
Ali Agha Shikhlinski and his wife Nigar Shikhlinskaya (Early 20th century)

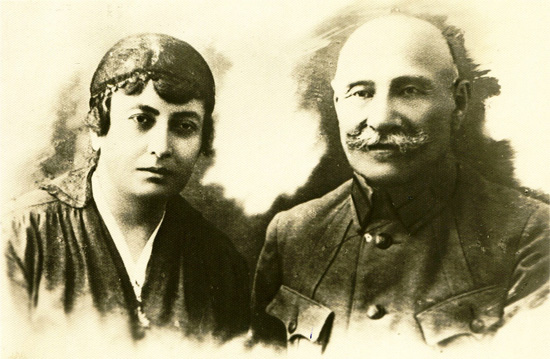
Ali Agha Shikhlinski and his wife Nigar Shikhlinskaya (1920's)

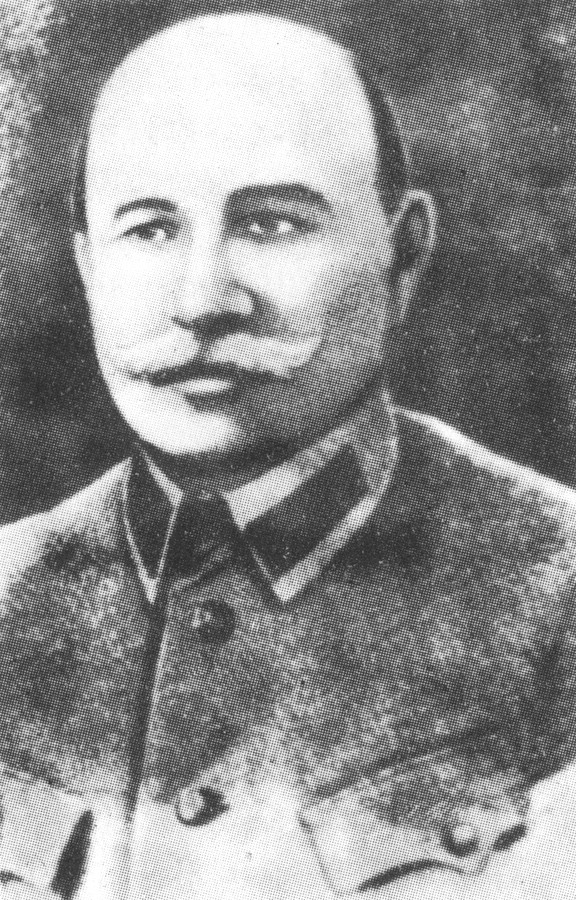
Major-General Ali Agha Shikhlinski (1920)

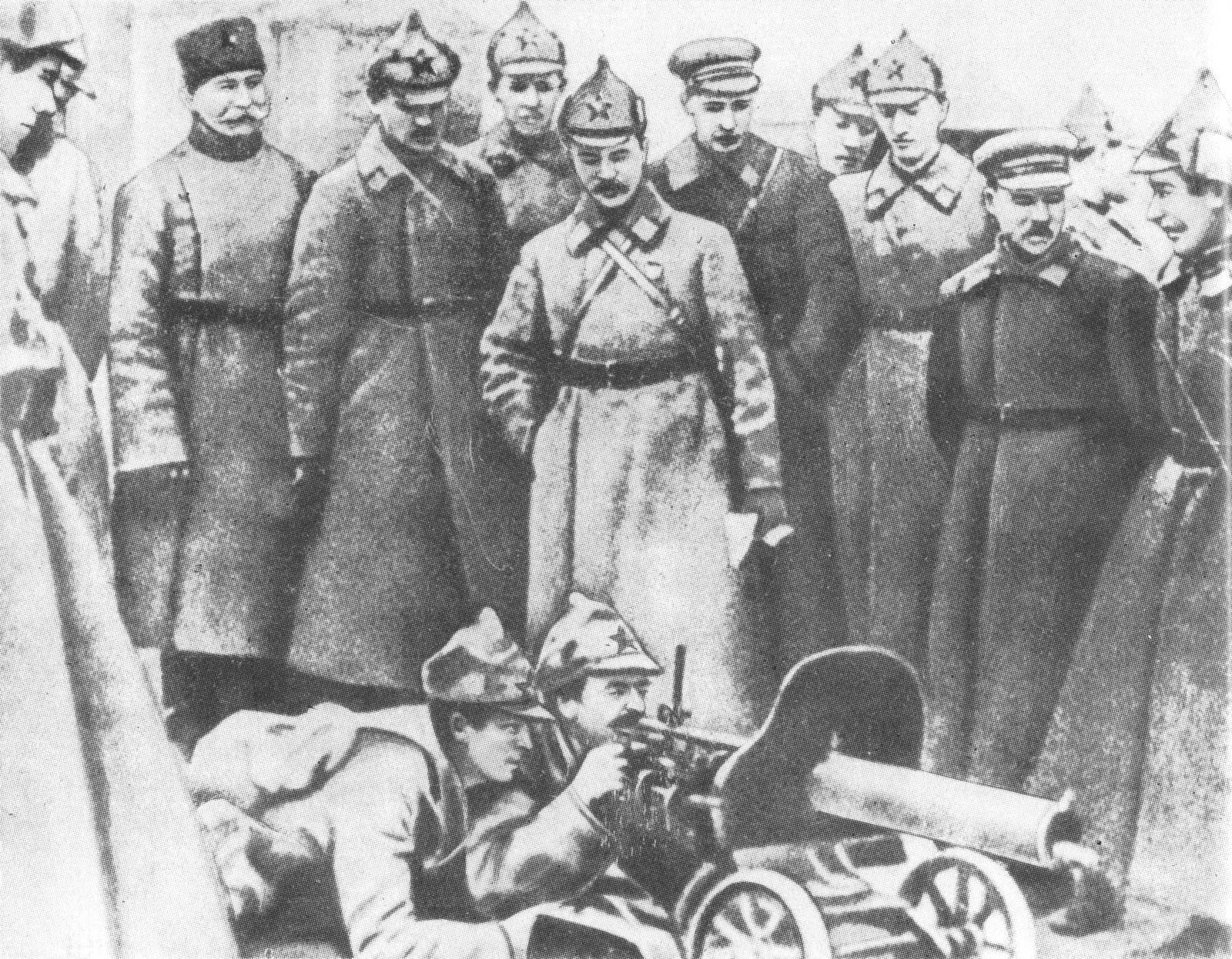
Mikhail Frunze at combat training of the Azerbaijani Soldiers of the Red Army (April 1925)

== See also ==
- Samad bey Mehmandarov
- Hasan bey Aghayev
- Nasib bey Yusifbeyli
