= Salahlı =

Salahlı (Salahly) may refer to:

- Salahlı Kəngərli, Azerbaijan
- Salahlı, Agstafa, Azerbaijan
- Salahlı, Samukh, Azerbaijan
- Salahlı, Yevlakh, Azerbaijan
- Salahlı, Zardab, Azerbaijan
- Aşağı Salahlı, Azerbaijan
- Azər Salahlı (born 1994), Azerbaijani footballer
- Daş Salahlı, Azerbaijan
- Orta Salahlı (disambiguation)
- Yuxarı Salahlı, Azerbaijan
