= Religious Council of the Caucasus =

Islamic organization based in Azerbaijan

- Qafqaz Müsəlmanları İdarəsi
- Formation: 1944
- Headquarters: Baku
- Shaykh al-Islam: Allahshukur Pashazadeh
- Mufti: Salman Musayev
- Website: https://qafqazislam.com/?lang=en

Caucasus Muslims Board, until 1992 called The Spiritual Board of the Muslims of Transcaucasia, is the highest spiritual and administrative organ of the Muslims of the countries of the Transcaucasus located in Baku.

== History ==
=== Period of the Russian Empire ===
The history of the administration begins in 1823. Thus in 1823, the post of religious leader shaykh al-Islam was established in Tbilisi to lead Transcaucasia Shias. 9 years later in 1832, the position of mufti the head of Caucasian Sunnis, also was established in Tbilisi. The first mufti was proposed by russian general Georg Rosen.

In 1872, Alexander II of Russia created the Transcaucasian Muslim spiritual administrations of Sunni and Shia schools. Madrasas (schools) were solemnly opened on January 2, 1873 in Tbilisi. In the South Caucasus two Muslim administrative organs were created the Sunni Spiritual Administration headed by the Mufti and the Shia Spiritual Administration chaired by the Sheikh. Each of these two subdivision located in Tbilisi consisted of a chairman (mufti or shaykh al-Islam), 3 members of the board, a secretary with 2 assistants, a translator, a scribe and an archivist. Shaykh al-Islam and the mufti could be appointed by the Caucasian viceroy. Until 1867 only shaykh al-Islam and the mufti received salaries from the government, but from that year other high-ranking Muslim clerics began to receive it.

The spiritual jurisdiction of these institutions extended to the Muslims of Baku, Elisavetpol, Tiflis and Erivan governorates.

=== Period of the Republic ===
After the declaration of the Azerbaijan Democratic Republic on May 28, 1918, the government of Azerbaijan faced such an issue: the Spiritual Administration of the Muslims of the Caucasus (Transcaucasia) located in the city of Tbilisi should be transferred to the city of Baku and the post of shaykh al-Islam, which was abolished in 1917 should be re-established.

Thus, at the beginning of 1918 the Administration was transferred to Baku, and akhund Agha-Alizadeh became the only candidate for the highest clerical rank, Sheikhul-Islam. During the republic, the spiritual administration was called Mashkhati-Islamiyya.

=== Soviet period ===
On April 14, 1944, it was established on the initiative of the leadership of the USSR as the Spiritual Administration of the Muslims of Transcaucasia. On May 25–28, 1944, the First Congress of Muslims of Transcaucasia took place. At the congress, Agha-Alizadeh was re-elected chairman of the Spiritual Board of Muslims of Transcaucasia and again received the religious rank of shaykh al-Islam. He is also the first shaykh al-Islam elected in the history of the administration, until then sheikhulislams were appointed by the state. At that congress, the Charter of the Spiritual Administration was approved and its leadership (the mufti and the members of the spiritual administration, along with shaykh al-Islam) were elected.

=== At the time of independence ===
After the collapse of the Soviet Union, it received its modern name — "Religious Council of the Caucasus" (Caucasian Muslims Board). In 1992, Haji Allahshukur Pashazadeh was elected chairman of the Supreme Religious Council of the Caucasian Peoples by the religious figures of Azerbaijan, Georgia, Dagestan, Kabardino-Balkaria, Ingushetia, Chechnya, Karachay-Cherkessia and Adygea Republics.

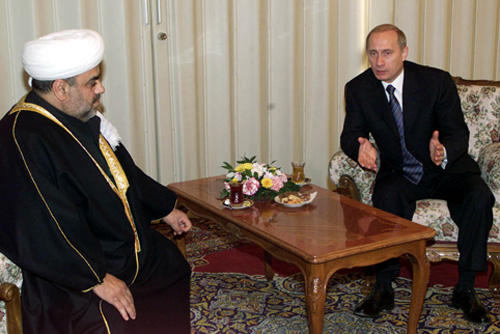
Shaykh al-Islam Haji Allahshukur Pashazadeh at a meeting with Russian President Vladimir Putin. January 10, 2001

According to the charter, the head of the Caucasian Muslims Office must be a Shia and his deputy a Sunni. This is the only such hierarchy among the Spiritual Administration of Muslims of the former Soviet Union.

In 2003, Haji Allahshukur Pashazadeh was elected shaykh al-Islam for life at the 11th Congress of Muslims of the Caucasus. The last 12th Congress of Caucasian Muslims was held in Baku on August 12, 2009.

In Georgia, where 800,000 Muslims live, a representative office of the Administration of Caucasian Muslims was also opened. In August 2011, a new Islamic institution was established in Georgia, which was not subordinated to the Administration of Caucasian Muslims.

== Leaders ==
The head of the Shia community shaykh al-Islam is the chairman of the Caucasian Muslims Broad. The Mufti, who is the head of the Sunni community is his deputy.

=== Shaykh al-Islams ===
The first rank of shaykh al-Islam in the Caucasus was established in 1823. So far, 12 people have become shaykh al-Islam. The period of their tenure is given in the following table:

#	Name	
1	Mahammadali Huseinzadeh	1823–1846
2	Fazil Iravani	1846–1862
3	Ahmad Huseinzadeh	1862–1884
4	Mirza Hasan Tahirzadeh	1885–1894
5	Abdussalam Akhundzadeh	1895–1907
6	Mahammad Hasan Movlazadeh Shakavi	1907–1909
7	Mahammad Pishnamazzadeh	1909–1918
8	Agha Alizadeh	1918–1920 1944–1954
9	Muhsin Hakimzadeh	1954–1966
10	Ali-Agha Suleymanzadeh	1968–1976
11	Mirgazanfer Ibragimov	1978–1979
12	Allahshukur Pashazadeh	1980–present

=== Muftis ===
The first mufti of Muslims belonging to the Sunni Islamic school in the Caucasus was established in 1832. Until now there have been 11 muftis. Their tenure is shown in the table below:

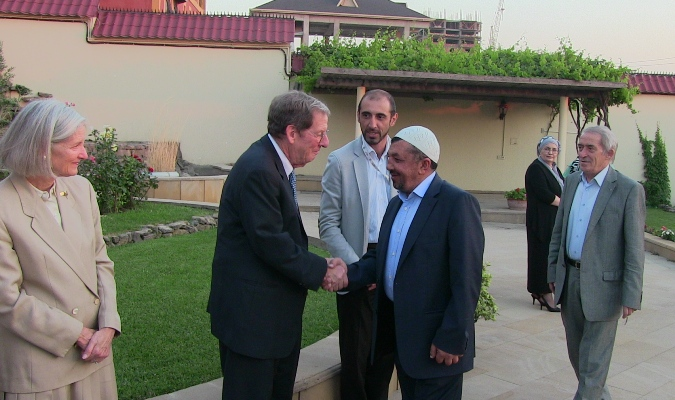
Meeting of Richard Morningstar and Salman Musayev during the Iftar table opened by the US Embassy. July 10, 2014

#	Name	Period
1	Tajuddin Mustafin	1832–1840
2	Osman Velizade	1842–1847
3	Muhammed Muftizadeh	1847–1880
4	Abdul Hamid Efendizadeh	1872–1880
5	Mirza Huseyn Afandi Qayibov	1883–1917
6	Ibrahim Efendizadeh	1944–1955
7	Asadulla Dibirov	1956–1959
8	Sharif Velizade	1960–1966
9	Ahmad Bozgeziev	1968–1969
10	Ismail Ahmedov	1969–1986
11	Salman Musayev	1989–present

== See also ==
- Category:Shaykh al-Islams of the Religious Council of the Caucasus
- Category:Muftis of the Religious Council of the Caucasus
- Islam in the Soviet Union
- Islam in Russia
- Muftiate
- Taza Pir Mosque

== Sources ==
- Caucasus Muslims Board
- Nurullayev, Fuad Ízzät oğlu; İdaräsi, Qafqaz Müsülmanları (2014). Şeyxülislamlıq zirväsi Haci allahşükür Paşazadä. ISBN 978-9952-490-50-3. OCLC 1021181124.
