= Mir Gazanfar Ibrahimov =

Azerbaijani religious leader (1904–1980)

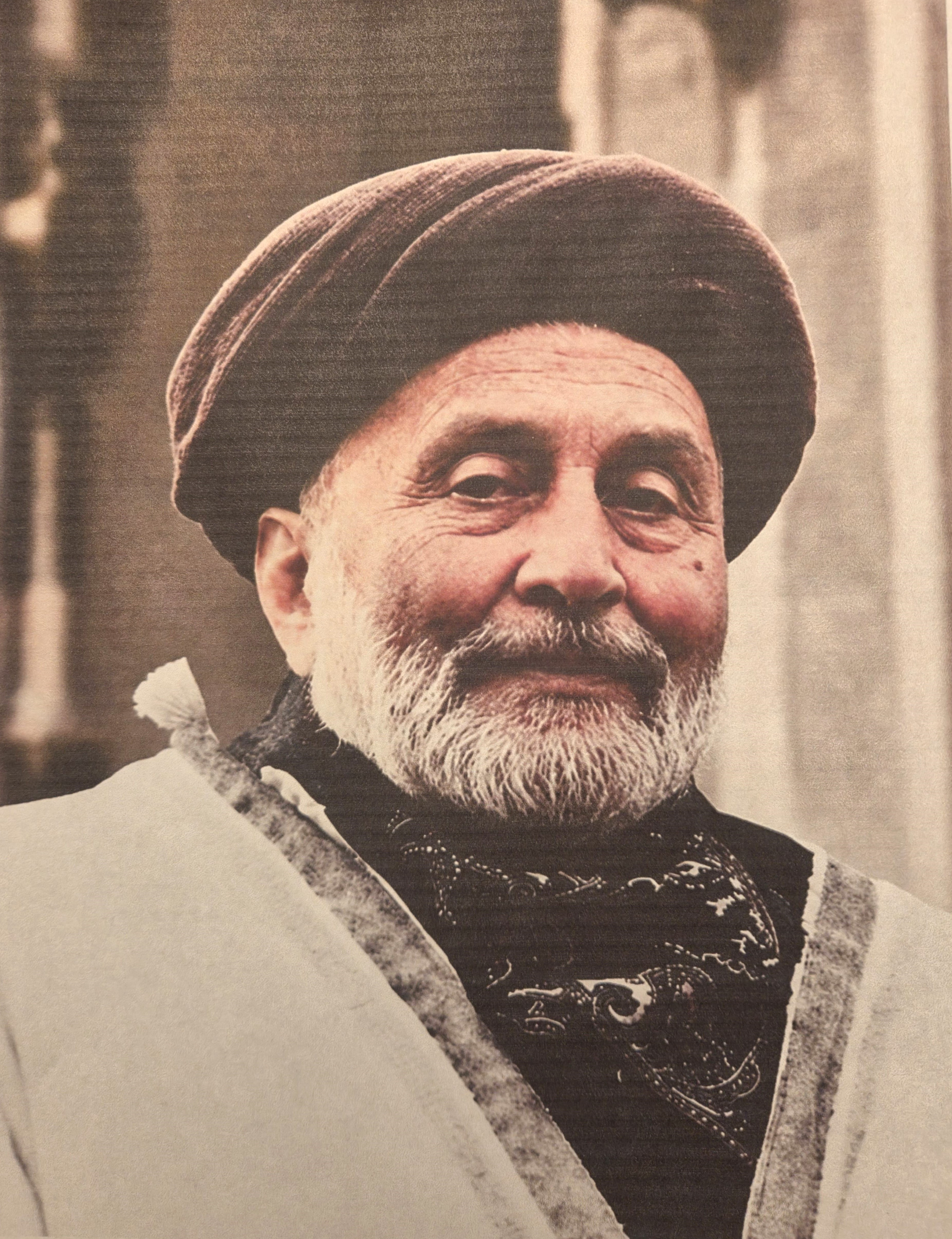
- Haji Mir Gazanfar Ibrahimov, 1979

Personal life
- Born: 22 March 1904 Quba, Baku Governorate, Russian Empire
- Died: 3 November 1980 (aged 76) Baku, Azerbaijan SSR, USSR
- Spouse: Asiya Ramazan gizi Ramazanova (1910–1991)
- Children: Mir Ali, Mir Huseyn, Oktay, Mir Sohrab, Fatmakhanim, Mir Saib
- Parents: Mashadi Mir Alekper Ibrahim-zade (father); Mashadi Seid Fatmakhanim Ibrahim-zade (mother)

Religious life
- Religion: Islam
- Denomination: Shia
- School: Ja'fari
- Sect: Twelver
- Jurisprudence: Usuli

Muslim leader
- Post: Sheikh ul-Islam of the Caucasus
- Period in office: 1978–1980
- Predecessor: Ali-Agha Suleymanzadeh
- Successor: Allahshukur Pashazadeh

Haji Mir Gazanfar Mir Alekper oglu Ibrahimov (Azerbaijani: Hacı Mir Qəzənfər Mir Ələkbər oğlu İbrahimov; Russian: Хаджи Мир Газанфар Мир Алекпер оглы Ибрагимов; 22 March 1904, Quba, Baku Governorate, Russian Empire – 3 November 1980, Baku, Azerbaijan SSR) was an akhund and the 11th Sheikh ul-Islam of the Muslims of the Caucasus.

== Biography ==
Ibrahimov was born on 22 March 1904 in the city of Quba, Baku Governorate of the Russian Empire, into a family of hereditary akhunds. His father, Mashadi Mir Alekper Ibrahim-zade, served as akhund of the Quba mosque, where the future Sheikh received his early religious education at the maktab attached to the mosque.

In 1913, following his father's death, his mother, Mashadi Seid Fatmakhanim, took him to the city of Mashhad (Iran), where she had earlier made a pilgrimage and received the title "Mashadi". From 1914 to 1919, Mir Gazanfar studied at one of the madrasas near the mausoleum of Imam Reza in Mashhad. At the end of 1919 the family returned home, to what had by then declared independence as the Azerbaijan Democratic Republic.

After the establishment of Soviet power, he did not engage in religious activity until his retirement in 1965, working instead in state organizations. He later served as deputy chairman of the Spiritual Board of the Muslims of Transcaucasia (SBMT).

In 1968 he was appointed akhund of the mosque in the city of Goychay, where he served for ten years; he was recommended for this post by his predecessor, Sheikh ul-Islam Ali-Agha Suleymanzadeh.

In late February–early March 1969, during the days of Eid al-Adha, he performed the Hajj to Mecca, receiving the title "Haji". In July of the same year, as part of a delegation of the Spiritual Board of the Muslims of Transcaucasia, he took part in a conference of representatives of all religions in the USSR, organized by the Russian Orthodox Church in Zagorsk, titled "For Cooperation and Peace Among Peoples". He spoke Arabic, Persian, Turkish, Azerbaijani, Russian, and Tatar.

Following the death of Ali-Agha Suleymanzadeh, who died on 26 November 1977, Ibrahimov was elected on 7 March 1978 at the 7th Congress of Muslim clergy and mosque representatives of Transcaucasia (46 delegates from Azerbaijan, Armenia, and Georgia) as chairman of the Spiritual Board — Sheikh ul-Islam. His candidacy was proposed by the SBMT's executive secretary Allahshukur Pashazadeh, who was himself elected deputy chairman for Shia affairs at the same congress, and who later succeeded Ibrahimov as Sheikh ul-Islam.

As late as July 1979 Ibrahimov was still performing the duties of Sheikh ul-Islam, receiving a delegation from the United States at the Taza Pir Mosque in Baku — a fact that directly contradicts the death date of 1979 found in some reference sources. On 14 July 1979, Ibrahimov received participants of a bilateral seminar of Soviet and American youth representatives devoted to Soviet–American relations, and held a conversation with the American delegation's representative Walter Cline.

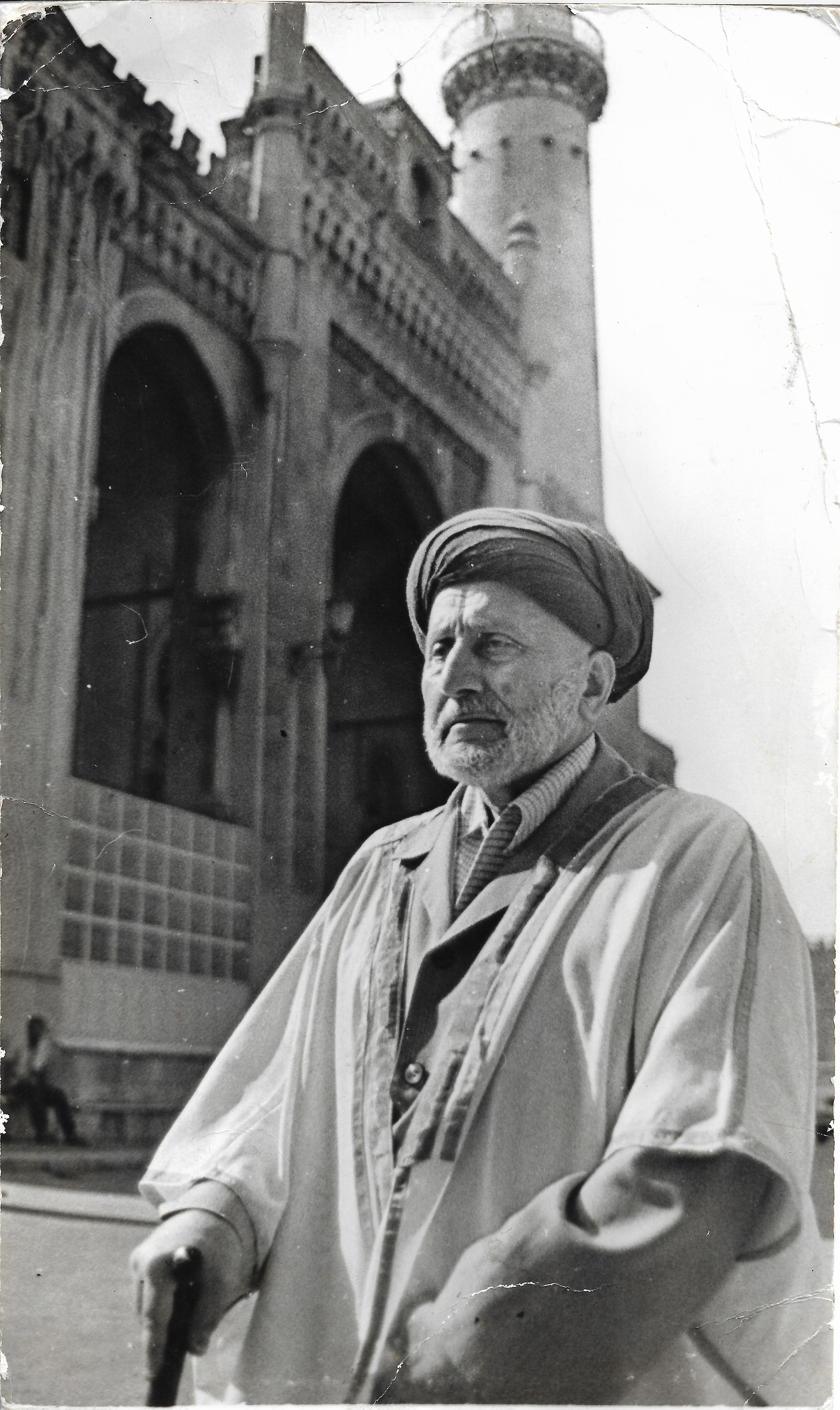
Haji Mir Gazanfar Ibrahimov at Taza Pir Mosque, Baku, 1979

In 1980, after suffering a serious injury (a fracture of the femoral neck), Ibrahimov resigned: in his own conviction, a Sheikh ul-Islam, whom the congregation follows, could not have moral or physical shortcomings. Although a Sheikh ul-Islam is not bound by strict doctrinal obligation to personally lead everyday religious rites, as spiritual leader of the Muslims of Transcaucasia he traditionally led the principal state-level Islamic prayers and ceremonies, during which worshippers lined up directly behind him and mirrored his movements in unison: standing (qiyam), bowing (ruku), and prostration (sujud). The injury he had sustained made it impossible to perform these movements cleanly and consistently, which became the concrete physical — not merely symbolic — reason for his resignation. He died on 3 November 1980. He was buried at the Yasamal Cemetery in Baku.

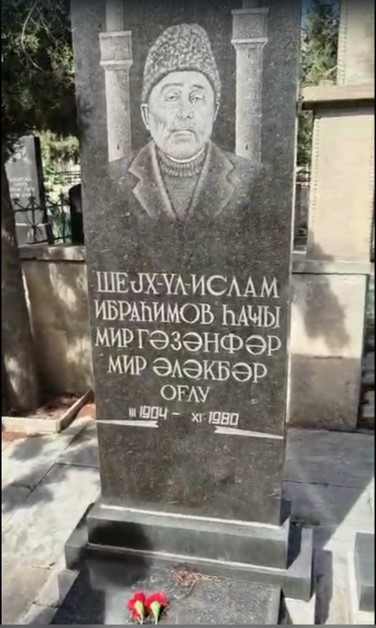
Gravestone of Haji Mir Gazanfar Ibrahimov, Yasamal Cemetery, Baku

== Legacy ==
During his years as akhund of the Goychay mosque (1968–1978), Ibrahimov provided spiritual leadership to the community, conducting services and instructing worshippers under the Soviet system of state control over religious organizations.

Ibrahimov led the Spiritual Board of the Muslims of Transcaucasia in 1978–1980, a period when religious organizations in the USSR operated under strict state control, and the international contacts of the clergy were used by the Soviet state as an element of foreign policy. Despite his comparatively short term of leadership, Ibrahimov ensured continuity of administration following the death of Sheikh ul-Islam Ali-Agha Suleymanzadeh and prepared the transition to the next generation of religious leaders.

In religious circles, Ibrahimov was known as a man who combined the traditional religious education he received at the madrasa in Mashhad with experience working in state organizations, which allowed him to interact both with religious communities and with organs of state control, such as the Council for Religious Affairs.

== Family ==
He was married to Asiya Ramazan gizi Ramazanova (10 May 1910 – 14 July 1991). Children:

1. Mir Ali Ibrahimov (1926–2000)
2. Mir Huseyn Ibrahimov (1928–1986)
3. Oktay Ibrahimov (1928–1996)
4. Mir Sohrab Ibrahimov (born 12 June 1943) – Minister of Light Industry of the Azerbaijan SSR, Permanent Representative of the Azerbaijan SSR to the Council of Ministers of the USSR in Moscow
5. Fatmakhanim Sadigova (née Ibrahimova; born 17 May 1945) – head of the department of scientific-technical information at the "Geophysics and Engineering Geology" production association of the State Oil Company of the Azerbaijan Republic (SOCAR), member of the National Committee of Azerbaijani Geophysicists, executive secretary of the journal Geophysical Innovations in Azerbaijan
6. Mir Saib Ibrahimov (5 October 1949 – 26 January 2020)

== See also ==
- Allahshukur Pashazadeh
- Religious Council of the Caucasus
