= Usubov =

Usubov or Usubova is a surname. Notable people with the surname include:

- Ibrahim bey Usubov (1872–1920), Azerbaijani Major General
- Ramil Usubov (born 1948), Azerbaijani politician
- Nigar Usubova (1914–1995), Azerbaijani teacher
