= Ali-Agha Suleymanzadeh =

Azerbaijani religious leader (1885–1977)

Personal life
- Born: 1885 village Novxanı in the Baku uezd, Baku Governorate of the Russian Empire
- Died: 1977 (aged 91–92) Baku, Azerbaijan Soviet Socialist Republic, Soviet Union
- Parent: Haji Suleyman (father)

Religious life
- Religion: Islam
- School: Shia

Muslim leader
- Post: Sheikh ul-Islam of the Caucasus
- Period in office: 1967—1978
- Predecessor: Mirmuhsin Hakimzadeh
- Successor: Mir Gazanfar Ibrahimov

Ali-Agha Suleymanzadeh (Azerbaijani: Axund Əliağa Süleymanzadə) — 10th Sheikh al-Islam, akhund and the chairman of the Religious Council of the Caucasus.

== Early life ==
Ali-Agha was born in the family of Haji Suleiman in 1885 in the village of Novxanı. He received his first education in a madrasah, studying the Quran, "Gulistan" and "Bustan" by the Saadi Shirazi. Seeing Ali's deep interest in religion, his future relative Akhund Haji Mohammed wants to send him with his son Aga-Mammed to the countries of the Near East to receive spiritual education. The expenses are covered by the elder brother of Ali-Agha — Agha-Mohammed. In 1902, two comrades first studied for some time in the Iranian province of Khorasan, then continued their studies in Iraq, in the city of Najaf. They passed the exam in Medina and completed their higher spiritual education after 12 years.

On the eve of returning to his homeland, Ali-agha's friend Aga-Mammed falls ill with a severe fever, and the prescribed treatment was useless. On his deathbed, he called Ali-agha to him and made a will:

— “You must return to your homeland, to Baku! Tell my father from me to bless me, let him light the hearth of his house with you. I am the only brother of my sisters in the family. In our house is my beloved unmarried sister Ummulbani. Let my father marry her to you!"[4]

== Career ==
Ali-Agha served as akhund in many mosques in Baku, constantly being under the control of the NKVD. After the death of the former Sheikh al-Islam Muhsin Hakimzadeh in 1966, the post of Sheikh al-Islam remained vacant for two years. In 1968, the IV Congress of the Muslims of Transcaucasia was convened. Ali-Agha Suleymanzadeh, who had worked as akhund of the Taza Pir Mosque for almost 20 years, was elected chairman at the age of 83.

In 1968—1978, he represented the country at many conferences and symposia, at the events of international organizations. In October 1970, an All-Union Conference was organized in the capital of Uzbekistan, Tashkent on the theme "The Importance of Unity and Cooperation in the Struggle for Peace", in which he took part and delivered a speech. In June 1977, he also participated in the All-Union Conference "The Clergy for Strong Peace, Disarmament and Just Relations between Nations" in Moscow.

He died in 1978, after him the place of Sheikh al-Islam was taken by Mirgazanfer Ibragimov.

== Family ==
Akhund Ali-Agha was married to Ummulbanu, daughter of Haji Muhammed, and had five children (1 son and 4 daughters).

== See also ==
- Mir Gazanfar Ibrahimov
- Saadi Shirazi
