= Orta Salahlı =

Orta Salahlı (Orta Salahly) may refer to:

- Orta Salahlı, Agstafa, Azerbaijan
- Orta Salahlı, Qazakh, Azerbaijan
