= Dzhil =

Dzhil may refer to:

- Jil, Armenia
- Cil, Azerbaijan
