= Muhsin Hakimzadeh =

Azerbaijani religious leader (1882–1967)

Personal life
- Born: 1882 Shamakhi in the Shemakha uezd, Baku Governorate of the Russian Empire
- Died: 1967 (aged 84–85) Baku, Azerbaijan Soviet Socialist Republic, Soviet Union
- Parent: Sheikh Ali (father)

Religious life
- Religion: Islam
- School: Shia

Muslim leader
- Post: Sheikh ul-Islam of the Caucasus
- Period in office: 1954–1967
- Predecessor: Agha-Alizadeh
- Successor: Ali-Agha Suleymanzadeh

Muhsin Hakimzadeh (Azerbaijani: Mirmöhsün Həkimzadə, 1882–1967) was the 9th Shaykh al-Islam and the chairman of the Religious Council of the Caucasus.

== Biography ==
=== Early years ===
Mirmuhsin was born in the family of sheikh Ali in 1882 in the city of Shamakhi. He received his first primary education in his father's house, later he was sent to the cities of Mashhad and Najaf to continue his education. After seven years of excellent education in Mashhad, he was awarded the title of akhund and then sheikh. After completing his education in 1914, Mirmukhsin Hakimzade returned to Shamakhi and became the closest assistant to his father.

By order of the Sheikh al-Islam of Transcaucasia he was appointed akhund of the Imamli mosque in the city of Shamakhi.

=== Soviet period ===
In 1928, inspections were carried out in the house of Mirmuhsin. His jewelry was confiscated and he himself was taken to Baku where he was kept in prison for 6 months, after which he was found not guilty and released, but his writings, which were taken with him in Baku were burned. After this incident Mirmuhsin permanently moved to Baku and began working as a laborer in some places, fleeing repression. After the establishment of the spiritual administration in 1943, akhunds who had escaped the repressions of 1937 were invited here, then akhund Mirmuhsin was elected deputy of the chairman of the Religious Council of the Caucasus.

=== Career ===
After the death of the past Sheikh al-Islam Agha-Alizadeh in 1954 a congress of the Spiritual Administration of Muslims of Transcaucasia was convened and sheikh Mirmuhsin Hakimzadeh, who had been in office for 12 years was elected chairman of it. During his tenure Hakimzade managed to open new mosques, build minarets in many mosques and build new madrasas.

He died on 15 September 1967, at the age of 85 in Baku and after him the post of Shaykh al-Islam was taken by Ali-Agha Suleymanzadeh.

== See also ==
- Ali-Agha Suleymanzadeh
- Shaykh al-Islam
