= Allahshukur Pashazade =

Azerbaijani Shaykh al-Islam (born 1949)

Shaykh al-Islām Allashukur Pashazade
- Allahşükür Paşazadə
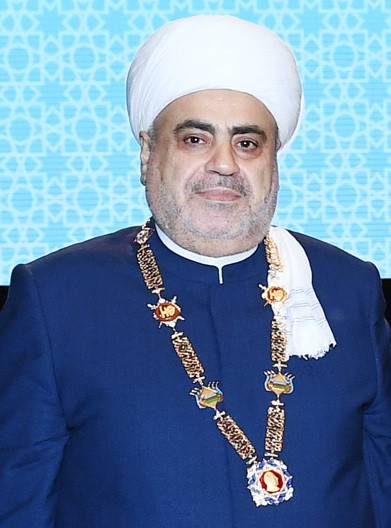
- Pashazade in 2019
- Title: Sheikh ul-Islam and Grand Mufti of the Caucasus

Personal life
- Born: August 26, 1949 (age 76) Cil, Lankaran Rayon, Azerbaijan SSR, Soviet Union
- Education: Mir-i Arab Madrassah and National University of Uzbekistan

Religious life
- Religion: Islam
- Denomination: Shia
- School: Twelver
- Jurisprudence: Ja'fari
- Creed: Usuli

Muslim leader
- Based in: Baku, Azerbaijan
- Post: Shaykh al-Islam of the Caucasus
- Period in office: 1980–present
- Predecessor: Haji Mir Gazanfar Mir Alekper oglu Ibrahimov
- Successor: Incumbent

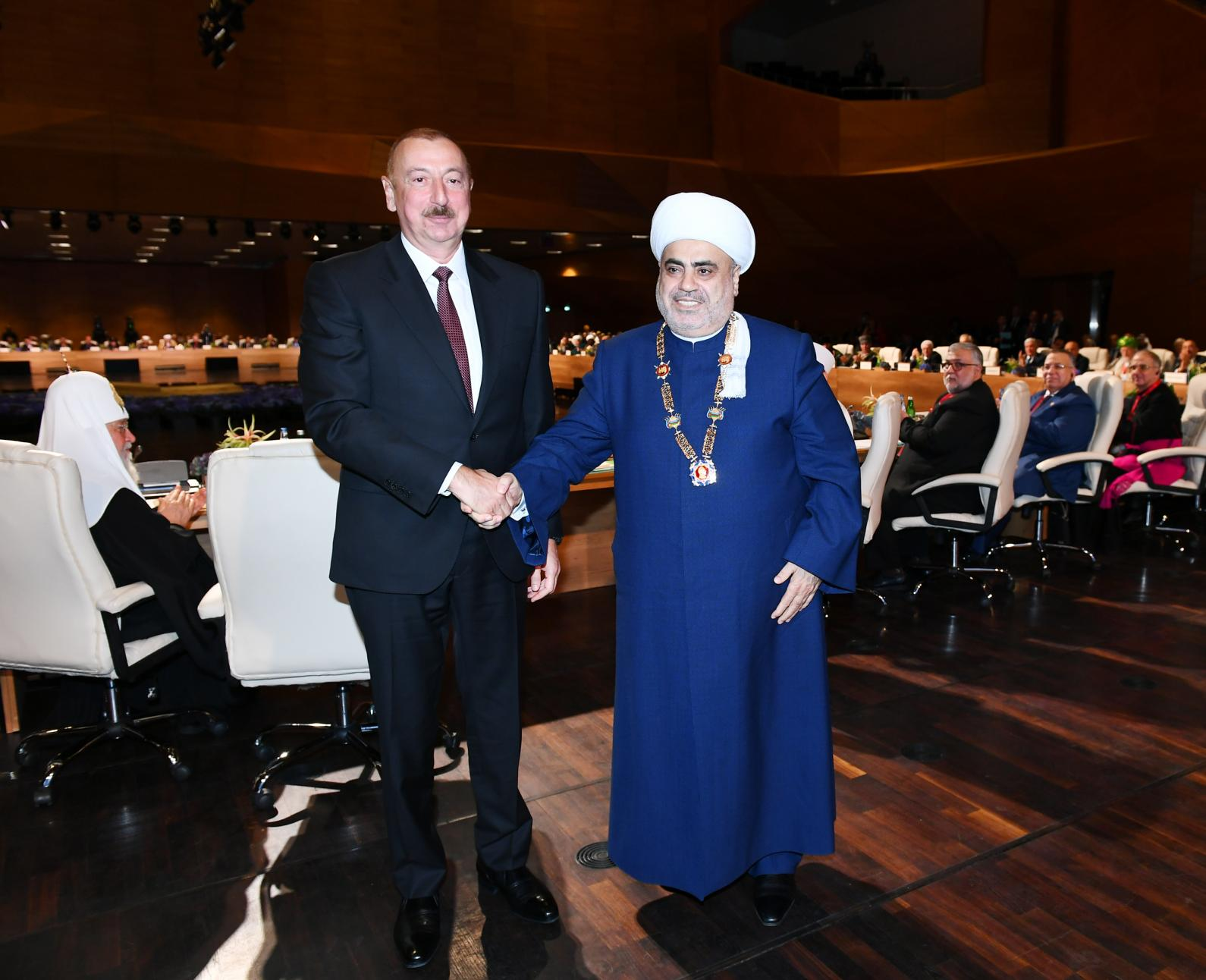
Pashazade with President Aliyev in 2019

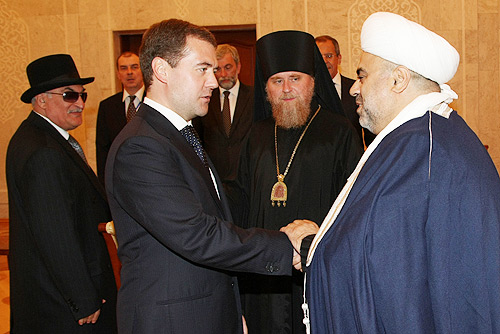
Pashazade with Dmitry Medvedev in Baku, July 2008.

Allahshukur Hummat Pashazade (Note: Azerbaijani: Allahşükür Hümmət Paşazadə) (born 26 August 1949) is the Shaykh al-Islam of the Caucasus which includes the Republic of Azerbaijan, the Republic of Georgia, and Dagestan, Kabardino-Balkaria, Ingushetia, Chechnya, Karachay–Cherkessia, and Adygea in the Russian Federation. He is also the chairman of the Religious Council of the Caucasus.

== Biography ==
Pashazade was born in Cil, Lankaran Rayon, Azerbaijan Soviet Socialist Republic (today the Republic of Azerbaijan) on August 26, 1949. He got his primary religious education in the city of Lankaran. In 1968 he went to the Uzbekistan Soviet Socialist Republic (today the independent Republic of Uzbekistan) where he entered the Mir-i-Arab Madrasah in Bukhara and later relocated to Tashkent where he finished his religious education in Tashkent State University in 1975.

He returned to Azerbaijan in 1975 and became the acting secretary of the Caucasian Muslims Office, and Akhund and deputy chief of the Taza Pir Mosque in the Azerbaijani capital Baku. In 1980 he was elected chairman of the Spiritual Administration of the Muslims of Transcaucasia and became Sheikh ul-Islam. After the collapse and dissolution of the Soviet Union and independence of Azerbaijan, in 1992, he was elected chairman of the Supreme Religious Board of Caucasian peoples of Azerbaijan, Georgia, Dagestan, Kabardino-Balkaria, Ingushetia, Chechnya, Karachay-Cherkessia, and Adygea.

Pashazade is a member of the Management Board of World Islamic Congress and the Management Board of Eurasia Islamic Council, among a number of other international organizations. He was elected co-chair of CIS Interreligious Council in 2004.

On November 21, 2009, he was included in a book called 500 Most Influential Muslims of World.

== Honors, awards, and decorations ==
In 1986, he was elected a member of Royal Academy of Jordan.

- “Lenin Order of Friendship Among the Peoples” (1988, USSR)
- “Al-elm va amal” Order (1992, Egypt)
- “Order of Glory” (1994, Egypt)
- “First Rank Order of Independence” (1999, Azerbaijan)
- “Order of St. Vladimir, First class” (2001, Russian Orthodox Church)
- “Order of the Golden Fleece” (2009, Georgia)

== See also ==
- State Committee for Work with Religious Organizations of Azerbaijan Republic
- Islam in Azerbaijan
