= Abdul Hamid Efendizadeh =

Mufti Abdul Hamid Efendizadeh
- Title: Mufti of the Caucasus

Personal life
- Born: 15 April 1812 Shamakhi, Shirvan Khanate
- Died: 10 December 1880 Tbilisi in the Tiflis uezd, Tiflis Governorate of the Russian Empire

Religious life
- Religion: Islam
- School: Sunni

Muslim leader
- Predecessor: Muhammed Muftizadeh
- Successor: Mirza Huseyn Afandi Qayibov

Abdul Hamid Efendizadeh (Azerbaijani: Əbdülhəmid Əfəndizadə) 15 April 1812 - 10 December 1880 (aged 68 years) was the 4th Mufti of the Religious Council of the Caucasus.

== Biography ==
He was born on April 15, 1812, in the city of Shamakhi. He started studying at the age of 10, and after graduating from school at the age of 17, he entered the Shamakhi madrasah, which was led by his uncle Haji-Ali Efendizade, where he learned oriental languages.

After graduating from the madrasah of A. Efendizade, Abdul began working with his uncle and gradually gained fame in the field of education. On the advice of his uncle, he was hired in a public school, opened on February 22, 1849, at the initiative of the viceroy of the Caucasus M. Vorontsov, where he served as a Sharia teacher. When Abdul Hamid worked at the school, he taught students French, in addition to Azerbaijani, Persian and Arabic languages. Later, the public school where he worked was closed for certain reasons.

In the early 1860s, he visited Mecca and earned the title of haji. On January 16, 1864, he was appointed chairman and manager of the Shamakhi spiritual department, where he was later awarded for his work by the viceroy of the Caucasus with two gold watches, a gold bowl for tobacco and a diamond ring. In early December 1872, Efendizadeh was appointed chairman and mufti of the Transcaucasian Akhli-Tassan administration, and in connection with the new position he moved from Shamakhi to the capital of Georgia, Tbilisi.

As a religious figure, Efendizadeh showed great activity and philological competence in translating religious literature, religious decrees and charters from Arabic into Azerbaijani, together with the poet Seyid Unsizade. In connection with the appointment after moving to Tbilisi, the number of his friends increases. Among them, Sheikh al-Islam Ahmed Huseynzade, writer Mirza Akhundov, Adolf Berger, a graduate of the Faculty of Oriental Languages of St. Petersburg University, Mirza Huseyn Gaibzadeh, who took an active part in collecting samples of Azerbaijani literature and publishing them in Germany, they were Efendizadeh's closest friends.

Among other things, he was a supporter of changing the Arabic alphabet. He was the one who wrote a positive review of the treatise "Rushtiya", compiled by Mirza Reza Khan Danish in 1878 on behalf of Sheikh al-Islam Ahmad Huseinzadeh (newspaper "Ziyai-Kafgasiyya", 01.05.1881, N3). Efendizade wrote about this:

— “I have read the Rushtiya treatise (written by you) and its contents from cover to cover. I didn't find a flaw. The alphabet invented by you is perfect and better than the alphabet invented by others..."[3]

Abdul Hamid devoted the last six years of his life to compiling a Russian-Azerbaijani dictionary, but he could not publish his work. Sultan Majid Ganizadeh, close to the Efendizadeh family, continued the unfinished business of his compatriot while studying at the Alexandria Teachers' Institute in Tbilisi.

On December 24, 1881, in the fourth issue of the Ziyai-Kafgasiyya newspaper, readers received a message about the death of Efendizade. He died on December 10, 1880, in Tbilisi and after him, the post of Mufti was taken by Mirza Hussein Gaibzade.

== See also ==
- Mirza Huseyn Afandi Qayibov
- Ahmad Huseinzadeh
- Azerbaijani literature
