= Agha-Alizadeh =

Agha Alizadeh
- Ağa Cavad oğlu Əlizadə
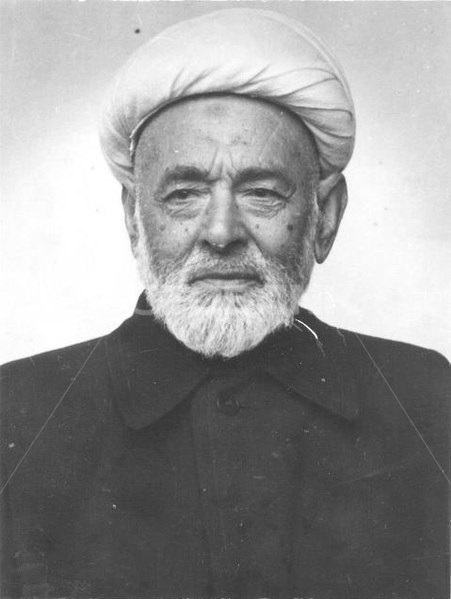
- Akhund Agha Alizadeh, the first Shaykh al-Islam of the Azerbaijan Democratic Republic

Personal life
- Born: October 22, 1871 Pirshagi village in the Baku, Baku Governorate of the Russian Empire
- Died: 1954 (aged 82–83) Baku, Azerbaijan Soviet Socialist Republic, Soviet Union
- Parent: Haji Muhammad Javad (father)

Religious life
- Religion: Islam
- Denomination: Shia
- School: Usuli
- Sect: Twelver
- Jurisprudence: Ja'fari

Muslim leader
- Post: Sheikh ul-Islam of the Caucasus
- Period in office: 1918–1929 and 1944–1954
- Predecessor: Mahammad Pishnamazzadeh
- Successor: Muhsin Hakimzadeh

Agha Alizadeh (Azerbaijani: Ağa Cavad oğlu Əlizadə) was the 8th Sheikh ul-Islam of the Religious Council of the Caucasus and the first Sheikh al-Islam of the Azerbaijan Democratic Republic (1918–1920).

== Early years ==
He was born on 22 October 1871, in the village of Pirshagi in the city of Baku in the spiritual family of Haji Muhammad Javad, who was one of the famous religious figures of his time. In his youth, Agha-Alizadeh was sent to Baghdad to receive a religious education, after which he went to study at the highest religious university in Najaf.

== Career ==
In 1896, at the age of 25, having successfully completed his studies at the spiritual university in Najaf and having earned the title of akhund, Agha Alizade returned to his homeland and was assigned to one of the mosques in the Old City. In 1903, at the age of 32, he was appointed akhund of the Taza Pir Mosque.

In 1904 he was elected a member of the Shia Spiritual Board of Muslims of the Caucasus. In the summer of 1907, Agha Alizade founded the "Saadat Muslim Spiritual Society" in Baku and was elected its chairman. Journalist Najaf bey Vazirov, philanthropists Isa bey Ashurbekov, Zeynalabdin Taghiyev and other figures actively participated in the activities of the society.

=== First term ===
In 1918, by order of the Special Minister of Social Security Musa bey Rafiyev, Agha-Alizadeh was appointed shaykh al-Islam while his father Haji Javad was the chairman of the religious council of the Baku Governorate. In 1918, like his predecessor Pishnamazzadeh he demanded that the leaders of the Mashikhat organization be paid at the ministerial level and that the number of members of the central apparatus be increased to 15, but received no answer. Akhund Agha Alizadeh was in his first term as shaykh al-Islam until 12 May 1920.

=== Second term ===
In 1943, by decision of the Presidium of the Supreme Soviet of the USSR the Caucasian Muslims Board, whose activities were terminated in 1920 was restored and Agha Alizadeh was elected to the post of chairman of the Board. On 25 May 1944, the first congress of the Caucasian Muslims Board was convened where in the course of a vote held on 28 May 1944, akhund Agha Alizadeh was again re-elected shaykh al-Islam of the Caucasus.

Agha Alizadeh also participated in conferences organized in many countries of the world, spoke on behalf of Soviet Muslims. In 1952, for the first time after the war in the USSR he participated in a conference on the Defense of Peace in the city of Zagorsk and in May 1952 he participated in a conference organized at the Congress for the Defense of Peace, held in Vienna.

Agha Alizadeh died in Baku in December 1954 at the age of 84.

== See also ==
- Religious Council of the Caucasus
- Islam in the Soviet Union
