= Janab =

Islamic honorary title

Janab, Janaab or Janob (Arabic: الجناب; Persian: جناب) is an Islamic honorary title, which means "Sir" in English. The title has been carried by many Islamic poets and writers. The compound style Janab-e-Ashraf (جنابِ اشرف; janāb-i ashraf - literal meaning "the Field of Honour", Ashraf being a provincial aristocrat) was borne by prime ministers and can be translated as His Serene Highness.

In the Arabic-speaking Middle East, it is used as a way of addressing certain high officials or someone very respectful, also even as a polite title added after a man's surname or used as the plural for Mister before a list of men's names. It literally also used and means "(the) Right Honourable" or "Esquire". It also has the same meaning in Bengali, Urdu and Hindi.

At the court of Persia's Shahanshahs of the imperial Qajar dynasty, precedence for non-members of the dynasty was organized in eight protocollary classes, generally coupled to various offices and qualities; the highest of these, styled Nawab, was usually reserved for princes, while the six classes were awarded to various ministers, officers, commanders, Muslim clergy and so on. Ranking only below Nawab and Shakhs-i-Awwal (usually present and former Prime Ministers), Janab was the style borne by senior Ministers of State, high ranking clergy.

== See also ==
- Allamah
- Akhand (surname)
