= Mahammad Hasan Movlazadeh Shakavi =

Azerbaijani cleric and scholar (1854–1932)

Sheikh ul-Islam Marja' Allamah Mahammad Hasan Ismayil oghlu Mövlazadeh Shakavi
- Məhəmməd Həsən İsmayıl oğlu Mövlazadə Şəkəvi
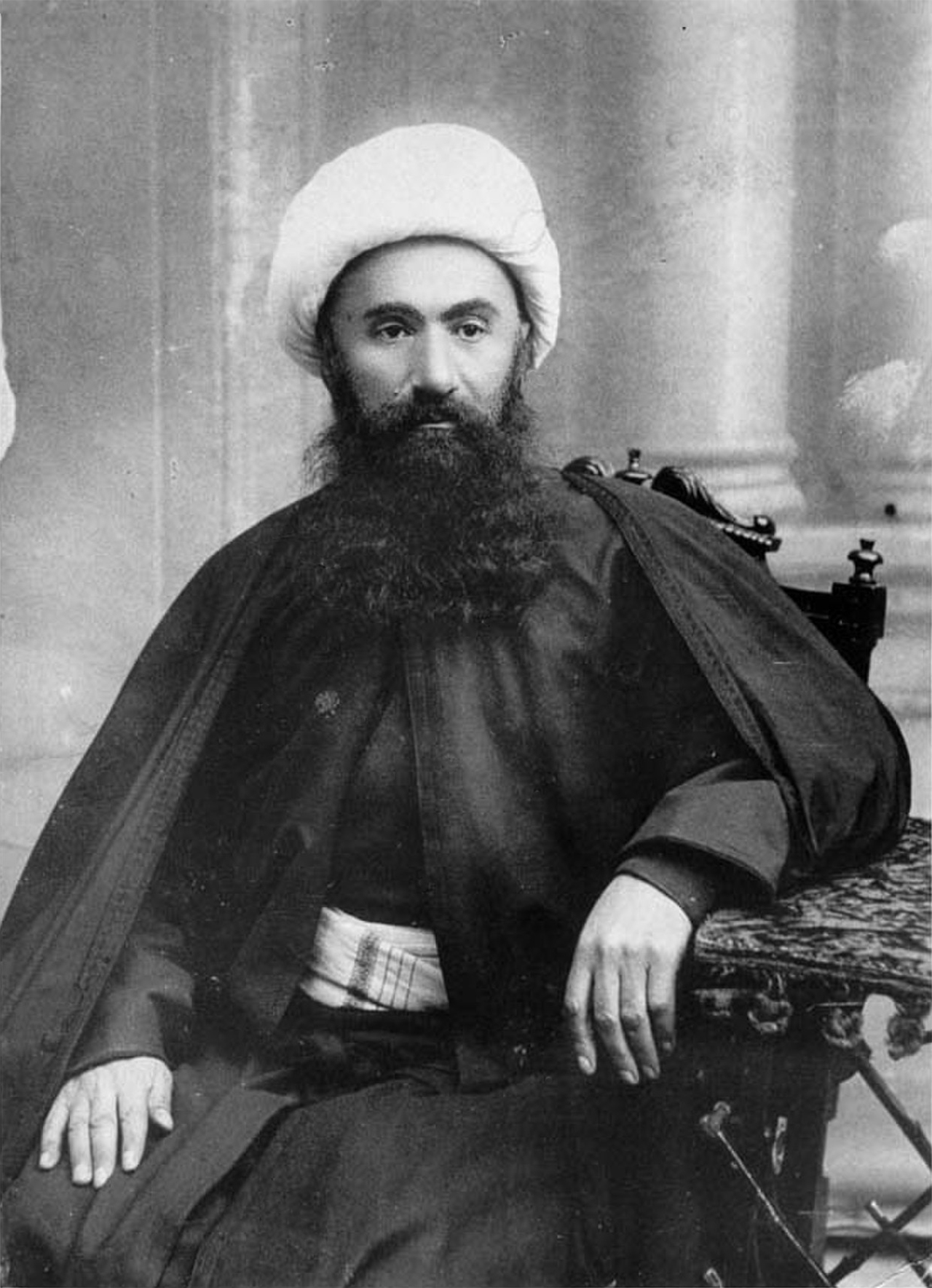
- Mahammad Hasan Shakavi Movlazadeh, early 20th century
- Title: Sixth Sheikh ul-Islam of the Caucasus

Personal life
- Born: 1854 Shaki, Russian Empire (present-day Azerbaijan)
- Died: 1932 (aged 77–78) Tbilisi, Georgian SSR (present-day Georgia)
- Resting place: Tbilisi Muslim Cemetery (now within the Tbilisi Botanical Garden)
- Home town: Shaki, present-day Azerbaijan
- Notable work(s): Kitab al-Bayan fi Tafsir al-Qur'an (1908, two volumes, republished in Baku in 1990)
- Education: Shaki mollakhana, Ganja Madrasa, advanced religious studies in Iraq, including Najaf

Religious life
- Religion: Islam
- Denomination: Shia
- Institute: Spiritual Board of Transcaucasian Muslims
- School: Usuli
- Sect: Twelver Shi'ism
- Jurisprudence: Ja'fari
- Profession: Islamic scholar, Islamic jurist, Qur'anic exegete, translator, teacher, qadi, mullah, author

Muslim leader
- Based in: Tbilisi, Russian Empire
- Post: Sheikh ul-Islam of the Caucasus, Shi'ite marjaʿ
- Period in office: 1907–1909 (acting from 1907, elected in 1908)
- Predecessor: Abdussalam Akhundzadeh
- Successor: Mahammad Pishnamazzadeh
- Previous post: Mullah at Ganja Jum'a Mosque, teacher of Shari'ah and Fiqh at the Tiflis Muslim Religious School, qadi of Jabrayil, Ganja, Tiflis and Kutaisi

Mahammad Hasan Ismayil oghlu Mövlazadeh Shakavi (Azerbaijani: محمد حسن اسماعیل اوغلی مولازاده شکوی, Məhəmməd Həsən İsmayıl oğlu Mövlazadə Şəkəvi) was an Azerbaijani marja' who served as the sixth Sheikh ul-Islam (Islamic Leader) of the Caucasus. He the first Islamic scholar to translate the Quran into the Azerbaijani language and the last Marja' native to North Azerbaijan.

== Early life ==
Mahammad Hasan was born in 1854. He received his first religious education at Shaki mollakhane, which he later continued at Ganja Madrasa. After graduation from madrasah he served for a few years as mullah (mosque leaders) of Ganja Jum'a mosque. He later decided to continue his education and for this purpose traveled to Iraq where he advanced his degree in religion studies.

== Career ==
In 1891 he returned to the Caucasus and published the first joint Hijri and Gregorian calendars in Persian.

In 1893 Mahammad Hasan Movlazada started teaching Islamic religious law (Shari'at and Fiqh) at Tiflis Muslim Religious Scholl. He later served as qadi of Jabrayil, Ganja, Tiflis and Kutaisi regions.

In 1908 Mahammad Hasan Movlazada had been elected as the sixth Sheikh ul-Islam of Muslims of the Caucasus.

In 1908 in Tiflis he publishes Kitab al-bayan fi tafsir al-Quran - the two-volume edition of Koran's translation and tafsir (commentary). This work has been re-published in Baku in 1990.

Movlazada Mahammad Hasan Ismayil oglu Shakavi died in 1932 in Tbilisi.

== Works and translations ==
In addition to his Qur'anic commentary, Movlazadeh translated into Azerbaijani the covenant that Ali ibn Abi Talib addressed to Malik al-Ashtar, his governor in Egypt. The translation was published in Tiflis in 1910. He also wrote Tarikh-i muqaddasi: Anbiya ahvalati ("Sacred History: Accounts of the Prophets"), published in Tiflis in 1913, and translated Nasuh Hasan's two-volume geographical work Tərcümeyi-Töhfeyi-Nəsuhiyyə, published in Baku in 1904.

A study of Azerbaijani Qur'anic commentators classifies Kitab al-Bayan fi Tafsir al-Qur'an among works that use both transmitted reports (riwāya) and reasoned interpretation (dirāya).
