= Mahammad Pishnamazzadeh =

Sheikh ul-Islam Akhund Mahammad Pishnamazzadeh
- Məhəmməd Pişnamazzadə
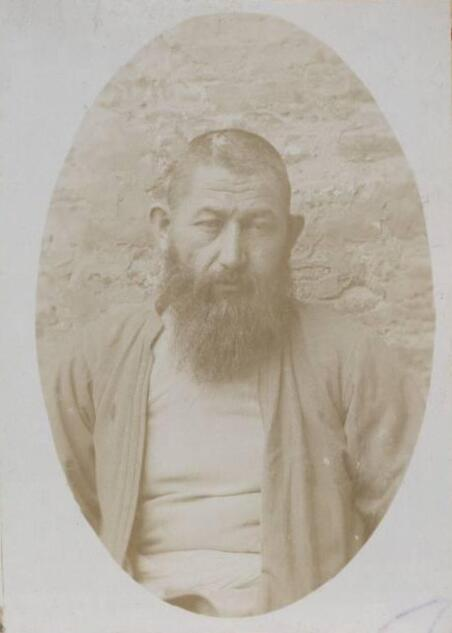
- Mug shots of Mahammad Pishnamazzadeh
- Title: Seventh Sheikh ul-Islam of the Caucasus

Personal life
- Born: May 15, 1853 Ganja, Russian Empire
- Died: 1937 (aged 83–84) Ganja, Azerbaijan SSR
- Resting place: Ganja, Azerbaijan SSR

Religious life
- Religion: Islam
- Denomination: Shia
- School: Usuli
- Sect: Twelver
- Jurisprudence: Ja'fari

Muslim leader
- Based in: Tbilisi, Russian Empire
- Post: Sheikh ul-Islam of the Caucasus
- Period in office: 14 January 1915 – 10 December 1918
- Predecessor: Mahammad Hasan Movlazadeh Shakavi
- Successor: Agha-Alizadeh

Akhund Mahammad Pishnamazzadeh (Azerbaijani: آخوند محمدعلی پیشنماززاده, Axund Məhəmməd Pişnamazzadə) was the seventh Sheikh ul-Islam of the Caucasus (1910-1918).

== Early life ==
He was born on 5 May 1853, in a clerical family in Ganja. He received his education in Tabriz. He was acknowledged as akhund in 1883. In 1890, he was accused of treason and banished to Turkestan along with 37 people but was pardoned in 1892. Same year he was appointed as akhund of Ganja Juma Mosque and elected as member to Tbilisi Regional Spiritual Council next year. He was head of Ganja Regional Spiritual Council as of 1895. In 1906, he was found guilty of being a member of the Difai Party and banished to Kazan. Returning from banishment, he was elected as "acting" Sheikh ul-Islam of the Caucasus on 20 July 1909. He met with Tzar Nicholas II of Russia in 1914 during official visit to Tbilisi.

== Later life ==
He was acknowledged as official Sheikh ul-Islam of the Caucasus in 1915 by tzar. He resigned office on 10 December 1918 and continued to be akhund of Ganja Juma Mosque. He died in 1937 during Great Purge.

== See also ==
- Mirza Abu Turab Akhundzade
