= Ahmad-Jabir Ahmadov =

Azerbaijani academic

- Born: February 6, 1942; Shaki, Azeri SSR, Soviet Union
- Died: 8 March 2021 (aged 79); Baku, Azerbaijan
- Occupations: Sphere of science: "Commodity research and examination of food"
- Father: Ismail Ahmedov

Ahmad-Jabir Ismayil oghlu Ahmadov (Azerbaijani: Əhməd-Cabir İsmayıl oğlu Əhmədov) – was a professor of "Commodity research and examination of food" in Azerbaijan State Economic University, Doctor of Philosophy in technical sciences (1973), Professor of the department "Commodity research of Foodstuffs" (2001), Honored Teacher of Azerbaijan (2002), a member of the Union of Azerbaijani Writers and Union of Journalists of Azerbaijan, Golden Pen Media award winner (2010). Author of over 300 scientific publications, including 60 books.

== Biography ==
Ahmad-Jabir Ismayil oghlu Ahmadov was born on February 6, 1942, in the city of Shaki, Azerbaijan Republic. After finishing secondary school No. 2 (1958) he was admitted to the Baku School of Trade and Cookery apprenticeship, where he got the qualification of confectioner of the seventh grade. From November 1961 till August 1964 he served military service in the Soviet Army.

Before entering into University (1964) he had worked as a confectioner in Shaki regional food service-shop (from March 1960 till November 1961) and as a cooker in a military sanatorium. In 1968 he graduated with honors from university, majoring in the Commodity Research of Foodstuff. From December 1968 till December 1971 he pursued post-graduate studies dedicated to the field of study with his professional experience. In 1973 he defended his Ph.D. thesis "Study of commodity research of characteristics of saffron, growing in the Azerbaijan SSR" and received his Ph.D. in Technical Sciences.

Since 1978 he has been working as an associated professor of the department "Commodity research of Foodstuffs". During his work in the university he held the positions of deputy dean at "Science of Commodity" faculty (1977–1983), was elected and worked as a dean of "Science of Commodity" faculty (1984–1987), four times as a head of the department of "Commodity research of foodstuffs" (1983–1984,1989–2001, 2006–2011 years). In June 2001 by the decision of the Academic Board of the "Azerbaijan State Economic University" he was awarded the academic degree of the professor of the department "Commodity research of Foodstuffs".

Ahmadov Ahmad-Jabir made the Hajj – the pilgrimage to the holy places of Mecca on 21 December 2006. Ahmadov Ahmad-Jabir has two sons and five grandchildren.

== Activities ==
He has more than 355 research works, including 44 books, 12 textbooks, 17 manuals and more than 50 teaching methodical works in foodstuffs for students majoring in the "Commodity research of foodstuffs". As a theorist and practitioner in the branch of Technology of foodstuff production, he has written a number of books in technology of confectionery and bakery products, books and albums dedicated to the Azerbaijan cookery, books on tinned foodstuffs, alcoholic and non-alcoholic beverages, spices as well as on edible fats and dairy products. He published 72 articles in 10 chapters of the Azerbaijan Soviet Encyclopedia on separate groups of foodstuffs.

He was awarded the honorary title "Honored Teacher" by decree of the President of Azerbaijan Republic Heydar Aliyev in June 2002. From 2001 he is a member of "Union of Journalists of Azerbaijan". At present he is Professor of the department of "Commodity Research of Foodstuffs" in Azerbaijan State Economic University.

He has been working as advisor in “Azersun Holding" company since 2003. A. Ahmadov was awarded with the Media Award "Golden Pen" on 5 June 2010.

The book album "Azerbaijan Cookery" was distributed to more than 15 foreign countries and was published in Turkey. The book "Encyclopedia of Azerbaijan Cuisine" was submitted for publication in the first quarter of 2012.

== List of books written by Ahmad-Jabir Ahmadov ==
=== Textbooks ===
1. "Tamlı malların əmtəəşünaslığı" (1993)
2. "Ərzaq malları əmtəəşünaslığı" (1996)
3. "Yeyinti yağları, süd və süd məhsullarının ekspertizası" (2002)
4. "Bitki mənşəli məhsulların ekspertizası" (2005)
5. "Heyvanat mənşəli məhsulların ekspertizası" (2005)
6. "Ərzaq malları əmtəəşünaslığı" (2-ci nəşri – 2006)
7. "Meyvə – tərəvəzin əmtəəşünaslığı" (2009)
8. "Qənnadı malların əmtəəşünaslığı" (2010)
9. "Tamlı malların əmtəəşünaslığı" (2-ci nəşri – 2010)
10. "Ərzaq malları əmtəəşünaslığı" (3-cü nəşri – 2012)
11. "Ərzaq məhsullarının konservləşdirilməsi" (2017)

=== Monographs ===
1. "Ədviyyələr, qatmalar" (1998)
2. "Azərbaycan üzümündən qidalı məhsullar" (2009)
3. "Ədviyyələr və tamlı qatmalar" (2009)
4. "Azərbaycan çayı" (2010)
5. "Azərbaycan çörəyi" (2010)
6. "Qurani-Kərimdə qida məhsulları və islamda qidalanma" (2013, 2015)
7. "Yeyilən bitkilərin müalicəvi xassələri" (2014)
8. "Milli Azərbaycan şərbətləri və sərinləşdirici içkilər" (2014)
9. "Zeytun və Zeytun yağı" (2015)
10. "Susuz Həyat Yoxdur" (2018)

=== Non-fiction books ===
1. "Azərbaycan kulinariyası" (на азербайджанском, русском, английском яз.) (1987, 1990, 1997)
2. "1001 şirniyyat" (1993)
3. "Dadlı və ləzzətli xörəklərin sirri" (1995)
4. "Evdə konservləşdirmə" (1996, 2010)
5. "Azərbaycan kulinariyasının inciləri" (1997)
6. "Müasir Azərbaycan mətbəxinin xörəkləri" (2006)
7. "Блюда современной азербайджанской кухни" (rus dilində) (2006)
8. "Азербайджанская кухня" (rus dilində) (2008)
9. "1002 şirniyyat" (2010)
10. "Tortların hazırlanması" (2010)
11. "Novruz süfrəsi" (2011)
12. "Azərbaycan mətbəx ensiklopediyası" (2011)
13. "Ərzaq mallarının adları" (Azərbaycan, rus və ingilis dillərində) (2012)

=== Publicist books ===
1. "Həcc ziyarətində" (2007)
2. "Hacı İsmayıl – 100" (2007)
3. "50 il əmək cəbhəsində" (2008)
4. "Yaddaşlarda iz qalanda…" (2012)
5. "Elmi-pedaqoji fəaliyyət – 70" (2012)

== Links ==
- http://unec.edu.az/prof-ehmedov-ehmed-cabir-ismayil-oglu/
- http://anl.az/el/alf7/alf7(2).php
- http://library.unec.edu.az/2014-05-07-15-29-39/tdvi?view=author&id=6%5B%5D
