= Ismail Ahmedov =

10th Mufti of the Religious Council of the Caucasus

Mufti Ismail Ahmedov
- Title: Mufti of the Caucasus

Personal life
- Born: November 27, 1907 Shaki, Nukha uezd, Elizavetpol Governorate of the Russian Empire
- Died: February 18, 1986 (aged 78) Baku, Azerbaijan SSR, USSR
- Children: Ahmed-Kamal, Ahmad-Jabir Ahmadov, Ahmed-Jamal, Niyazi Ahmadov, Sedaqet, Kifayet, Nezaket, Nehayet
- Parent: Haji Kadyr (father)

Religious life
- Religion: Islam
- School: Sunni

Muslim leader
- Successor: Salman Musayev

Ismail Ahmedov (Note: Azerbaijani: İsmayıl Əhmədov) (1907–1986) was the 10th Mufti of the Religious Council of the Caucasus.

== Personal life ==
Ismail Akhmedov was born on 27 November 1907 in Shaki. In 1916-1918, he studied at the Shaki elementary school, then at the city school and in 1923-1930 he studied at the madrasa. He married in 1936.

== Career ==
On June 23, 1941, he was drafted into the army from the Nukha military commissariat for the World War II. He was awarded the medal "For the Defence of Stalingrad" and the medal "For Military Merit".

From 1945 to 1967 he worked as a hairdresser in the Nukha consumer services complex then moved to Baku and worked as a mullah in the Haji Azhdarbey mosque (Blue mosque) for almost two years.

In May 1969, Haji Ismail Ahmedov was elected deputy of the chairman (mufti) of the Caucasus Muslims Board. The new mufti, who did not have a higher religious education was known for his moderation and loyalty to the state. He was not very eager to preach, but thanks to his pleasant attitude he was able to win the sympathy of the Sunni believers.

In 1970 and 1973 mufti Ismail Ahmedov visited Mecca. He traveled to a number of foreign countries and participated in many high Muslim meetings and peace conferences.

== Death and legacy ==
He died on February 18, 1986, at the age of 78 in Baku. After his death, the position remained vacant until 1989. An ode called Ramadan, which he wrote in 1932, was published after his death.
