= Turban knocking =

Removing a Shia mullah's turban as protest

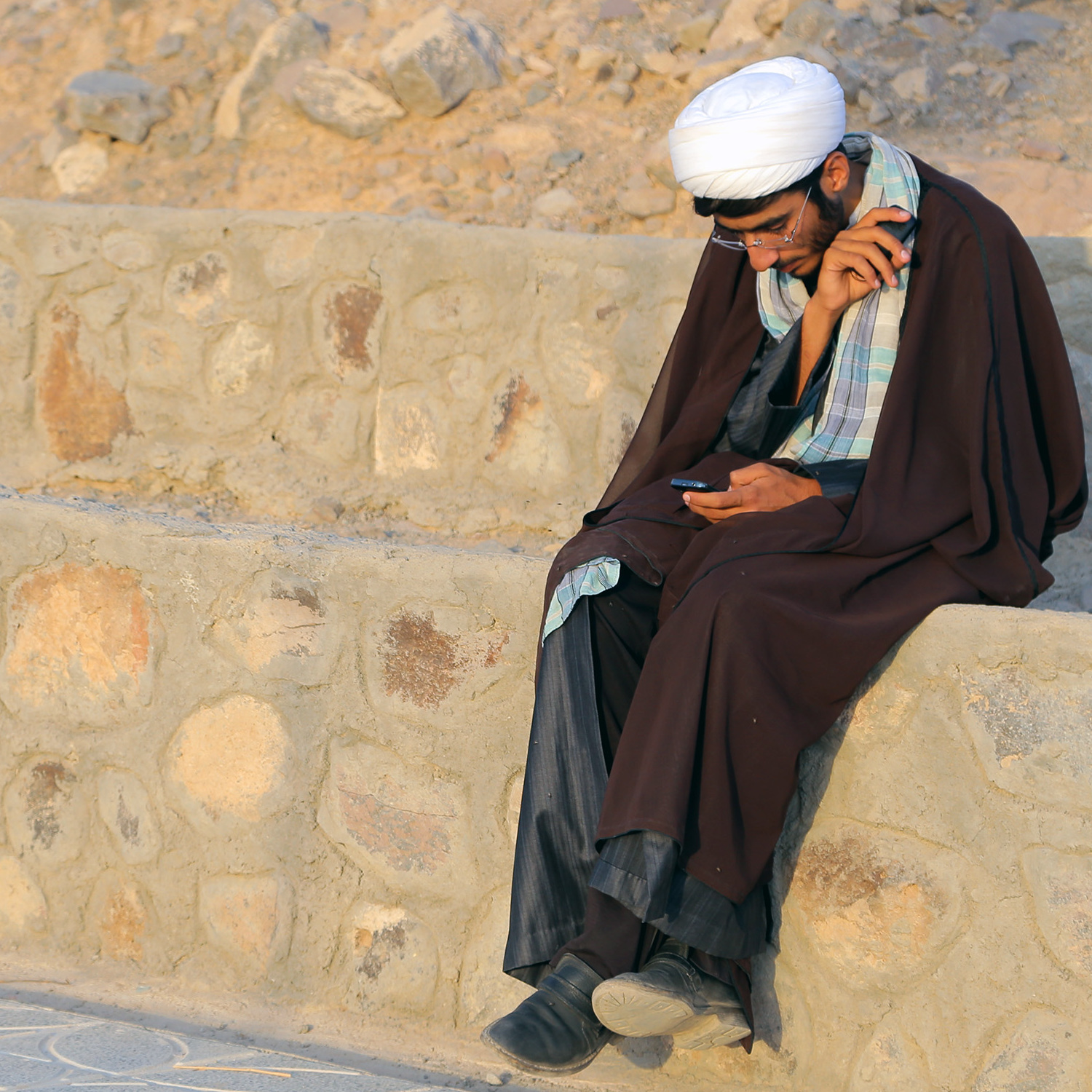
A Shiite mullah with a turban on his head

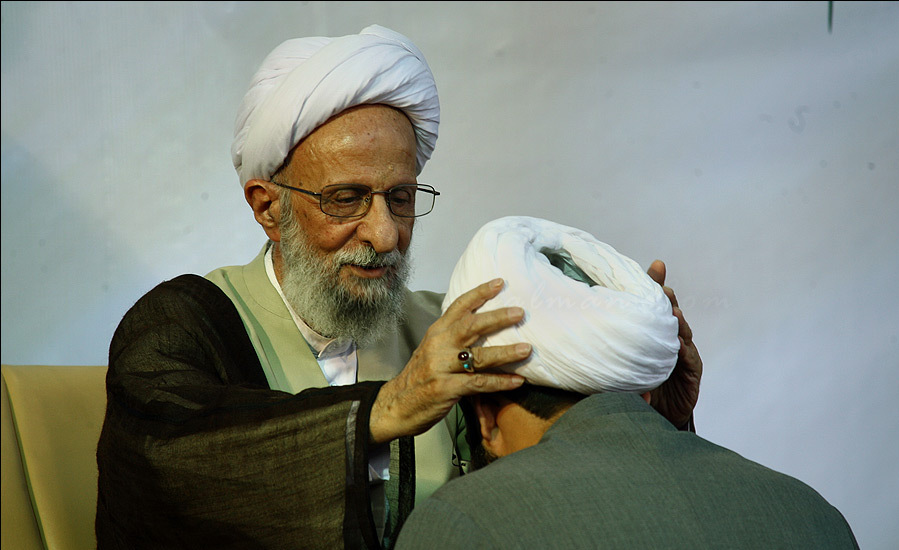
Mesbah Yazdi, as a high level mullah, bestows a turban to a new mullah in the "Ceremony of Putting on a Turban".

Ammāmeparāni (Persian:عمامه‌پرانی; "turban throwing", "knocking off the turban"), often referred to as turban knocking in English, is a hate crime in which people knock or throw the turban off the head of a mullah (Persian: Akhund) in order to insult the Shia clergy. The action is normally done via the protester running past the subject and knocking the headdress while continuing to run off to avoid capture. During the Mahsa Amini protests in Iran of 2022, people would take videos doing this action, publishing them on social media, resulting in a brief popularization of the protest method.

Turban knocking soon came to be seen as an expression of women’s resistance to the clerical establishment, with women who premeditated the act doing so while lacking a hair covering – an act punishable by law. Engaging in this illegal act, was, however, purposeful, as well as holding precedent. Combining these two forms of protest, as simply as the act of a woman refusing to cover their hair, serves three purposes, amongst others. First is acting as an expression of refusal to cooperate with Iranian theocratic law. Second is acting as an expression of civil disobedience towards the Iranian Morality Police, who during the Mahsa Amini protests were a primary target of the goals of the protesters. Third is acting to increase attention to the protests, indicate the existence of civil discontent, and promote engagement and topical virality, by engaging in such a contextually politically, religiously, and socially controversial act, and consequently angering sympathizers of the status quo.

Qaba (Qabā; Persian: عبا) and Ammame (Arabic: عمامة `emãmah) are clothes of Muslim clergy and some believe that this dress is the dress of the Prophet of Islam and should be respected.

== History ==
Ammameparani occurred for the first time in contemporary history of Iran during the Triumph of Tehran in 1909 of the Constitutional Revolution, when Yusuf-Khan threw the turban of Sheikh Fazlullah Nouri to protesting crowd.

Ruhollah Khomeini, the founder of the Islamic Republic of Iran, was the first person to demand the taking off of the turbans of mullahs in a speech against them. He delivered it while in exile in Najaf, Iraq and calling the Iranian clerics derogatorily "court mullahs" (mullahs who supported the Pahlavi dynasty) or "corrupt mullahs", he said: "Our youth should pick up the turbans of the mullahs who create corruption in the Muslim society in the name of Islamic jurists. There is no need to beat them too much but pick up their turbans."

== Mahsa Amini protests ==
During nationwide protests in Iran in 2022, knocking off turbans became a political campaign and as of 3 November 2022 it is expanding. People throw off the turbans of the clergy to declare that they are dissatisfied with the religious government and the leaders of the Islamic Republic.

=== Reactions ===
- Moqtada as-Sadr, an Iraqi cleric and one of the leaders of the Iraqi Shiites, criticized this action and expressed concern about its possible spread to other Muslim countries.
- In response to "ammameparani", a parallel campaign called "ammamebusi" (Persian:عمامه‌بوسی; "turban kissing") was launched. Some people in Iran and Iraq kissed mullahs' turbans to show respect to the clergy and published the video of their act on social media.

== See also ==
- Estates of the realm#First Estate
- Ulama
