= Salman Musayev =

Azerbaijani Islamic scholar (born 1958)

Mufti Salman Musayev
- Title: Mufti of the Caucasus

Personal life
- Born: 1958 (age 67–68) Hamamlı village, Dmanisi Municipality, Kvemo Kartli, Georgian SSR, Soviet Union

Religious life
- Religion: Islam
- Denomination: Sunni
- Jurisprudence: Hanafi

Muslim leader
- Predecessor: Ismail Ahmedov

Salman Musayev (Note: Azerbaijani: Salman Musa oğlu Musayev) (born 1958) is an Azerbaijani Islamic scholar who is serving as the 11th and current mufti of the Religious Council of the Caucasus.

== Biography ==
He was born in 1958 in Hamamlı village of Dmanisi Municipality of Georgia to Musa Musayev. His first education was the Mir-Arab madrasa in the city of Bukhara in Uzbekistan, then the Dashkend Islam Institute and the Islamic University in Libya.

First, he served as an imam in the Juma mosque in Tbilisi, then as an assistant in the department of external relations of the Caucasus Muslims Board. In 1987, Musayev was appointed deputy of the mufti of the Religious Council of the Caucasus. At the IX Congress of the Muslims of Transcaucasia, held on 25 July 1989, he was appointed mufti. Thanks to the well deserved respect and long service in the mosque, he was awarded the post of imam of the Haji Ajdarbey mosque. He works in it until now, having repeatedly visited Mecca.

In 2002, he was awarded the Order of Honor of the Republic of Georgia.

In 2018, President Ilham Aliyev has signed a decree on awarding Salman Musayev with the Certificate of Merit of the president of Azerbaijan.
