= Abdussalam Akhundzadeh =

Azerbaijani religious educator

Sheikh ul-Islam Abdussalam Akhundzadeh
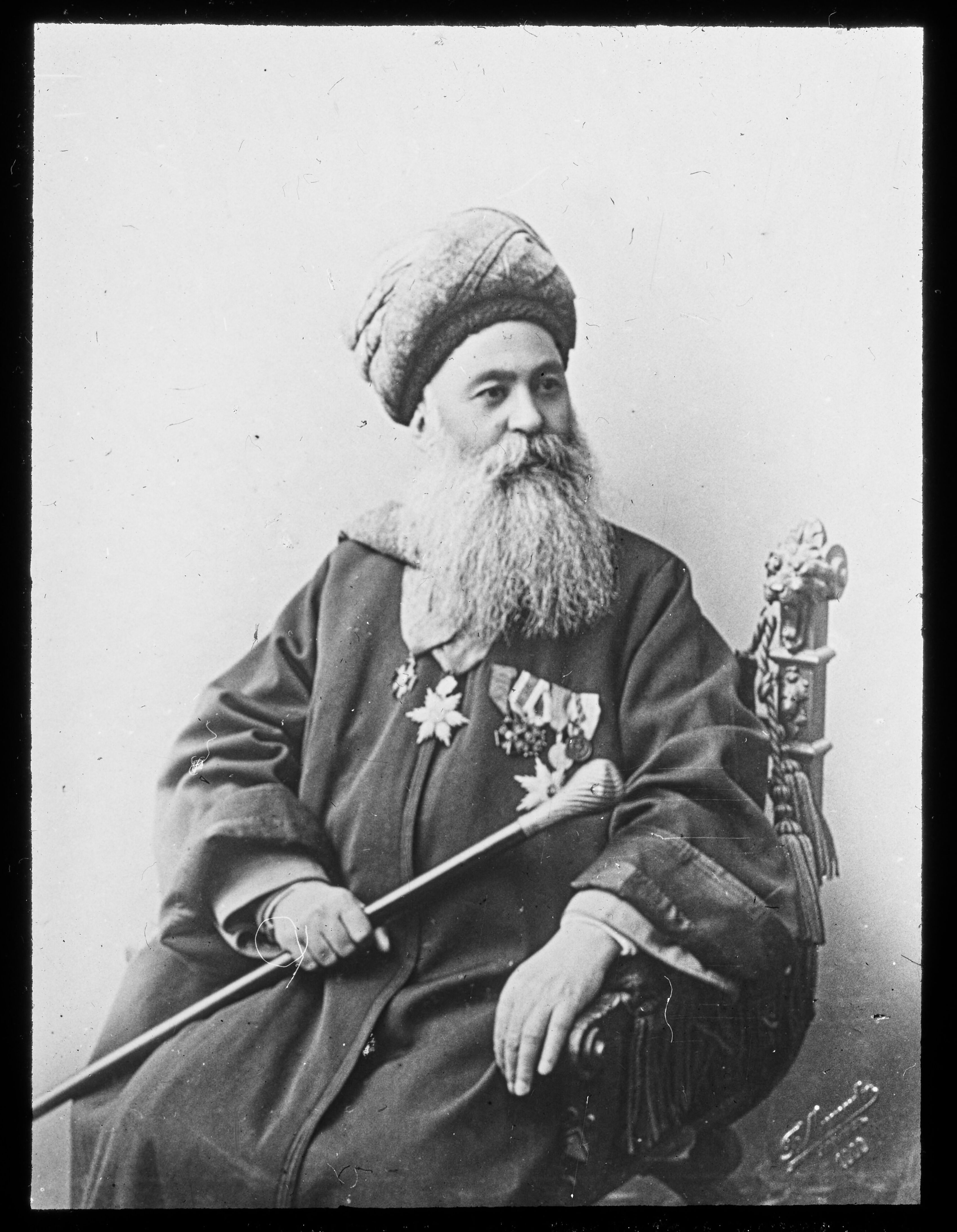
- Sheikh ul-Islam Abdussalam Akhundzadeh by Joseph de Baye
- Title: Fifth Sheikh ul-Islam of the Caucasus

Personal life
- Born: January 13, 1843 Salyan, Russian Empire
- Died: November 18, 1907 (aged 64) Tbilisi, Russian Empire

Religious life
- Religion: Islam
- School: Shia

Muslim leader
- Based in: Tbilisi, Russian Empire
- Post: Sheikh ul-Islam of the Caucasus
- Period in office: 21 June 1893 – 18 November 1907
- Predecessor: Mirza Hasan Tahirzadeh
- Successor: Mahammad Hasan Movlazadeh Shakavi

Abdussalam Akhundzadeh (Azerbaijani: Əbdüssəlam Axundzadə, Persian: آخونــدزاده عبدالســلام) was an Azerbaijani religious educator, Islamic theologian and the fifth Sheikh ul-Islam of the Caucasus.

== Early life ==
He was born in Salyan on 13 January 1843 to local cleric Akhund Vali Muhammad and his wife Khanum Aliverdi gizi. He learnt Arabic, Persian and Turkish in early periods of his life from his father. He moved to Tbilisi in 1864 and settled in current Gorgasali street, Old Tbilisi. On October 6, 1879, he was allowed to work as a teacher in the Tatar department, beating Seyid Azim Shirvani in competition, and by July 28, 1880, he was officially appointed a teacher in Gori Teachers Seminary. Meanwhile, he met and with Ali-Agha Shikhlinski, Mirza Fatali Akhundov and other Azerbaijani intelligentsia who were working and living in Tbilisi as well.

== As Sheikh ul Islam ==
He was appointed as Sheikh ul-Islam on 21 June 1893 following death of Mirza Hasan Tahirzadeh and held office until his own death in 1907. In 1895, he was elected as head of Spiritual Council of Caucasus. He was present in coronation event of Nicholas II of Russia on 26 May 1896.

He was active during Armeno-Tatar massacres, promoted peace between communities heavily. He visited Nakhchivan on 15 May 1905. Together with the qadis of Yerevan, Sharur and Nakhchivan, archimandrite of Yerevan Karapet and Jafargulu khan, he visited the villages of Garakhanbeyli, Tumbul, Goshadize and Shikhmakhmud. The Muslims of the villages of Garajig and Bulgan were gathered in the Armenian-populated village of Garakhanbeyli, where the Armenians and Muslims vowed that they would not be at enmity with each other. He published a statement alongside Armenian Catholicos Mkrtich Khrimian against massacres in June 1905. He received news of his daughter Zabita's death which was caused by nervous breakdown because of witnessing massacres while visiting Ganja. He died shortly afterwards on 18 November 1907, suffering from depression caused by his daughter's death. He was buried in Pantheon of prominent Azerbaijanis, Tbilisi. He was replaced by interim Abbasquli Sultan-Huseynbeyov and then succeeded by Mahammad Hasan Movlazadeh Shakavi.

== Family ==
He married at least three times:

1. Ummu Salama — daughter of local noble Abdul Ali bey Muradkhanov
  1. Abdullatif bey
  2. Abdurrashid bey (b. 10 April 1880) — Governor of Baku
  3. Asaf bey
  4. Valida khanum (20 December 1884)
  5. Zabita khanum (1887-1905)
  6. Hidayat bey (20 December 1893)
2. Gulara khanum — daughter of local cleric Haji Alakbar
  1. Asiya khanum (25 September 1901)
3. Sona khanum — daughter of local noble Javad bek

In addition to his immediate family, he was maternal grand-uncle of Anvar Gasimzade (whose father Ali Gasimov was Akhundzadeh's niece), as well as Fidan Gasimova and Khuraman Gasimova.

== Works ==
=== In Russian language ===
1. Учебник по исламу - Textbook on Islam
2. Лекарство от невежества (объяснение и заявление метода лечения) - Cure for Ignorance (Explaining and Declaring the Method of Treatment)

=== In Azerbaijani language ===
1. Umdətul Əhkam (“Main Verdict”, 1882, Tabriz),
2. Zubdətul Əhkam (“Selected Verdict”, 1903)
3. Vəz və nəsihət (Baku, 1903)
4. Tarixi Müqəddəs Ənbiya (“History of Holy Prophets”, 1892)
5. Tarixi Müqəddəs Xatəmül Ənbiya və Xilafət (" History of the Holy Prophets and the Caliphate "),
6. Xətti Təliq və Nəstəliq ("Handwriting Taliq and Nastaliq")

=== In Persian language ===
1. Miftahil Lisani Farsi (Persian: فارسي لسان مفتاح) - Key of the Persian language (1891)
2. Qawaid Mukhtasare Farsi - Brief Rules of the Persian Language
3. Mutalie-i Kitáb-i-Íqán (Persian: کتاب مطالعه ایقان) - How to read Kitáb-i-Íqán (1896, Tbilisi)
4. Mudafia bar megalei khasm (Persian: مدافعه بر مقابلهخصم) - Defending against the opponent's article (1897, Tbilisi)
5. Nasihati waiz (Persian: نصحيتو وعظ) - Advise of the Preacher (1903)
