= Nigar Usubova =

Nigar Usubova Nigar Usubova
- Born: May 2, 1914; Aşağı Salahlı, Elizavetpol Governorate, Russian Empire
- Died: September 15, 1995 (aged 81) Baku, Azerbaijan
- Genre: Classical music

Nigar Usubova (Azerbaijani: Nigar İbrahim bəy qızı Usubova; May 2, 1914 – September 15, 1995) was a teacher, professor and head of piano department of Baku Academy of Music. She also worked as a vice-rector for educational and scientific work of Baku Academy of Music. She was twice awarded the Order of the Badge of Honor.

== Life ==
Nigar Usubova was born in 1914 in Salahli village of Qazakh District to Ibrahim bey Usubov (major-general of Imperial Russian Army and Azerbaijan Democratic Republic) and Govhar Khanum (daughter of Mirza Huseyn Afandi Qayibov, the mufti of Transcaucasus). She graduated from the Azerbaijan State Industrial Institute in 1935 and the Azerbaijan State Conservatory in 1947.

From 1952 to 1970, she was an associate professor of the piano department of the conservatory, vice-rector for educational and scientific work. In 1966, she became a professor. From 1959 to 1969, she worked as the head of the piano department of Baku Academy of Music. She was a follower of Aleksandr Goldenweiser and studied the music of Anton Arensky, dedicating a methodological research work to him.

== Awards ==
She was twice awarded the Order of the Badge of Honor. He was an Honored Art Worker of the Republic of Azerbaijan.
