= Osman Velizade =

Mufti Osman Velizade
- Title: Mufti of the Caucasus

Personal life
- Spouse: Zuleikha Teregulova
- Children: Muhammed Muftizadeh

Religious life
- Religion: Islam
- School: Sunni

Muslim leader
- Period in office: 1842—1847
- Predecessor: Tajuddin Mustafin
- Successor: Muhammed Muftizadeh

Osman Velizade (??? - 1847) was the second mufti of the Religious Council of the Caucasus from 1842 to 1847.

== Biography ==
He was born in the village of Birinci Şıxlı of the Kazakh uezd (county) in the family of the prominent Azerbaijani poet Molla Vali Vidadi. He received his first education from his father. Having mastered the traditional oriental sciences and the Russian language from his youth he was known as a respected scientist and teacher in the Kazakh, Borchaly and Tbilisi counties.

After the dismissal of the former Mufti Tajuddin Mustafin in 1842, at the suggestion of general Golovin he was appointed the 2nd Mufti of the Caucasus. In December 1847, after the opening of the first Shia madrasa in Tbilisi Mufti Osman Velizade raised the issue of opening a Sunni madrasa with a similar charter before the viceroy Vorontsov, which was carried out in 1848. In 1849, the grand opening of the school took place. Students were exempted from tuition fees and foreigners remained in the boarding house at the madrasah, the school itself was supported by the mosque.

He died in 1847 and was succeeded by his son Muhammed Muftizadeh.

== See also ==
- Muhammed Muftizadeh
- Mirza Huseyn Afandi Qayibov
- Islam in Russia
