= Orta Salahlı, Agstafa =

Orta Salahly
- Azerbaijani: Orta Salahlı
- Location within Azerbaijan
- Coordinates: 41°12′43″N 45°22′54″E
- Country: Azerbaijan
- District: Agstafa
- Time zone: UTC+4 (AZT)
  - Summer (DST): UTC+5 (AZT)

Orta Salahlı (Orta Salahly) is a village in the Agstafa District of Azerbaijan.
