= Salahlı Kəngərli =

Salahly K'engerli
- Azerbaijani: Salahlı Kəngərli
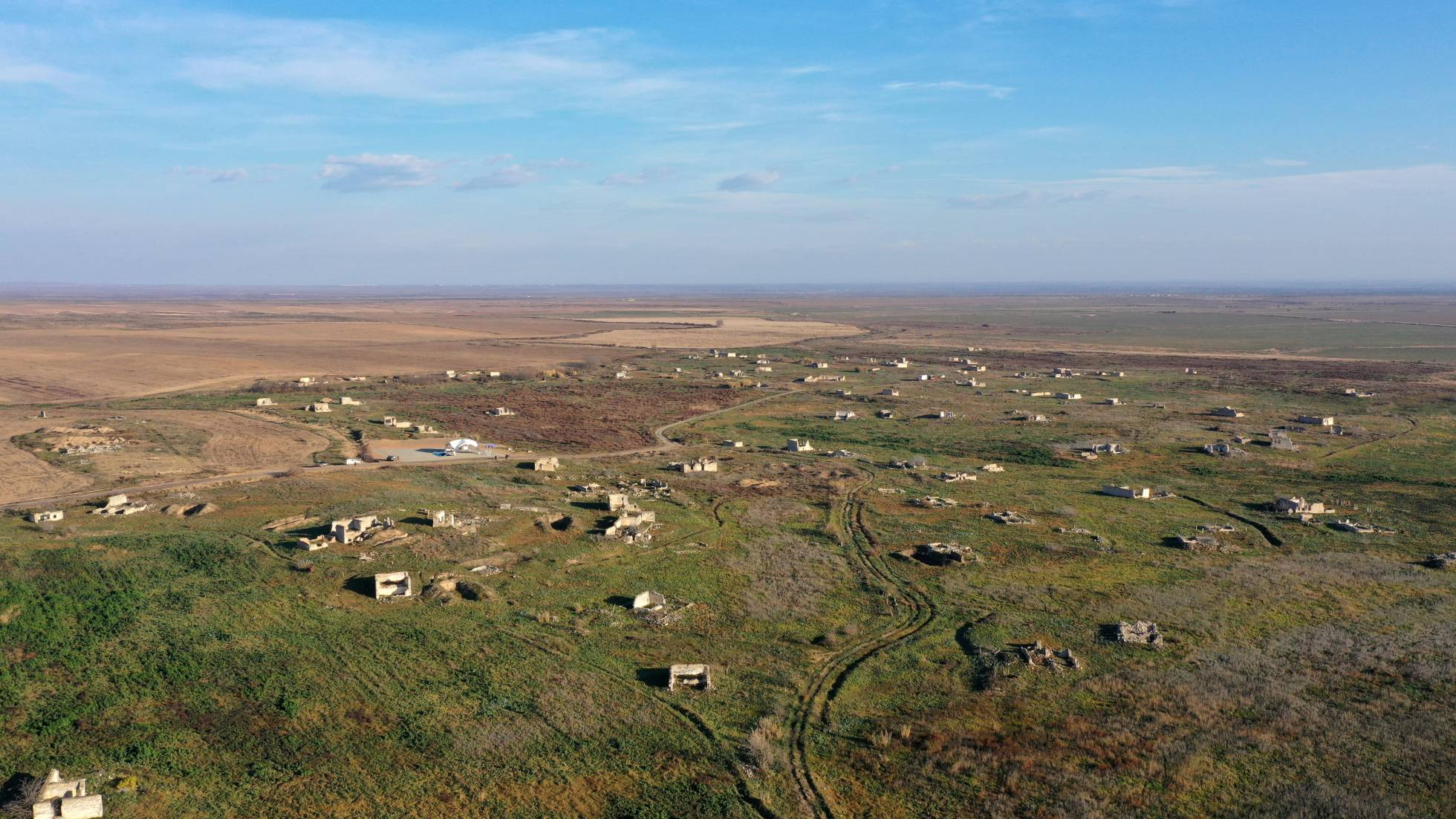

- Location within Azerbaijan Location within Karabakh Economic Region
- Coordinates: 40°08′02″N 46°54′54″E
- Country: Azerbaijan
- District: Aghdam
- Time zone: UTC+4 (AZT)
  - Summer (DST): UTC+5 (AZT)

Salahlı Kəngərli (Salahly K'engerli) is a village in the Aghdam District of Azerbaijan.
