= Cil, Azerbaijan =

Cil
- Municipality
- Location within Azerbaijan
- Coordinates: 38°51′00″N 48°45′29″E
- Country: Azerbaijan
- Rayon: Lankaran

Population
  - Total: 2,279
- Time zone: UTC+4 (AZT)
  - Summer (DST): UTC+5 (AZT)

Cil (also, Kazımlı Cil and Dzhil’) is a village and municipality in the Lankaran Rayon of Azerbaijan. It had a population of 2,279 as of 2007.

== Notable natives ==
- Allahshukur Pashazadeh, Sheikh ul-Islam and Grand Mufti of the Caucasus.
