= Salahlı, Yevlakh =

Salahly
- Municipality
- Azerbaijani: Salahlı
- Location within Azerbaijan
- Coordinates: 40°41′25″N 47°01′18″E
- Country: Azerbaijan
- District: Yevlakh

Population
  - Total: 2,569
- Time zone: UTC+4 (AZT)
  - Summer (DST): UTC+5 (AZT)

Salahlı (also, Salahly) is a village and municipality in the Yevlakh District of Azerbaijan. It has a population of 2,569.
