= Akhand (surname) =

Origin
- Origin: Bengali Muslim
- Region of origin: Bengal

Akhund (also spelled Akon, Akond, Akanda, Akondo, or Akhand) is a title awarded to Islamic scholars, sometimes used hereditarily in Bengal as a family name.

== Individuals ==
- Abdus Sattar Akon (1929–2012), Islamic scholar, teacher and politician
- Shahid Akhand (born 1935), novelist
- Hameeda Akhund (born 1936), human rights activist and academic
- Lucky Akhand (1956–2017), composer
- Happy Akhand (1960–1987), rockstar
- Kazi Md. Ejarul Haque Akondo (born 1971), High Court justice
- Masud Akhond (born 1972), actor
- Abdul Mottaleb Akanda (died 2004), politician
- Tarif Akhand (born 1998), footballer
- AK Mosharraf Hossain Akand, politician
- Abul Basar Akand, politician
- Abdul Kahar Akond, police officer
- Md. Abdur Razzak Akand, politician
- Md. Rishad Akhand,Photographer
