= Salahlı, Samukh =

Salahly
- Municipality
- Azerbaijani: Salahlı
- Location within Azerbaijan
- Coordinates: 41°09′03″N 46°16′56″E
- Country: Azerbaijan
- District: Samukh

Population
  - Total: 670
- Time zone: UTC+4 (AZT)
  - Summer (DST): UTC+5 (AZT)

Salahlı (Salahly) is a village and municipality in the Samukh District of Azerbaijan. It has a population of 670.
