= Salahlı, Zardab =

Salahly
- Municipality
- Azerbaijani: Salahlı
- Location within Azerbaijan
- Coordinates: 40°14′03″N 47°41′08″E
- Country: Azerbaijan
- District: Zardab

Population
  - Total: 598
- Time zone: UTC+4 (AZT)
  - Summer (DST): UTC+5 (AZT)

Salahlı (Salahly) is a village and municipality in the Zardab District of Azerbaijan. It has a population of 598.
