= Goychay =

Goychay may refer to:

- Goychay Rayon, Azerbaijan
- Goychay (city), Azerbaijan
- Goychay (river), Azerbaijan
- Geokchay uezd, former subdivision of the Russian Empire
