= Yukhary Salahly =

- Municipality
- Azerbaijani: Yuxarı Salahlı
- Location within Azerbaijan
- Coordinates: 41°14′30″N 45°16′02″E
- Country: Azerbaijan
- District: Qazakh

Population
  - Total: 3,406
- Time zone: UTC+4 (AZT)
  - Summer (DST): UTC+5 (AZT)

Yuxarı Salahlı (Yukhary Salahly; also, Upper Salahly) is a village and municipality in the Qazakh District of Azerbaijan. It has a population of 3,406.

== Notable natives ==
- Samad Vurgun — prominent Azerbaijani poet, People's Poet of Azerbaijan SSR (1943).
- Ibrahim bey Usubov — Azerbaijani Major General in Imperial Russian Army and Azerbaijan Democratic Republic.
- Molla Panah Vagif — 18th century poet and statesman
