= Mirza Hasan Tahirzadeh =

Sheikh-ul-Islam Mirza Hasan Tahirzadeh
- Title: Fourth Sheikh ul-Islam of the Caucasus

Personal life
- Born: May 30, 1837 Shusha, Russian Empire
- Died: June 21, 1893 (aged 56) Tbilisi, Russian Empire

Religious life
- Religion: Islam
- School: Shia

Muslim leader
- Based in: Tbilisi, Russian Empire
- Post: Sheikh ul-Islam of the Caucasus
- Period in office: 5 September 1885 - 21 June 1893
- Predecessor: Ahmad Huseinzadeh
- Successor: Abdussalam Akhundzadeh

Mirza Hasan Tahirzadeh (Azerbaijani: Mirzə Həsən Tahirzadə, Russian: Мирза Гасан-бек Таирзаде) was an Azerbaijani pedagogue and Islamic jurist, as well as fourth Sheikh ul-Islam of the Caucasus.

== Early life ==
He was born in Kangarlu village of Shusha Uyezd (modern Kəngərli, Tartar) on 30 May 1837 to Mirza Nasir bey Tahirzadeh. His ancestors hailed from Garmarud, Sarab. After receiving his primary education from his father, he then proceeded to continue his studies at the Talibiya madrasa in Tabriz. He began his religious activity on 8 April 1859 in his Qapanli village.

== Career ==
He started military service on August 21, 1873 in His Majesty's Own Cossack Escort as the akhund of the 4th Muslim platoon. He later attended International Congress of Orientalists in St. Petersburg in 1876.

After the death of Mirza Shafi, the rector of the St. Petersburg Imperial University opened applications for the vacant post of lecturer of the Persian language. Mirza Hasan was among three candidates to applied, others were Mirza Tagi Abdullabekov - translator of the Persian language of the Astrakhan Governorate, Ismail bey Nabi bek oglu - teacher of the Asian Institute. The applications were considered on September 23, 1878 at a meeting of the Faculty of Oriental Languages of the University. As a result of the ballot, "it turned out that Mirza Hasan Tairov was elected unanimously by eight ballots as a teacher of the Persian language." He taught at University between 25 September 1878 and 4 May 1879.

He served qadi of Shusha Uyezd from 11 August 1880 to 1881. From 3 April 1882 until 5 September 1885 he was teaching Sharia, Azerbaijani and Persian in Shusha Real School.

On 5 September 1885 he was elected chairman of the Spiritual Directorate of Muslims of Transcaucasia and received the spiritual title of Sheikh-ul-Islam. In his report to Alexander III, he mentioned that he instructed his community to respect the Bible, the Psalms of David, the Gospel as Quran and make no distinction between churches and mosques.

He died on 21 June 1893 in Tbilisi and succeeded by Abdussalam Akhundzadeh.

== Family ==
He married three times:

1. Sakina khanum Qasum gizi
2. Salma khanum Sayyid Ali gizi
  1. Nasir bey Tahirzade (b. 2 may 1864) — studied in St. Petersburg Imperial University
3. Salima khanum Karbalayi Shirin gizi
