= Ibrahim bey Usubov =

Azerbaijani general (1872–1920)

- İbrahim bəy Usubov
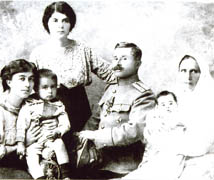
- Ibrahim bey Usubov with his family
- Born: March 6, 1872; Yukhary Salahly, Elisabethpol Governorate, Russian Empire
- Died: June 16, 1920 (aged 48); Nargin island, Baku
- Military career
- Allegiance: Russian Empire Russian Empire (1894–1917); Azerbaijan Democratic Republic (1918–1920)
- Service years: 1894–1920
- Rank: Major General
- Commands: 112th Infantry Ural Polk of the Russian army Brigade of 133rd Infantry Division of the Russian army
- Conflicts: Russo-Japanese War; World War I
- Awards: (second time)

Ibrahim bey Musa Agha oghlu Usubov (Azerbaijani: İbrahim bəy Musa Ağa oğlu Usubov; Russian: Ибрагим-Ага Усубов; March 6, 1872 – June 16, 1920) was an Azerbaijani Major General in Russian Imperial Army and Azerbaijan Democratic Republic.

== Early life ==
Ibrahim bey Usubov was born to the family of military officer, Musa Agha Usubov on March 6, 1872, in Yukhary-Salakhly village of Qazakh uyezd. Receiving military upbringing and discipline from his father, Ibrahim bey Usubov went to famous Constantine Artillery School. After graduation, Usubov received a rank of podporuchik and was assigned to Tambov 122nd Infantry Regiment.

== Family ==
Musa Agha who was an officer in Russian Imperial Army and received military rank of praporshchik July 2, 1839, was Deputy Chief of Muslim honour detachment and Commander in Chief of Separate Caucasian Corps prince Vorontsov. For his bravery in the battles against mountain peoples in village Dargo and Gerzel on January 28, 1845, he was awarded with Order of Saint Stanislaus of 3rd degree. On July 9, 1848, Musa Agha Usubov became the second lieutenant and on December 4, 1854, received poruchik (Lieutenant) rank.

In 1910, he married Govher Khanum who was the youngest daughter of the Transcaucasian Mufti Mirza Huseyn Afandi Qayibov. He had only one daughter - Nigar Usubova. She was a professor of Baku Academy of Music.

== Military career ==
In 1904, Usubov participated in Russo-Japanese War in a rank of Stabskapitän. For courage at the Battle at Port Arthur, Usubov was awarded the Order of St. Vladimir 4th degree and the Order of St. Stanislaus (with sword and bow) the third degree.

In later years, Usubov took a part in World War I. On October 14, 1914, battalion headed by Usubov attacked positions near the Mizinec village pushing Austrian forces back. All Austrian counterattacks lasting for three days were rebuffed by Usubov's battalion. In December 1914, he was promoted to the rank of lieutenant-colonel. In 1915, he was promoted to the rank of colonel. On September 9, 1915, Usubov was decorated with the Order of Saint George 4th degree for courage in battle. In January 1917, he was appointed the Commander of the brigade of 133rd Infantry Division. On July 1, 1917, he was promoted to the major general.

After the October Revolution in Russia Ibrahim bey Usubov took part in formation of Azerbaijan Army in Azerbaijan Democratic Republic (ADR). The government of ADR sent Usubov to Italy for procurement of military uniforms for the army. He negotiated with companies in Genoa, Milan, Trento, Turin and Verona.

In beginning of June, 1920, Usubov was arrested by the Bolsheviks at his home. He was executed by firing squad on June 16, 1920.

== Awards ==
- - (1904)
- - (11.12.1905)
- - (11.12.1905)
- - (21.11.1906)
- - (6.12.1909)
- - (6.02.1913)
- - (1.03.1915)
- - (19.04.1915)
- - (29.12.1916)
- - (29.04.1917)
- - (6.12.1909) - (17.05.1917)
