= Şıxmahmud =

- Municipality
- Location within Azerbaijan
- Coordinates: 39°15′05″N 45°25′43″E
- Country: Azerbaijan
- Autonomous republic: Nakhchivan
- District: Babek

Population (2005)
  - Total: 2,839
- Time zone: UTC+4 (AZT)

Şıxmahmud (also, Şeyxmahmud, Shikhmakhmud, Shykhmakhmud and Sheik-Mahmud) is a village and municipality in the Babek District of Nakhchivan, Azerbaijan.

== Geography ==
It is located near the Nakhchivan-Shahbuz highway, 13 km north from the district center, on the right bank of the Nakhchivanchay River. Its economy emphasizes agriculture, growing grain, vegetables and animal husbandry.

== Facilities ==
The village hosts a secondary school, music school, library, culture house, kindergarten, two mosques and a medical center.

== Demographics ==
Şıxmahmud has a population of 2,839.

== Etymology ==
The village was named after a nearby sacred place called Shykhmahmud. The toponym Shykhmahmud is an altered form of the name of Sheikh Mahmud.

== Shikhmahmud Necropolis ==
Shikhmahmud Necropolis is an archaeological site near the village, dating from the 1st to 3rd centuries. It was discovered by chance on a farm in 1989. Layers of ash, fragments of clay pots, and dark blue glass beads were found in an excavated ravine. Fragments of glass jars were discovered from graves. A skeleton was found in another grave. The collected materials were given to the Nakhchivan State History Museum.
