= Orta Salahlı, Qazax =

Orta Salahly
- Municipality
- Azerbaijani: Orta Salahlı
- Location within Azerbaijan
- Coordinates: 41°11′23″N 45°19′12″E
- Country: Azerbaijan
- District: Qazakh

Population
  - Total: 1,588
- Time zone: UTC+4 (AZT)
  - Summer (DST): UTC+5 (AZT)

Orta Salahlı (Orta Salahly) is a village and municipality in the Qazakh District of Azerbaijan. It has a population of 1,588.
