= Mirza Huseyn Afandi Qayibov =

Azerbaijani mufti and author (1830–1917)

Mufti Mirza Huseyn Afandi Qayibov
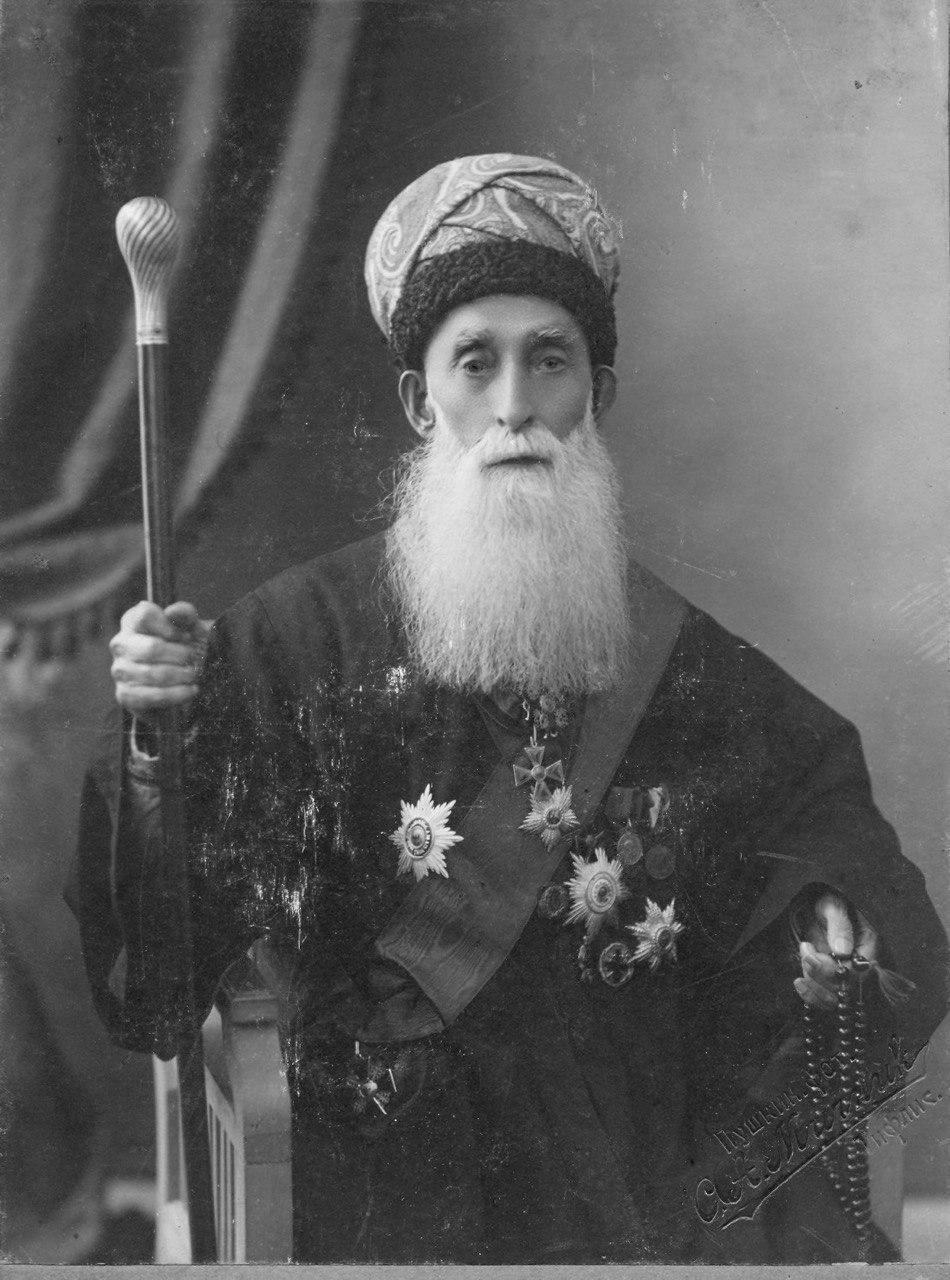
- Qayibov in 1915
- Title: Mufti of the Caucasus

Personal life
- Born: 24 April 1830 Aşağı Salahlı, Qazakh, Russian Empire
- Died: 20 February 1917 (aged 86) Tiflis, Tiflis Governorate, Russian Empire
- Occupation: clergyman, literary critic, publicist, enlightener

Religious life
- Religion: Islam
- School: Sunni

Muslim leader
- Predecessor: Abdul Hamid Efendizadeh
- Successor: Title abolished

Mirza Huseyn Afandi Qayibov (Note: Azerbaijani: میرزا حسین‌ افندی غائبوف, Mirzə Hüseyn Əfəndi Qayıbov) (24 April 1830 – 20 February 1917) was an Azerbaijani clergyman, literary critic, publicist, enlightener and Mufti of the Caucasus. He was the author of 4-volume work on Azerbaijani literature.

== Early life ==
Mirza Huseyn was born in 1830, Ashaga-Salakhly village to a clerical family. His father Molla Yusuf was the village mullah. However, he was orphaned at an early age and grew up under the care of his uncle Ibrahim, a village mullah. Having received his primary education from teacher Mohammad Musazadeh, Huseyn was well versed in religious sciences, Arabic, Persian and Turkish, as well as Eastern literature and history. After graduating, he worked as a teacher from 1847 to 1857 in his native village.

== Career ==
He was employed by Mufti of Caucasus, Mahammad Afandi (1857-1872) on July 25, 1857, at the three-year Muslim clerical school in Tbilisi. In February 1858, he began teaching Sharia and Oriental languages here. He befriended Akhundzadeh and Chavchavadze who were the prominent intellectuals of the Caucasus living in Tbilisi during this period. He rose to the rank of Governorate Secretary with seniority from January 31 of 1864 with 1858 ruble wage. He was sent to Erzurum at the disposal of the commander of the active corps to perform as Turkish language translator on February 16, 1878.

He was later transferred to the Transcaucasian Teachers Seminary in 1879. As the first teacher of Arabic and Persian at the seminary, he opened a school for the poor in Tbilisi at his own expense, and later, in the early 20th century, expanded it to become a six-grade "Mufti-Islamic School". He awarded scholarships to 43 Azerbaijanis during his career until 1883. He was relieved of teaching at the end of 1883 and appointed Mufti of Caucasus, a position he held until March 1917.

He died on 20 February 1917. After his death, the Spiritual Administration of the Caucasus lost its function due to the collapse of the imperial system. According to Aliagha Shikhlinski, he was "completely free from nationalist prejudices. Loving his people, he did not harbor any hostility towards other nations. As a believing Muslim, he knew how to respect someone else's religion, and had friends among the Russian, Georgian, and Armenian clergy."

== Works ==
Qayibov was also known as the author of several articles and books. He prepared mathematics textbooks"Masaili-ammil-hesab" (General issues of arithmetic) and linguistic work "Mabdei-talimi-sibyan" (Beginning for teenagers) for newcomers to the Muslim madrasa. He wrote a 9-part book "Tövsiyyətnamə" (Recommendations), in which he collected many proverbs, riddles and words of wisdom.

He also collaborated with Adolf Berge on his 4 volume work on Azerbaijani literature. The book contains examples from the works of 109 Azerbaijani poets who lived in the 18th and 19th centuries. The book was published in 1868, Leipzig. Other works by Qayibov include:

- “Zübtədül-Əhkamuş-şəriyyə” (Selected Verdicts on Shariah)
- “Nümuneyi-ləhceyi-Azərbaycan” (Examples of Azerbaijani dialects)
- “Müqəddəs tarix və sərfnəhv” (Sacred history)

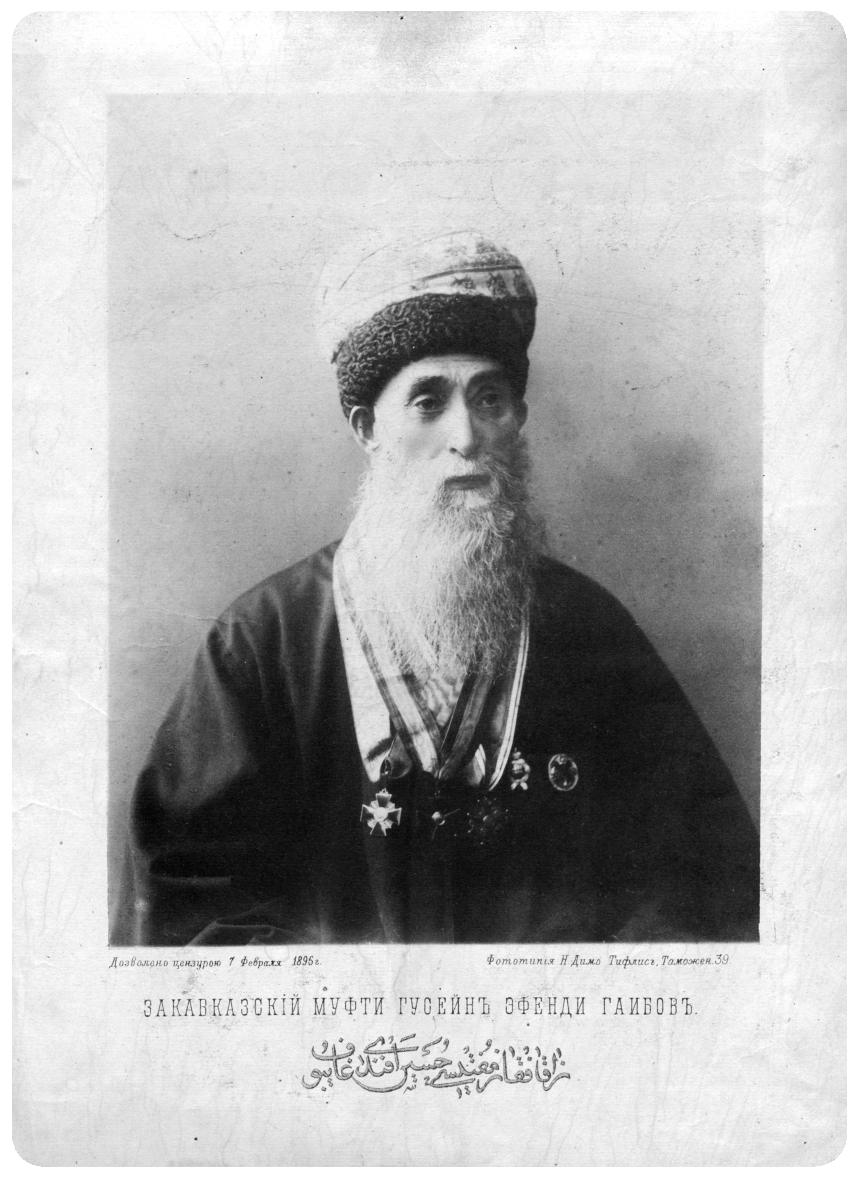
Qayibov in 1896

== Family ==
Mirza Huseyn was married to Saadat Khanum, daughter of his kinsman Abdulkarim Qayibov with whom he had many issues:

- Nadir bey Qayibov (25 September 1874 - 6 January 1941) — married Khadija Gayibova
- Bahadir bey Qayibov (22 October 1878 - 1949) — married Varvara Minayevna
- Nigar Shikhlinskaya (1878-1931) — the first Azerbaijani nurse, married Dervish-bek Palavandov, then Aliagha Shikhlinski
- Jahangir bey Qayibov (9 March 1882 - 1938) — married Ziba Khanum Qajar (20 June 1889 - 1964), daughter of Amir Kazim Mirza Qajar
- Gowhar Usubova (8 May 1885 - ?) — married Ibrahim aga Usubov in 1910
  - Nigar Usubova

== Awards ==
- Order of St. Anna - 1st (15 January 1909), 2nd and 3rd classes
- Order of St. Stanislaus for non-Christians - 1st (27 June 1896), 2nd (25 December 1875) and 3rd classes (5 January 1868)
- Order of St. Vladimir - 3rd (1 January 1887) and 4th degrees (1 January 1883)
- Medal "In memory of the Russian-Turkish war of 1877-1878"
- Medal of the Red Cross (1878)
- Medal "In Commemoration of the Coronation of Emperor Alexander III" (1883)
- Silver Medal Medal "In Commemoration of the Coronation of Emperor Nicholas II" (1896)
- Dark bronze medal for works on the general population census of 1897
- Immaculate Service Insignia (22 August 1898)
- Order of the Lion and the Sun, 2nd degree with a star (18 May 1900)
