= Taza Pir Mosque =

Mosque in Baku, Azerbaijan

- Azerbaijani: Təzəpir Məscidi; Persian: مسجد تازه پیر
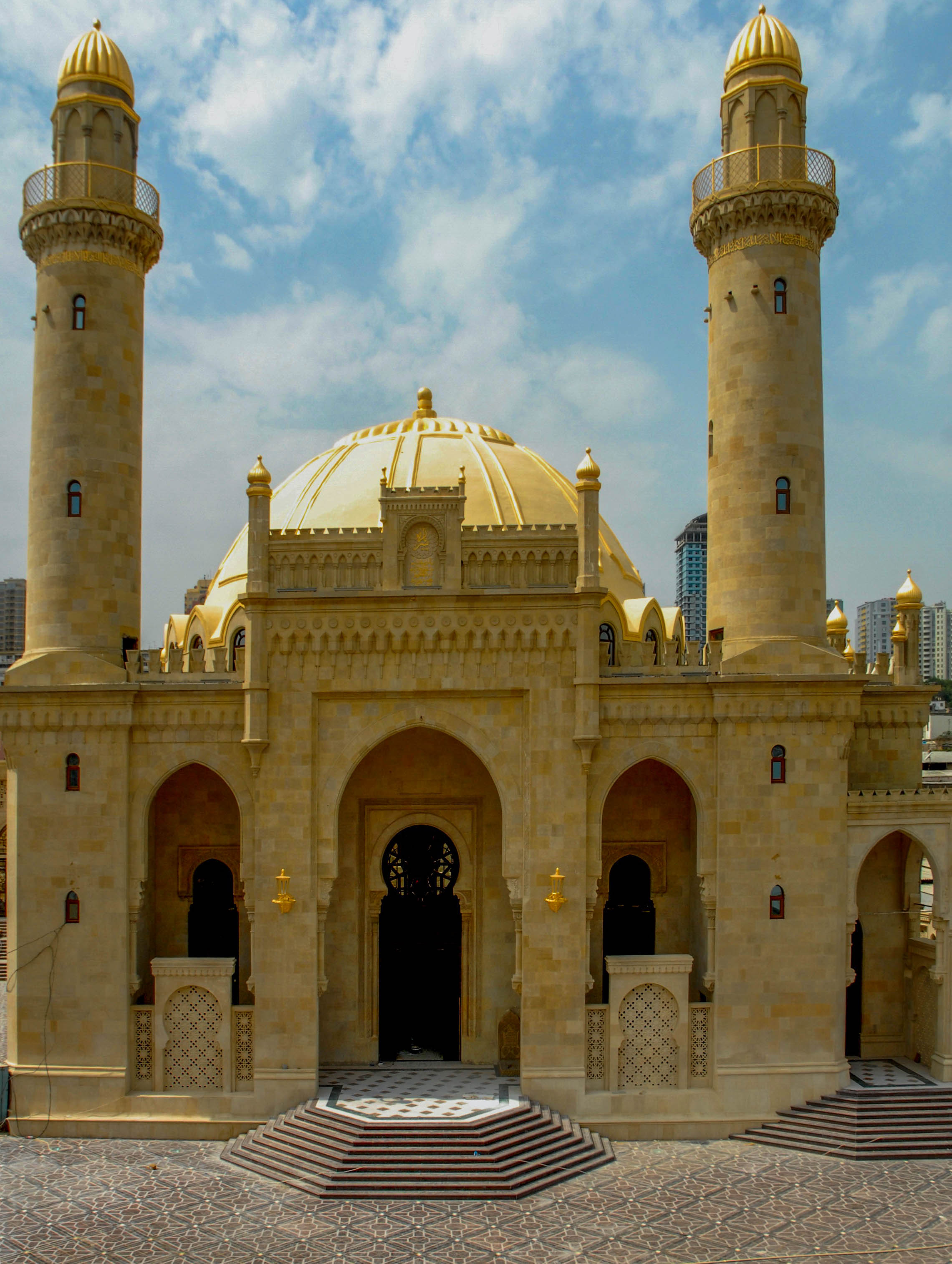
- The mosque façade in 2008

- Location of the mosque in Baku

Religion
- Affiliation: Shia Islam
- Ecclesiastical or organisational status: Mausoleum (14th-15th centuries); Mosque (1914–1917); Profane use (1917–1943); Mosque (since 1943)
- Leadership: Haji Allahshukur Pashazadeh (Shaykh al-Islam of the Caucasus)
- Status: Active

Location
- Location: Baku, Absheron
- Country: Azerbaijan
- Coordinates: 40°22′19″N 49°49′53″E

Architecture
- Architect: Eugeniusz Skibiński
- Type: Mosque architecture
- Style: Islamic; Shirvan style
- Funded by: Nabat Khanum Ashurbeyova
- Groundbreaking: 1905
- Completed: 1914 (as a mosque)

Specifications
- Capacity: 720 worshippers
- Interior area: 1,400 m^{2} (15,000 sq ft)
- Dome: One
- Minaret: Two
- Materials: White stone; marble; gold

The Taza Pir Mosque (Azerbaijani: Təzəpir Məscidi, Persian: مسجد تازه پیر) is a Shia Islam mosque, located in Baku, Azerbaijan. Its construction began in 1905 and was finished by 1914. The concept for the mosque as well as its financing was provided by an Azeri female philanthropist, Nabat Khanum Ashurbeyova (Ashurbeyli).

== History ==
The history of the sanctuary dates back to the 14th and 15th centuries. It existed first time as a tomb. The tomb belonged to Abu Seyid Abdulla who was a scholar and Islamic saint. The location of the sanctuary was known as “Xalfadam” until the middle of the last century. Over time, the tomb of Abu Seyid Abdulla was exposed to destruction. However, the local population of Baku, especially the Baku elites restored it several times.

In 1817, son-in-law of Huseyngulu Khan, Qasim Bey financed restoration work of the tomb. The actual construction of the mosque began in the early 20th century, started by construction foreman Karbalai Ahmed, and completed under the direction of the architect Eugeniusz Skibiński between 1905 and 1914, approximately 90 years after the restoration of the tomb. The mosque was built on the tomb. The construction costs were met by Azerbaijani philanthropist Nabat Khanum Ashurbeyova. The construction of the Taza Pir Mosque took more than nine years due to financial and political issues of that time. Nabat Khanum, who financed several charitable projects simultaneously in Baku, could not afford to complete the mosque. In addition, due to breakout of Balkan War in 1911, Tsarist Russia had strictly controlled the activities of banks in Baku, assuming that Muslim millionaires could help the Ottoman Empire so that the Baku millionaires had to get the approval of officials from the Tsarist Department for the amount to be spent on the construction of Taza Pir Mosque.

Azerbaijani national industrial magnate and philanthropist, Haji Zeynalabdin Taghiyev, also actively attended in the construction process of the mosque.

Only three years after opening the mosque was closed in connection with the October Revolution in 1917. Over the years the mosque functioned as a cinema and a barn, and since 1943 to present day, as a mosque. The Akhund of the mosque is the Shaykh al-Islam of the Caucasus Allahshukur Pashazadeh.

== Architecture ==
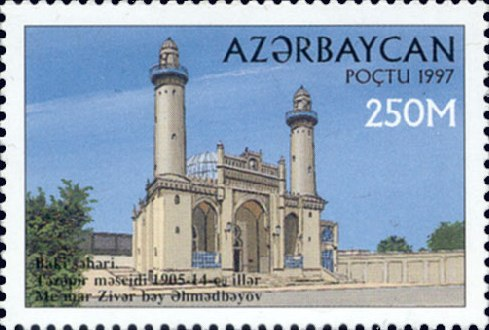
The mosque pictured on a 1997 Azerbaijani postage stamp

Dome of the Taza Pir Mosque

The Taza Pir Mosque was the first religious building in Baku where white stone was used in its construction. Architect Eugeniusz Skibiński designed the interior of the mosque in accordance with architectural examples of the Muslim East. The Taza Pir Mosque was considered an entirely new stage, not only in the urban structure of Baku but also in the religious buildings of Absheron, due to architectural features. The façade of the Taza Pir Mosque is composed of porticos and minarets that rise from the flanks. A square 19.6 m^{2}-shaped (211 sq ft) worship hall is complemented by huge domes. In interior decorations, local architectural elements were used. There are examples of calligraphy from the holy book Koran written inside and outside the mosque, as well as on the minarets. The interior of the mosque has an area of 1,400 m^{2} (15,000 sq ft) and decorated with ornaments of painting schools of Azerbaijan plus with samples from eastern ornaments.

Between 2006 and 2009, the mosque underwent construction work and the old and detrited parts were restored. After restoration processes, the mosque provided with a ventilation system and its floor covered Namazgah carpet in which 720 people can worship at the same time. The height of the dome and a half meters. The mihrab and dome of the mosque made of marble, while the tops of minarets and labels are made of gold.

Written on the dome, six times, in Arabic are the words La ilaha ilallah, taken from the Muslim proclamation of faith or Shahada, made from Qızılqaya (Gyzylgaya) stone.

== See also ==
- Islam in Azerbaijan
- List of mosques in Azerbaijan
- List of mosques in Baku
