= Akhund =

Persian name for an Islamic cleric

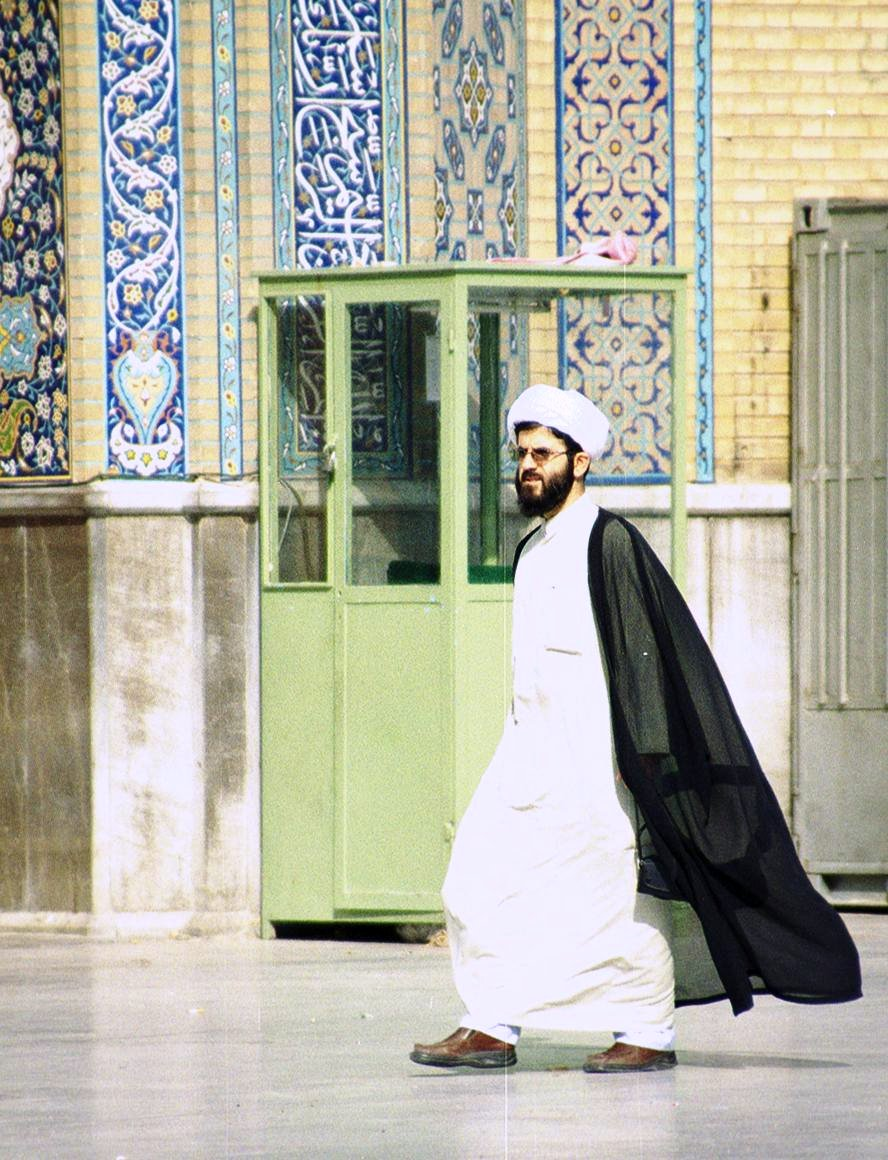
Persian Akhund

Akhund (Persian: آخوند) is a Persian title or surname for Islamic scholars, common in Iran, Azerbaijan, Tajikistan, Afghanistan, and Pakistan. Other names for similar Muslim scholars include Sheikh and Mullah.

The Standard Chinese word for Imam (Chinese: 阿訇; pinyin: āhōng), used in particular by the Hui people, also derives from this term. Other similar Chinese terms (Chinese: 阿衡; pinyin: āhéng and Chinese: 阿洪; pinyin: āhóng) also exist.

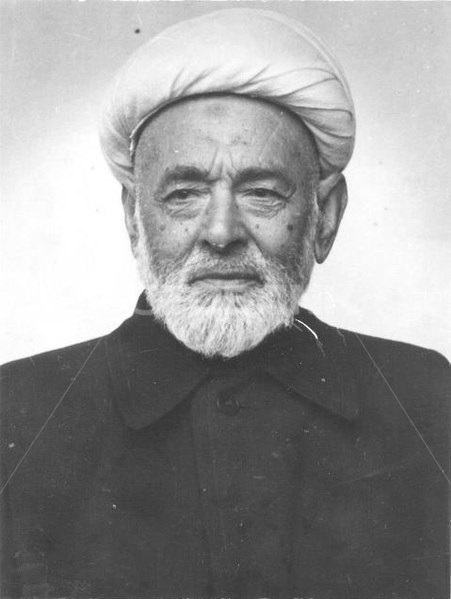
Akhund Agha Alizadeh, the first Shaykh al-Islam of the Azerbaijan Democratic Republic

== Duty ==
Akhunds are religious and spiritual leaders. They lead the prayers in the mosques, deliver religious sermons, perform religious ceremonies such as marriage rituals, birth rituals etc. Many of them were magistrates or justices of Sharia courts who also exercised extrajudicial functions, such as mediation, guardianship over orphans and minors, and supervision and auditing of public works. They also often teach in Islamic schools known in Iran as hawzas and in other countries as madrasas.

Akhunds will usually have completed higher studies on Islamic subjects such as Sharia, Fiqh (Islamic jurisprudence), Quran etc. They commonly dress in religious attire.

== Old usage ==
In Iran, they are also called mullah, molavi, sheikh, haj-agha, or

ruhani. The word ruhani means "spiritual, holy". Ruhani is considered a more polite term for Muslim clerics, used by Iranian national television and radio and by devout Muslim families. Akhund is increasingly outmoded in Iran, usually with only the older clerics having the title as part of their name. It has not been used widely as a title since the Qajar dynasty.

In Afghanistan, and among the Pashtuns of the Afghan-Pakistan border region, the term is still current in its original sense as an honorific.

== Use in personal names ==
The Azerbaijani surname Akhundov (as in e.g. Mirza Fatali Akhundov) is formed from the word akhund.

Akhand is used as a surname among Bengalis.

== See also ==
- Akhund Abdul Ghaffur
- Clericalism in Iran
- Turban knocking
- Guardianship of the Islamic Jurists
- Kyai, similar term in Indonesia
- Ulama
- Seghatoleslam
- Mohyeddin
