= List of tourist attractions in Ganja =

Ganja, a popular tourist destination in Azerbaijan, is the second largest city in the country. The city is located 400–450 meters above sea level, and lies on the Ganja-Gazakh plain in the Kur-Araz lowland in the west of Azerbaijan, 375 km away from Baku. It is situated at the north-eastern foothills of the Lesser Caucasus mountain ranges on the Ganjachay river. Ganja offers a variety of tourist attractions, including its nature, historical sights, monuments, museums, theaters and other places.

== Historic buildings ==
Attraction	Period	Description	Picture	Citations
Chokak bath	1606	The Chokak Bath is located near Juma Mosque in Ganja. It was built in 1606 based on a project by the architect Sheikh Bahaddin Mahammad Amil. A mixture of egg-white with clay-lime and red brick was used in the construction. It has one large and two small domes.		
Shah Abbas Caravanserai	17th century	The Caravanserai dates to the 17th century and is located 100 meters away from the Juma Mosque. It was built during the reign of Shah Abbas by the architect Sheikh Bahaddin in the Oriental style. A traditional mixture of egg-white with clay-lime and red brick was used in the construction. The caravanserai features 54 rooms and 13 halls, space for pack animals.		
Ughurlu khan caravanserai	17th-18th centuries	Ughurlu khan karavanserai is located close to Shah Abbas karavanserai and dates back to the 17th-18th centuries. Traditional mixture of eggwhite with clay-lime and red brick was used in the construction.		

== Mausoleums ==
Attraction	Period	Description	Picture	Citations
Nizami Mausolem	1991	Nizami Mausoleum is considered the symbol of Ganja. It is located at the entrance of Ganja in Ahmedli village on the east part of Ganja. The construction of the first Mausoleum on the grave of the outstanding poet Nizami Ganjavi dates back to the 13-14th centuries. The current structure of the monument was restored in 1991 on the existing building which was built in 1947. The garden around the tall cylindrical building constructed from solid granite blocks has statues inscribed on metal commemorating Nizami's epic poems. Recent restoration works in the Mausoleum transformed this garden into a campus on an area of 35 hectares which includes the Mausoleum, statues depicting scenes from Nizami's poems, artificial lake, five "buta" elements, and five fountains.		
Tomb of Javad khan	2005	The Tomb was erected on the grave of the last ruler of Ganja Khanate Javad khan in 2005. Baked brick was used in the construction of this quadrangular-shaped tomb. It is located near the Juma Mosque.		

== Museums ==
Attraction	Period	Description	Picture	Citations
History-Ethnography Museum	1924	The History-Ethnography Museum of Ganja is located at the back of Ganja City Hall in the former mansion of the descendants of Javad khan. The museum was established in 1924 and moved to this building in 1972. The collection of the museum includes archaeological findings, ethnographic, epigraph, and numismatic samples displayed in 18 rooms. A woman skeleton up to 220 cm high and accessories, as well as household items buried with her dated back to the 2nd millennium BC, Silver crown of Caucasian Albania era, lanterns discovered around Nizami Ganjavi's grave, Ganja rugs, the flag of Ganja Khanate, coins related to different periods of Azerbaijan history, jewelry, pottery, metalworking samples are among them.		
Ganja Fortress Gates Monumental Complex	2012-2014	Monumental complex Ganja Fortress Gates - the Museum of Archaeology and Ethnography is located at the entrance to the eastern direction of Ganja on the Baku-Gazakh highway. The complex was built between 2012 and 2014. The fortress was built on both sides of the highway and its total length is 50 meters with bastions of 22 meters. The main 5-storey part of the fortress is considered 7-storey with the plinth. There is a State Flag installed in the park around the fortress. The tunnel, which is 62 meters long, connects both fortresses. The complex includes two iron gates, a gallery of the portraits of outstanding figures from Ganja, Military History Museum of Ganja, ethnographic museum dedicated to the lifestyle and culture of the population Ganja in the Complex. The gates have been made on the sketches of ancient Ganja gates made by master Ibrahim Osmanoghlu in 1063 which were damaged as the result of 1139 Ganja earthquake and kept in Gelati Monastery of Kutaisi after Demetrius I of Georgia took it.		
Nizami Ganjavi Museum	2014	Nizami Museum located on the opposite site of Nizami Mausoleum was opened in 2014. There are exhibits reflecting the life and creativity of the poet, his manuscripts and illustrations on the motifs of "Khamsa". There is a statue to the poet in front of the museum.		
Mirza Shafi Vazeh Museum	2017	The building of the museum located in Gulustan settlement of Ganja was constructed between 2016 and 2017. The museum hosts an exhibition of documents and paintings related to the creativity of Azerbaijani poet and enlightener Mirza Shafi Vazeh who was born in Ganja in 1794. There is a special corner commemorating the literary society "Divan-i Hikmet" established by Vazeh in 1820.		
Mir Jalal Pashayev house-museum	2007	The house-museum of Azerbaijani writer Mir Jalal Pashayev who lived and worked in Ganja was put into use in September 2007.		
Museum of Miniature Books	2016	Ganja branch of Museum of Miniature Books located City Hall Square of Ganja was inaugurated in 2016. It has a collection of more than a thousand miniature books.		

== Parks and gardens ==
Attraction	Period	Description	Picture	Citations
Khan's garden	1847	One of the main rest places of the population of Ganja was initially made as a garden of Javad khan on an area of 52 hectares during the Ganja Khanate. After the Russian invasion, this garden was eradicated and some of the trees were relocated to the newly established Sardar's Garden by the viceroy of the Caucasus Mikhail Semyonovich Vorontsov on the lower part of previous garden in 1847. The garden was reconstructed after Azerbaijan gained independence and recalled "Khan's garden". There is a monument to the Azerbaijani poet Nigar Rafibeyli, the tomb of Israfil Mammadov, pine-tree alley, fountains, ponds, remains of Ganja fortress walls and a 350-seat open-air theater.		
Heydar Aliyev park complex	2014	Heydar Aliyev park complex covers an area of 450 hectares with 2 km length in Yeni Ganja residential area of Ganja. It was inaugurated in 2014. The park complex includes 17 fountains and 32 decorated garden plots, an amphitheater for 3500 spectators, "Triumphal arch" with 40 meters height, Youth Center, Heydar Aliyev Center, Museum of Modern Art, a 4-step waterfall and an artificial lake on an area of 5 hectares.		
Ganjachay park-boulevard complex	2017	The park-boulevard complex was opened along the bank of Ganjachay river in February 2017. The park is located on an area of 34 hectares with 1.2 km length. There are 15 fountains and 10 monuments installed in the park. The complex also includes Flag Square of Ganja, Ali and Nino Complex, Press House, bookstore, cafe and restaurants, playground and amusement facilities.		
Istiglal park	1991	Istiglal park located in Gulustan settlement of Ganja was opened on May 28, 1991, in honor of the Republic day of Azerbaijan. There is a huge monument of Azerbaijani Flag and map. The park was renovated in 2014 and covers an area of 5 hectares. A monument in 15 meters high has been erected in honor to ADR on which Declaration of Independence of Azerbaijan adopted on May 28, 1918, was inscribed.		
Mirza Shafi Vazeh park	2017	The park named after Mirza Shafi Vazeh was built around Mirza Shafi Vazeh Museum in 2017. It is covering an area of 2 hectares. There is a statute to the outstanding Azerbaijani figure Vazeh. The wall behind the statue has been illustrated with mosaic images of contemporaries of Vazeh.		
Nizami Ganjavi park in Hajikend	2018	The Park named "The predecessors and successors of Nizami Ganjavi" was opened in Hajikend town in June 2018. There are a total of 17 monuments of prominent historical figures who lived in Ganja, including Mahsati Ganjavi, Mirza Shafi Vazeh, Abul Ula Ganjavi, Givami Ganjavi, Usta Bender, Sheykh Zaman, Dokhtari Khatibi Ganjavi, Afrasiab, and Omar Ganji. The sculptor of the statues in the park is Asef Hasanov.		

== Religious places ==
Attraction	Period	Description	Picture	Citations
Imamzadeh religious complex	14th-15th centuries	Imamzadeh Complex – a pilgrimage site is located 7 kilometers northeast of Ganja. The Complex includes Imamzadeh Mausoleum, Imamzadeh mosque, vault, caravanserai, cemetery and funerary monuments and surrounding brick walls with the entrance portal. The major monument of the complex is the Mausoleum which was constructed over the tomb of religious figure of the 8th century presumably in the 14th-15th centuries. The mosque, vault and other tombs were built in the 17th century. The height of the dome of the Mausoleum is 2.7 meters, while the Mausoleum has 12 meters height. The diameter of the dome covered with light-blue tiles is 4.4 meters.		
Juma Mosque	1606	Juma Mosque is also called Shah Abbas Mosque because it was constructed during his reign. The mosque complex includes the main mosque building, an entrance portal with minarets on both sides and the former madrasa building. The Mosque building was built of red brick in 1606 and had its minarets added in 1776. The big white dome of the square-shaped mosque has a height of 17 meters.		
Alexander Nevsky Church	1887	Alexander Nevsky Church is a Russian Orthodox church built in 1887 at the site of the old cemetery in Ganja during Russia's occupation of Azerbaijan. The church building was built of bricks in the Byzantine architectural style. In the early years of USSR the functions of the Church discontinued and then reopened in 1946. Some icons in the interior have survived up to present as the icons of St. Alexander Nevsky and Mary Magdalene.		

== Cultural buildings ==
Attraction	Period	Description	Picture	Citations
Ganja Philharmonic Hall	2017	The new building of Ganja Philharmonic Hall was inaugurated in 2017. It is located close to the central square of Ganja. The balcony of the concert hall on the third floor features the statutes to the famous Azerbaijani composers Uzeyir Hajibeyov, Fikrat Amirov, Gara Garayev, Niyazi and Arif Malikov.		
Ganja State Puppet Theatre		The building of the Ganja State Puppet Theater was constructed in 1885 as a Lutheran church by the German settlers who moved to Elisabethpol (the official name for Ganja in 1804–1918) after 1818. Tuff is the main material used in its construction.		
Mahsati Ganjavi Center	2014	It is a cultural center inaugurated in January 2014 commemorating poet Mahsati Ganjavi. Photograph exhibition devoted to the creativity of the poet, and her poems, as well as a national garment exhibition related to the period when Mahsati lived are displayed in the center. In addition, there is an exhibition of national musical instruments. The Center includes a statue of Mahsati Ganjavi and a park named after Mahsati Ganjavi.		

== Squares ==
Attraction	Period	Description	Picture	Citations
Ganja City Hall Square	20th century	İt is the main square in Ganja called Heydar Aliyev square (former Lenin square). The building of Ganja Executive Power with tall arches and Heydar Aliyev Museum are located here. The building of Execute Power of Ganja was constructed during Soviet times in 1961 (architects E.İsmayilov and F.Leontyeva) and served as the administrative building of the City Committee of the CPSU.		
Flag square	2012	The Flag Square of Ganja is a large city square located on the right bank of the Ganja river. A flag measuring 50 by 25 flies on a pole 100 m high. The Flag square of Ganja was inaugurated on 21 January 2012.		

== Shopping ==
Attraction	Period	Description	Picture	Citations
Javad khan street		Javad Khan Street is the traditional large pedestrian and shopping street that is located in downtown Ganja. Most of the buildings along the street date back to the Russian Empire period of Ganja history.		
Ganja Mall	2014-2017	Constructed between 2014 and 2017, Ganja Mall is considered as the city's largest mall. The 8-storey mall has a total area of 26.293 square meters.		

== Nature ==
Attraction	Period	Description	Picture	Citations
Hajikend village		Hajikend is the major resort zone for people of Ganja and surrounding areas in the administrative-territorial unit of Kapaz raion of Ganja. It is situated 23 km south of Ganja, on the north-eastern of the Lesser Caucasus mountains.		

== Others ==
Attraction	Period	Description	Picture	Citations
Khamsa Monumental Compound	2016	Khamsa Monumental Compound consists of 5 large book-shaped monuments recalling Nizami's poems in the park line along the highway between Ganja fortress gates and Nizami Mausoleum. Each of them has 12 meters length, 9 meters height and 2 meter width. The book-shaped monuments have different colors: "The Treasury of Mysteries" is black symbolizing keeping secrets, "Khosrov and Shirin" is golden symbolizing throne, "Layla and Majnun" is white symbolizing pure love, "The Seven Beauties" is turquoise symbolizing kings' talisman in the East, and "Romance of Alexander the Great" is red symbolizing victory.		
Bottle House	1966-1967	Bottle house is a private residence built entirely out of glass bottles and colorful stones in 1966–1967 by a resident of Ganja. The house was dedicated to the memory of the brother who went missing during World War II. The walls of the house were decorated with the portraits of family members and their names, construction year of the house and "Ganja" inscriptions.		

== Places nearby ==
Attraction	Period	Description	Picture	Citations
Goygol national Park	2008	Goygol National Park was founded in April 2008 on the base of Goygol State Nature Reserve established in 1925, in the territories of administrative raions of Goygol, Goranboy and Dashkasan. Goygol National Park is located at an altitude between 1100 and 3065 meters.		
Lake Goygol		Goygol (Azerbaijani: Göygöl, literally "the Blue Lake") is a natural impounded lake in Azerbaijan. It is situated at the footsteps of Murovdag at an altitude of 1556 meters not far from Ganja.		
Lake Maralgol		Maralgol is a mountainous lake at the height of 1910 m. on Murovdag Mountain in the west of Azerbaijan. The lake occupies the territory of 23 hectares with utmost depth of 60 m.		

== See also ==
- Ganja, Azerbaijan
- Hajikend, Ganja
