= Shah Abbas Caravanserai, Ganja =

Caravanserai in Ganja, Azerbaijan

Shah Abbas Caravanserai
- Şah Abbas karvansarası (Azerbaijani); کاروانسرای شاه‌عباس (Persian)
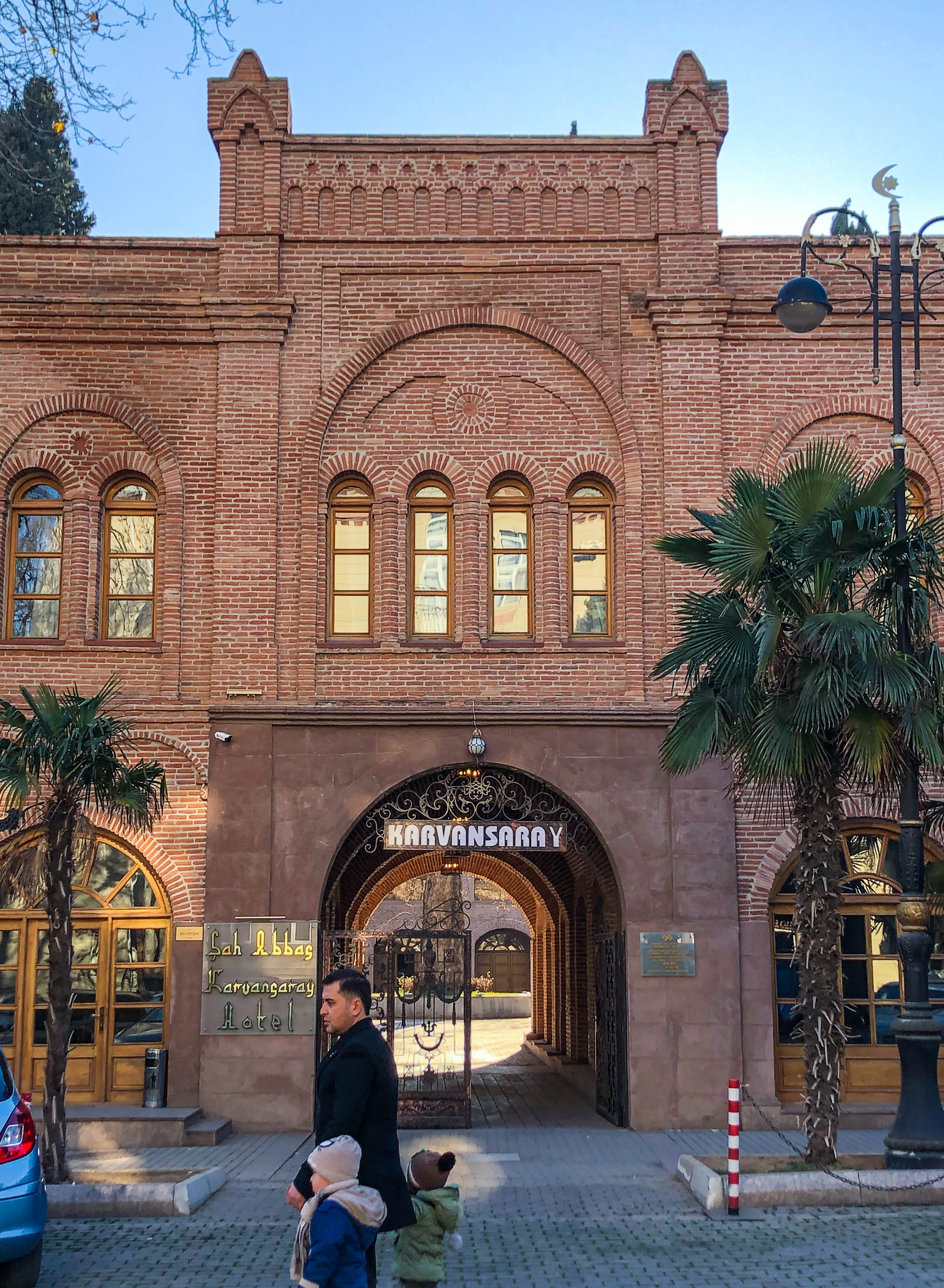
- Shah Abbas Caravanserai in 2023

- Location within Azerbaijan
- 40°40′58″N 46°21′38″E
- Type: Caravanserai
- Location: Ganja, Azerbaijan

Site notes
- Condition: Restored
- Public access: Yes

Shah Abbas Caravanserai was built in Ganja by the order of Iranian Shah Abbas. The caravansary was connected to Chokak Hamam and Shah Abbas Mosque by underground roads.

The monument was included in the list of immovable historical and cultural monuments of national importance by the decision No. 132 issued by the Cabinet of Ministers of the Republic of Azerbaijan on August 2, 2001.

== History ==
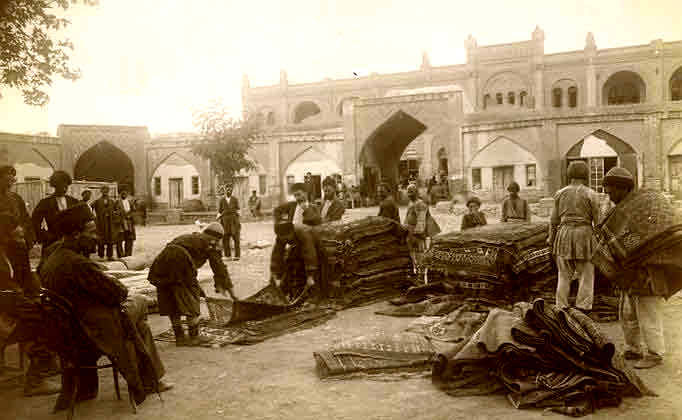
Caravanserai in XIX

The construction of the caravansary was started in 1606 by the order of Shah Abbas Safavi. The design and construction of the building was headed by Sheikh Bahaeddin. The two-story building made of baked red bricks was commissioned in 1613–1614.

Russian poet Yakov Polonsky stayed in the Shah Abbas caravanserai for a few days while visiting Ganja in the middle of the 19th century. Later, in 1847, he published his impression of the city and this caravanserai in the essay "Ganja" published in the 21st issue of the Zakavkazsky vestnik newspaper.

During the massacre committed by Armenians in Ganja in 1905, this caravanserai was also burned and the monument was severely damaged. Regarding the burning of the caravanserai, Firidun bey Kocharli wrote in his memoirs:

In 1905, ... did not survive because of the Armenian tribe. Shah Abbas caravanserai burned down.

=== After April invasion ===
After the occupation of Azerbaijan by the Bolsheviks, the caravanserai operated until 1930. In the 1970s, the Shah Abbas and Ugurlu Khan caravansaries underwent complex artistic design, restoration and beautification works under the guidance of artist Javanshir Mammadov. Later, the "Azerbaijani miniatures" museum and "Mahsati Ganjavi" museum of women's creativity were established in the caravanserai. A statue of the poet Mahsati Ganjavi was placed on the facade of the building.

=== After Independence ===
The monument was included in the list of immovable historical and cultural monuments of national importance by the decision No. 132 issued by the Cabinet of Ministers of the Republic of Azerbaijan on 2 August 2001.

The Ganja Humanitarian College was located in the building of the caravanserai for a while. Since 2011, the restoration works of the caravanserai have been started. One million pieces of red bricks produced in Shaki were used in the construction and restoration works. As in the 17th century, a mixture of lime and sand was mainly used in the renovation work. In order to preserve the historicity of the caravanserai, which underwent clumsy repairs several times during the Soviet era, the previously built additional buildings were demolished. The strengthening of the historical monument has been completed, the damaged parts have been repaired, and communication lines have been built. The roof of the caravanserai was replaced, the right wall of the facade, which was in danger of collapsing, was restored, and all the cells and rooms of the building were restored to their previous appearance.

The Shah Abbas caravanserai was restored together with the adjacent Ugurlu Khan Caravanserai. Both caravanserais have 120 rooms, 900 m^{2} corridor, 4 internal and 3 external entrances. After restoration, it functions as a hotel complex.

== Architecture ==
The caravanserai is quadrangular in shape. It has two yards, in the back yard, plane trees are planted along the building. The central part of the building consists of eight small arched balconies, and the sides have large arched balconies. The caravanserai has a basement, a kitchen, small and large rooms for guests, stables for pack animals, an open-air teahouse in the yard, and numerous storage and storage rooms.

The first floor of the building consists of 17 large arches. On the first floor, inside the right and left walls, cone-shaped slits were made for the guards to stand, and lamps and candles were used to illuminate the interior. This part of the building is windowless. The stairs to the second floor consist of 44 steps and are located inside the caravanserai. The dome that forms the ceiling of the high interior, where the steps are located, has a grid pattern composition in the shape of an eight-pointed star. Also, considering the darkness of the interior, the architect used an eight-pointed light-colored star to solve the problem. Also, a dense, compact junction of the composition was created with the ornament elements of the central part of the dome. Geometric pattern elements spreading from the center to the edges reduce the tension in the composition and give it freedom.

The caravanserai had 54 single rooms, 15 large rooms, a shack, a dining room, a tea room, as well as a room used for other purposes, a roof and storerooms. The caravansary was connected to Chokak Hamam and Shah Abbas Mosque by underground roads.

== See also ==
- Sa'd al-Saltaneh Caravanserai
- Jamalabad Caravanserai
