= Mahsati Ganjavi Center =

Mahsati Ganjavi Center (Azerbaijani: Məhsəti Gəncəvi Mərkəzi) is a center dedicated to the Persian poet Mahsati Ganjavi. The center is located in Ganja. It was built with the support of the Heydar Aliyev Foundation.

== About ==
Construction of the building began in 2013, and the opening ceremony was held on January 21, 2014. There is a garden and a monument to Mahsati in front of the building. In the three-storey building there are a museum, a room of Mahsati, a hall of ancient national musical instruments, a hall of national clothing, an electronic library, etc. There are carpets with portraits of the poet on display.

The electronic library contains rubai of Mehseti in Azerbaijani, Russian and English. Samples of women's national clothing of the Renaissance are shown at the exhibition of national costumes of the center. The art gallery displays posters, monumental works dedicated to the image and work of Mahsati Ganjavi. In the room of Mahsati there are a monument, miniatures and paintings.

The center also has a music studio, mugham departments, a piano, and a meeting room.

== See also ==
- Mahsati Ganjavi
- List of tourist attractions in Ganja
