= Hacıkənd =

Hacıkənd (also, Hajikend) may refer to:

- Hacıkənd, Ganja, Azerbaijan
- Hacıkənd, Kalbajar, Azerbaijan
