= Kurgans of Goygol =

Monument in Mauritania

Kurgans of Goygol is a historical and archaeological monument in the Goygol District of Azerbaijan.

== About ==
The Goygol District is one of the regions where mound-type monuments are most common in the territory of Azerbaijan. Until now, hundreds of barrows have been recorded on both banks of Ganjachay, in the plain area on small hills, and some of them were studied by people of German descent who settled in this area in the late 19th and early 20th centuries. Among the researchers, Y. Hummel's (exiled to Kazakhstan in 1941) archeological excavations carried out in numerous mounds here in the 1920s and 1930s are of exceptional importance in the study of the ancient history of Azerbaijan, being radically different from the research of his predecessors.

In 2018 the Ganja-Goygol archaeological expedition led by archaeologist Arif Mammadov conducted archaeological excavations and field research in the Goygol District.

The main archaeological excavations were carried out in the territory of Gushgara municipality of the Goygol District, in the area near the Heydar Aliyev park in Ganja City, on the right side of the Ganja-Shamkir road, on the left side of Dry Gobu, and in the mound-type graves in the territory of Gushgara municipality. The results of the excavations show that the monuments presented as kurgans are just kurgan-type graves and reflect the customs and lifestyle of the nomadic tribes of the Late Bronze Age of Azerbaijan.

== See also ==
- Goygol
- Kurgan
