= Heydar Aliyev Park, Ganja =

Park in Ganja, Azerbaijan

- Interactive map of Heydar Aliyev Park, Ganja
- Type: Public park
- Location: Ganja, Azerbaijan
- Area: 450 hectares (1,100 acres)
- Opened: 2014
- Status: Open year round
- Website: www.heydaraliyevcenterganja.com

The Heydar Aliyev Park Complex (Azerbaijani: Heydər Əliyev Park-Kompleksi) is the largest urban park in Ganja, Azerbaijan located on an area of 450 hectares. It includes within its boundaries fountains and decorated garden plots, an amphitheater, “Triumphal arch”, Youth Center, Heydar Aliyev Center, Museum of Modern Art, a waterfall and an artificial lake in addition to thousands of trees. The Park Complex was opened in 2014.

== History ==
The park was primarily founded as a “Memorial park” in March 1979 in the result of planting trees for the first time in the field called “Quru Qobu” of Yeni Ganja residential area by a group of people from Ganja during a rally. That Park started to be called “Heydar Park” dedicated to the late president of Azerbaijan, Heydar Aliyev after he visited Ganja in 1980 as the First Secretary of the Central Committee of the Communist Party of Azerbaijan SSR and planted plane trees in this park.

The reconstruction of the park started in 2012. Between 2012 and 2014, the park expanded and transformed into a park complex covering an area of 450 hectares with 2 km length. An amphitheater, “Triumphal arch”, a youth center, Heydar Aliyev Center, Museum of Modern Art, children's entertainment area and an artificial lake were constructed, trees were planted within the boundaries of the park during the reconstruction period. The park complex inaugurated in January 2014.

== Description ==
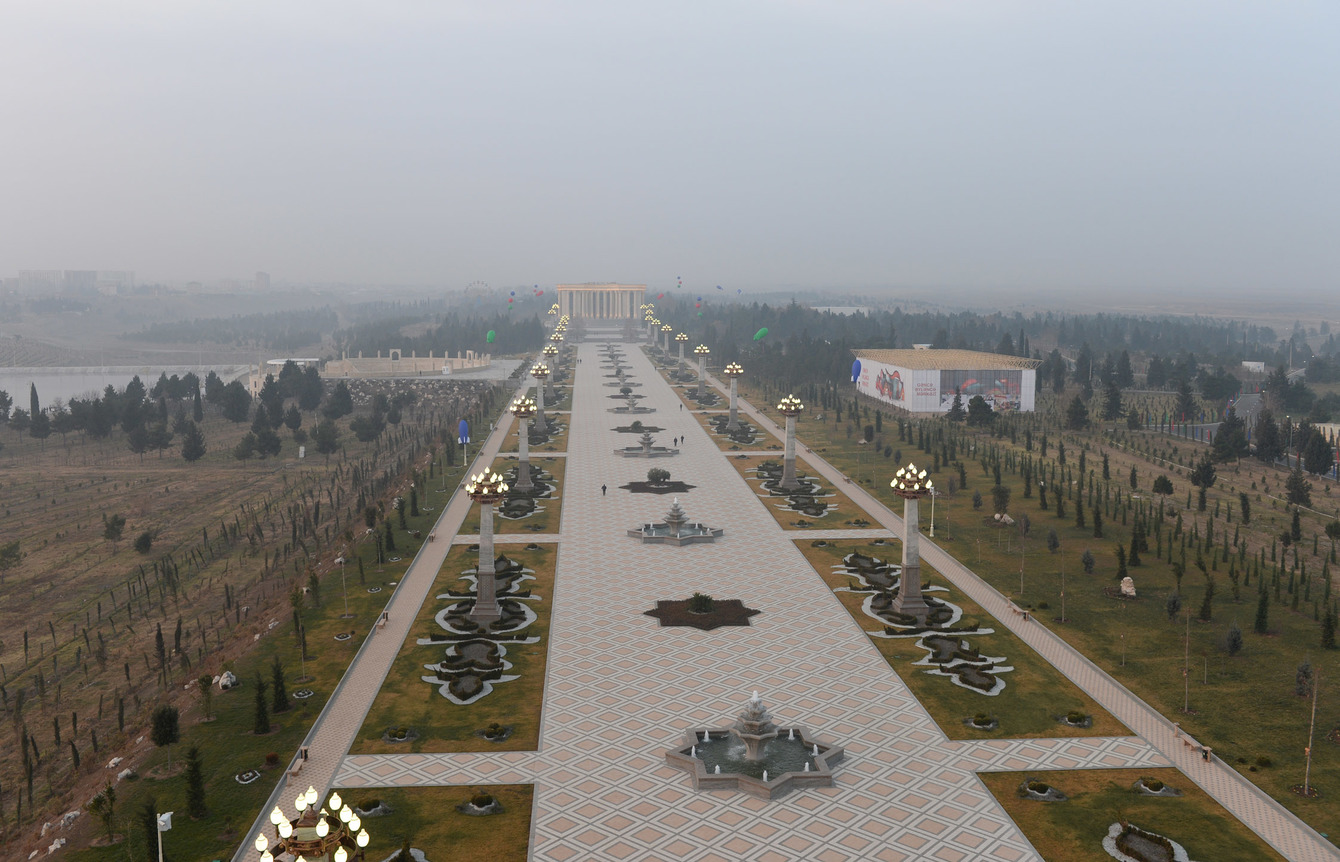
The Main alley of the Park

The park contains more than 350 thousand trees and decorative plants, including Oriental plane, pine, spruce, tilia and fruit trees, as well as, 17 fountains, 32 decorated garden plots, a 4-step waterfall, and statues and monuments of outstanding Azerbaijani poets, writers and public figures, including statues to Nizami Ganjavi, Mahsati Ganjavi, Mirza Shafi Vazeh and Samad Vurghun. There is also a cycling road in 7 kilometers long passing throughout the Park complex.

=== Facilities ===
The structures within the park complex include:

Triumphal Arch in Heydar Aliyev Park, Ganja

- The Main Alley with 53 meters width and 1400 meters length, passing through the Triumphal Arch, continues to the end of the complex where it leads to the Heydar Aliyev Center. The 16 fountains of the park are lined with 24 decorative 12.6 meters height lamp posts made of granite in this alley.
- Triumphal Arch – was constructed on an area 1100 sq.m with the width of 20 meters, the length of 50 meters, and the height of 38 meters on the pan stones. It has two facades – east and west. Glasses prettified with geometric ornaments have been used to decorate the central part of the facades. The walls are encircled by 24 columns from all sides. The structure consists of 7 floors and 6 open balconies. There are staircases and an elevator to reach the top where a museum, an observation deck and a resting place are located.
- Heydar Aliyev Center - built between 2012 and 2014 is located at the end of the main alley. The four-story building on an area of 2263 m2 is encircled with octagonal columns along the center perimeter. The height of this structure is 24.3 m. The flag of Azerbaijan is installed on the glass ceiling of the center. There is a memorial museum, a library, a reading hall, different conference rooms, and dance, carpet-weaving training centers in the building. In front of the center, a statue to Heydar Aliyev has been placed.
- The Amphitheater - considered for organizing large open-air events for up to 5000 people. The pillars on the edges of the structure have been decorated with national ornaments.
- Ganja Youth Center – The building was inaugurated in May 2016 with the aim of organizing different events and involving young people in various career, personal development, sport and art activities. The building occupying 975 sq.m. has 3 storeys.
- Ganjland, the children's amusement park is the entertainment component of the Park operating since 2015.

== Gallery ==
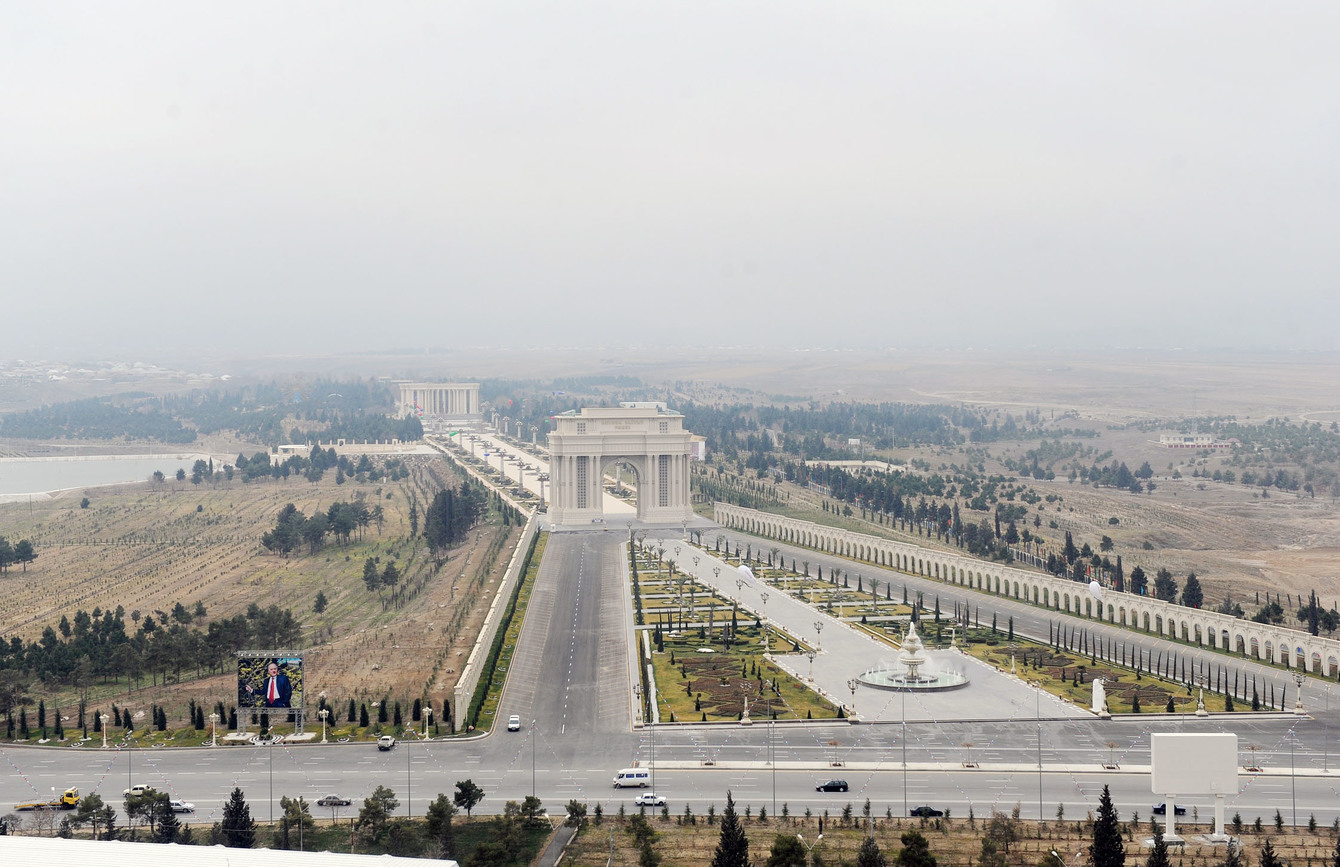
Overview of the Park-complex

Night view of the park

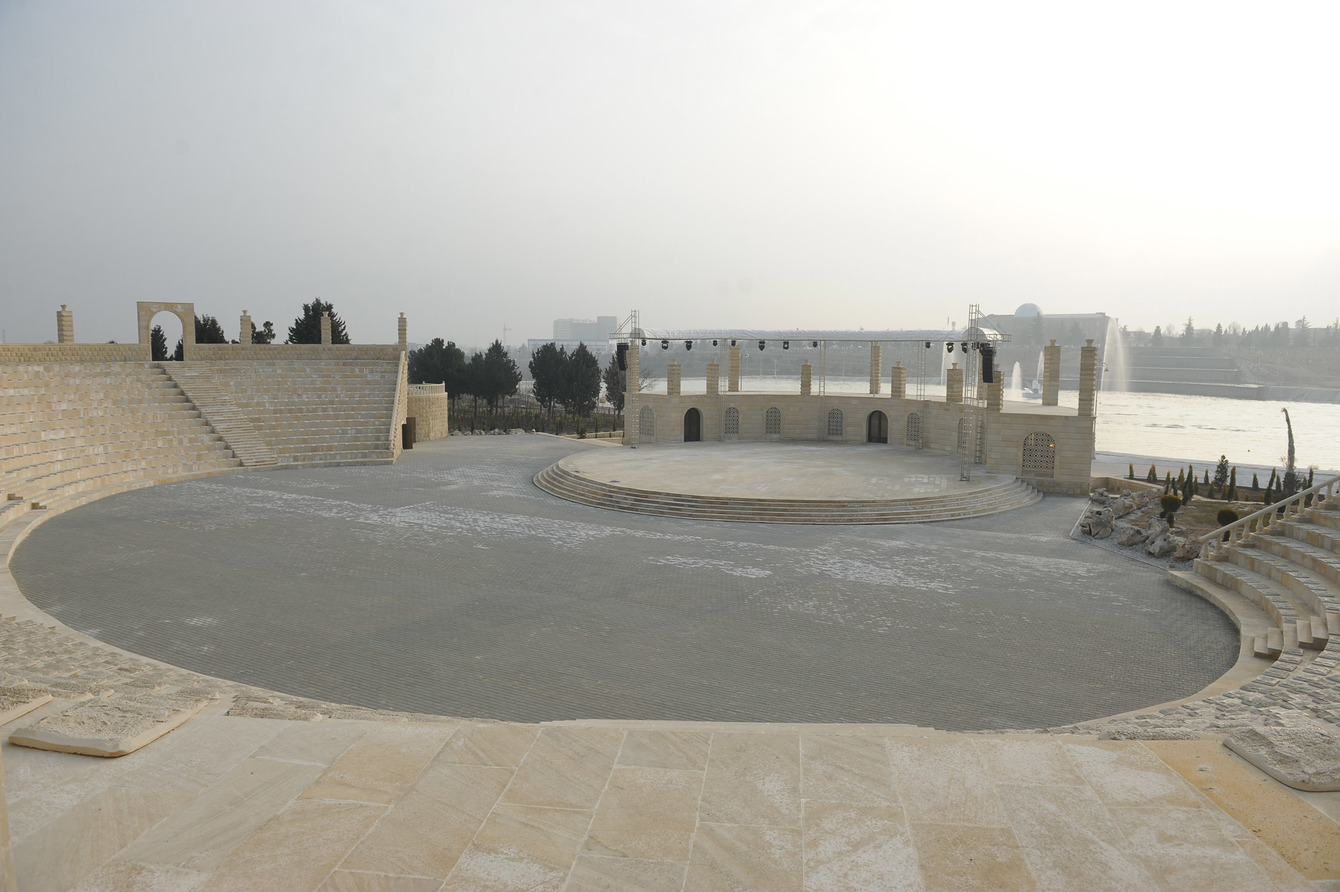
Amphitheatre

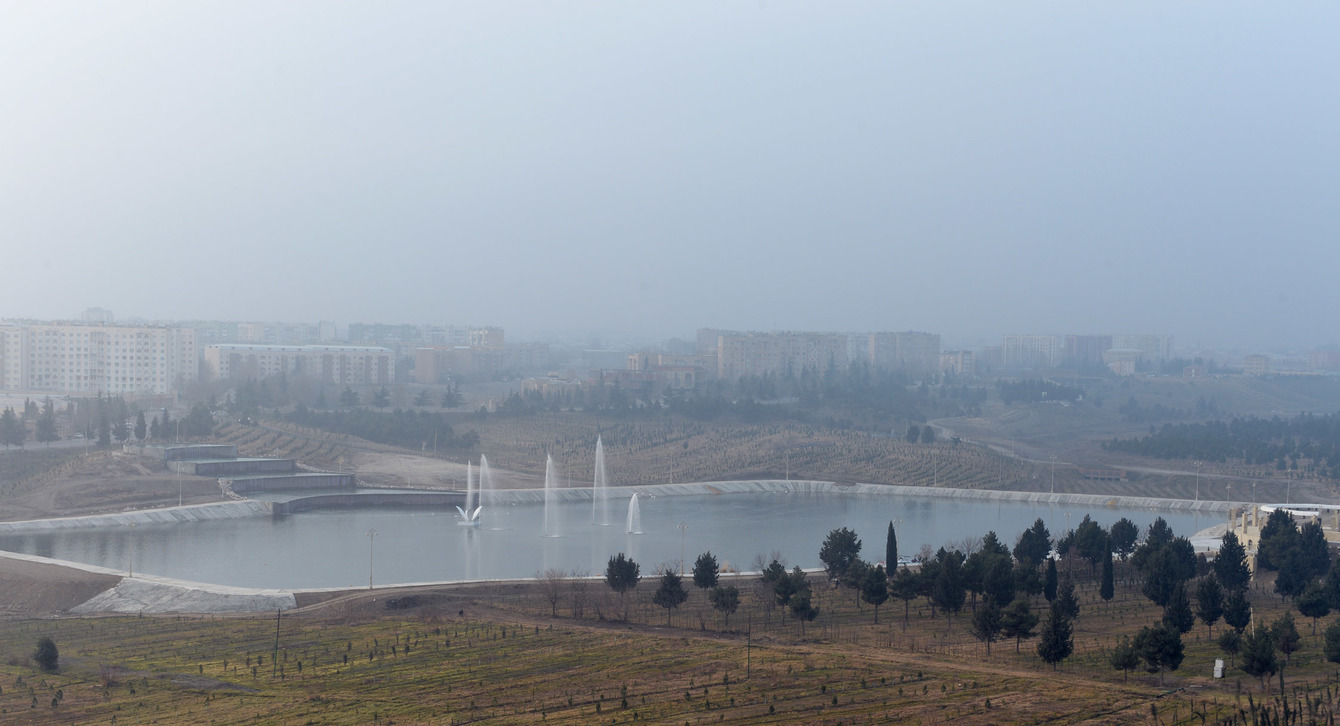
The lake created in the park-complex

Heydar Aliyev Center

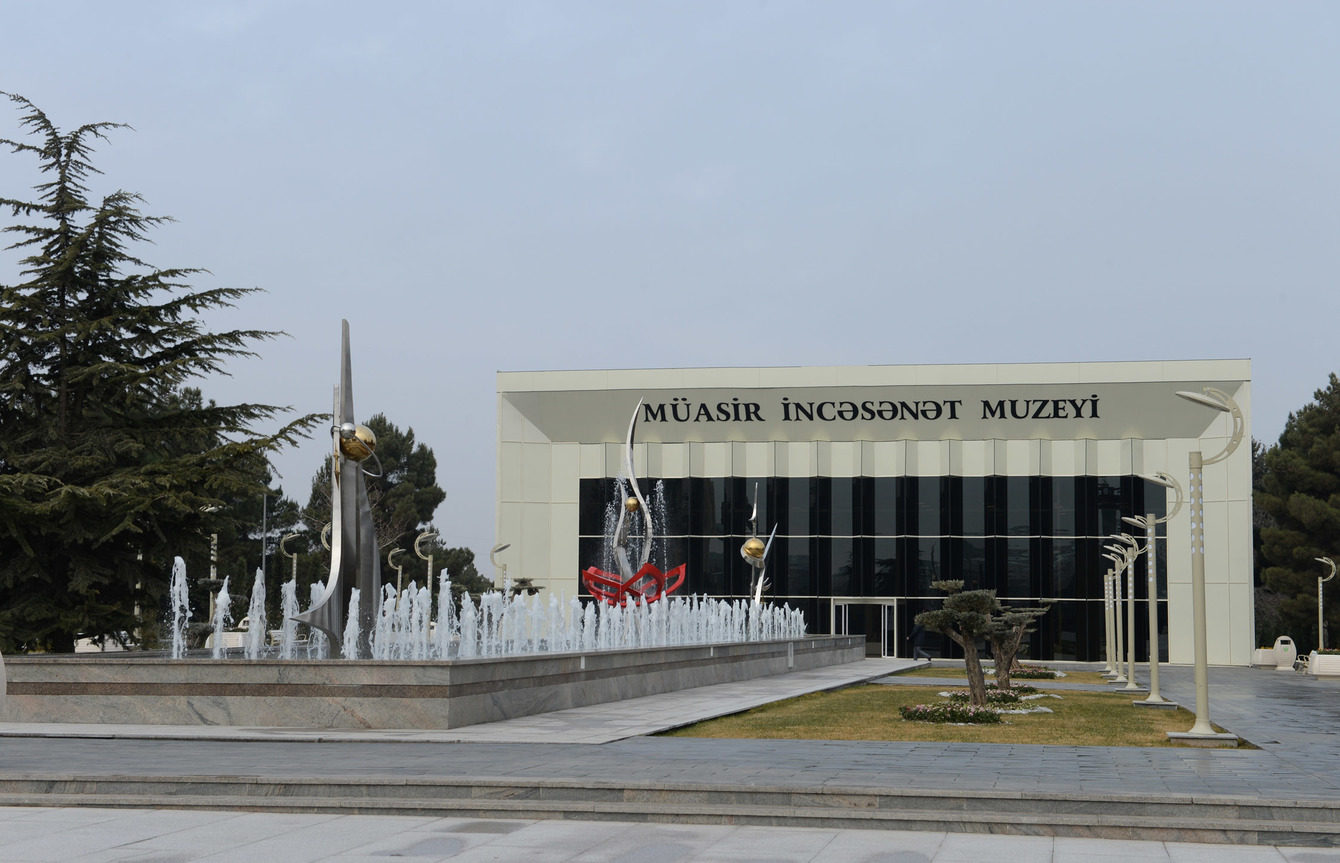
Museum of Modern Art

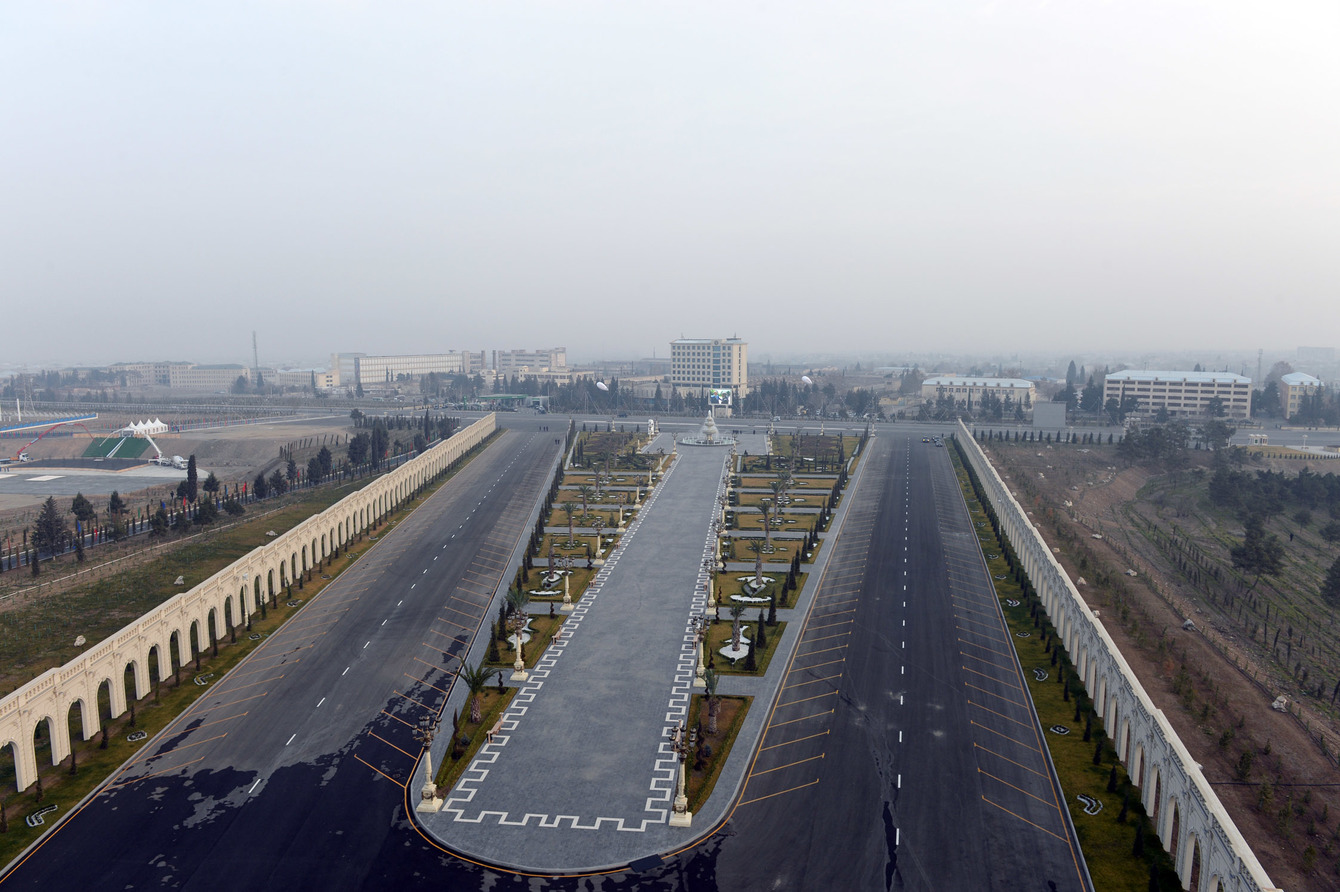
The view of the entrance of the Park from the observation deck of the Triumphal Arch

== See also ==
- Tourist attractions in Ganja
- Culture of Azerbaijan
