= Chokak Hamam =

Historical bath in Ganja, Azerbaijan

Chokak Hamam (Bath)
- Çökək hamam (Azerbaijani); حمامِ کوچه (Persian)
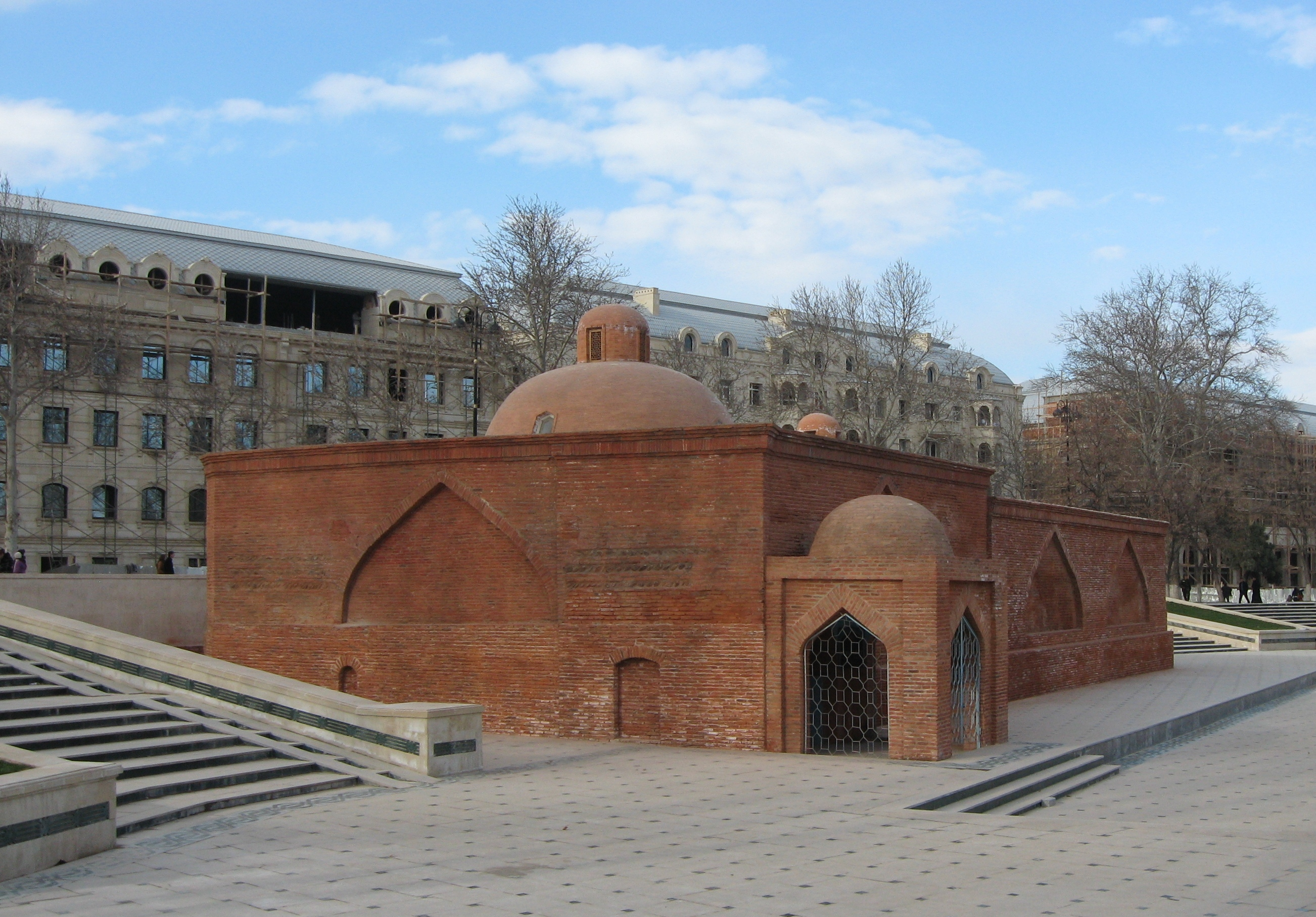

- Location within Azerbaijan
- 40.6773°N 46.3582°E
- Location: Ganja, Azerbaijan

History
- Built: 1606
- Original use: Bath

Site notes
- Architect: Sheikh Bahaddin Mahammad Amil
- Restored: 2003
- Governing body: Vego Hotel, Ganja
- Owner: Vego Hotel, Ganja

Chokak Hamam (Azerbaijani: Çökək hamam, "fallen bath"; Persian: حمامِ کوچه, romanized: Hammām-e Kucheh, lit. 'Bathhouse of the alley') is a historical bath near Juma Mosque in Ganja. Historical-architectural monument built in 1606, by order of Iranian Shah Abbas.

The bathhouse was included in the list of immovable historical and cultural monuments of local significance by the decision No. 132 of the Cabinet of Ministers of the Republic of Azerbaijan on August 2, 2001.

== Naming ==
The Chokak hamam is known by various names among the city's population. Since it was built by the order of Shah Abbas I, it is sometimes called the "Shah Abbas hamam." Due to its proximity to the Shah Abbas Mosque, it is also referred to as the "Mosque Bathhouse," and later it became known as the "Haji Alakbar Bathhouse" after the person who operated it. The name "Chokak " (meaning "sunken") comes from the fact that the bathhouse was built in a sunken area to ensure water pressure.

== History ==
After the completion of the Juma Mosque in 1606, by the order of Safavid ruler Shah Abbas I, the construction of the Chokak Bathhouse began nearby. The architect of the bathhouse was Sheikh Bahaeddin, who was also the architect of many monuments in Ganja.

== Architecture ==
In the construction of the bathhouse, traditional materials of the time were used, such as red bricks, egg whites, clay, and a lime-based binding mixture. The bathhouse consists of two interconnected halls. Inside the larger hall, there is a pool and a fountain, while the smaller hall is designated for washing. The bathhouse has two large domes and five smaller domes. Semi-domes, which serve as ventilation, were built around the large domes. The bathhouse remains warm in the winter and cool in the summer. In the basement, there were two steam boilers heated by wood. Steam was distributed to the halls through ceramic pipes embedded in the walls and floors, ensuring even heat circulation throughout all the rooms. This system remained in use until 1963.

After Azerbaijan regained its independence, in 1996, artist Galib Baghirov established a Decorative Applied Arts Center within the bathhouse, where he created and exhibited ceramic pottery. The bathhouse was included in the list of immovable historical and cultural monuments of local significance by the decision No. 132 of the Cabinet of Ministers of the Republic of Azerbaijan on August 2, 2001.

== Restoration ==
The monument was restored in 2013, with efforts made to preserve its historical authenticity. The restoration work was carried out using old bricks, and the damaged dome and roof were repaired. After the restoration, the bathhouse became operational again. However, its use by a hotel and the fact that access to the bathhouse is only available through the hotel has been met with public disapproval.

== Gallery ==
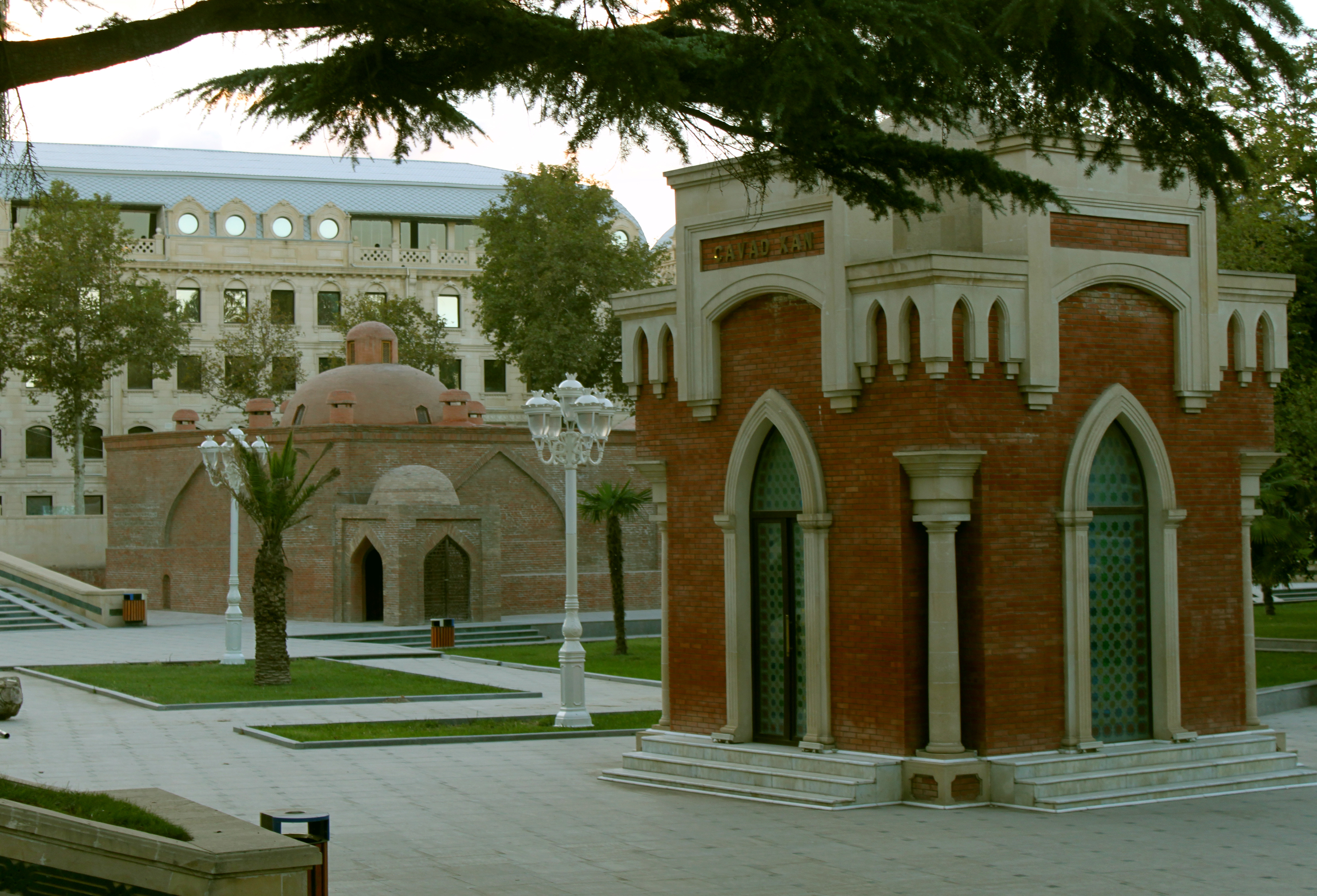
Chokak Bath and Javad khan's tomb

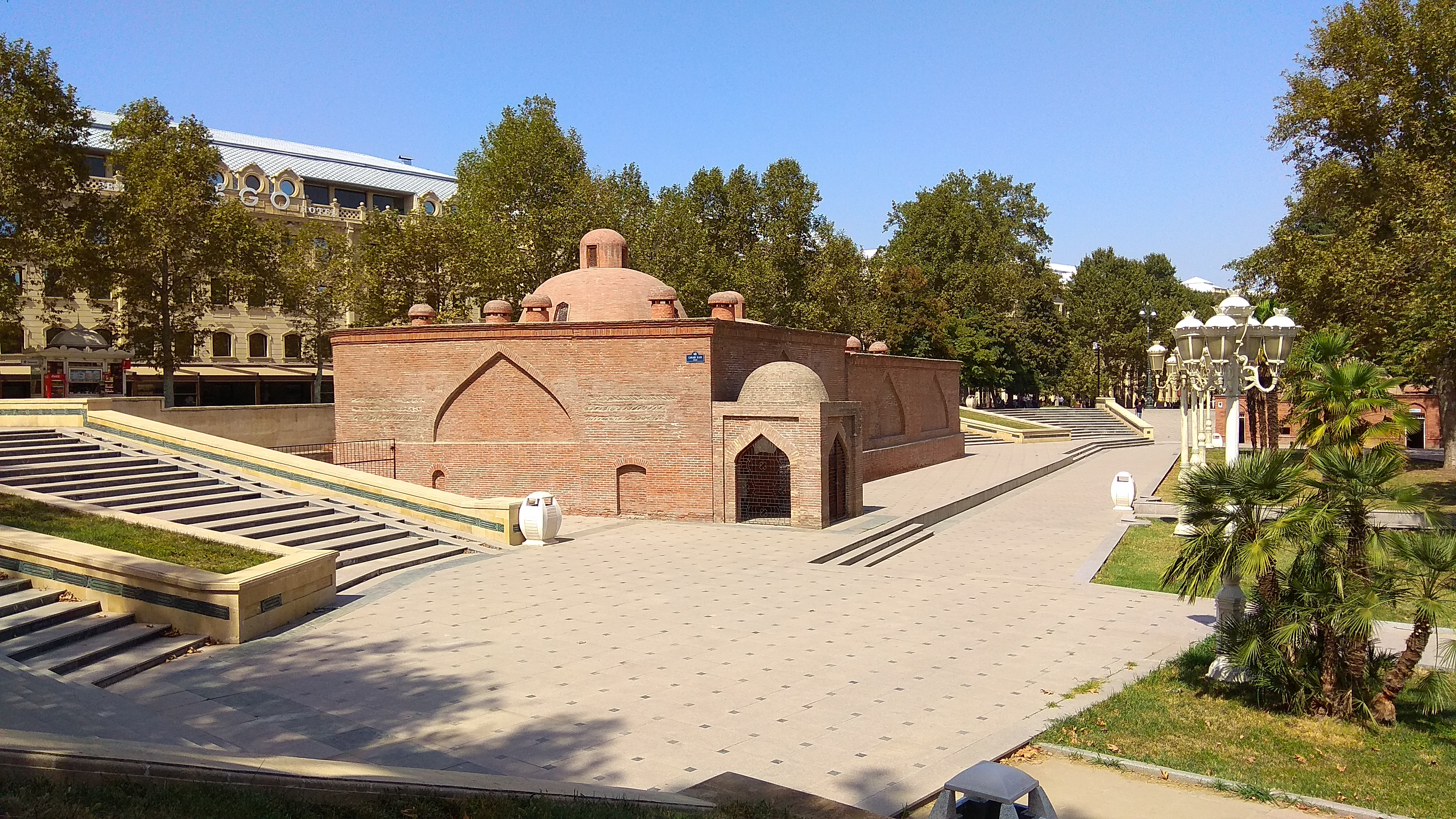

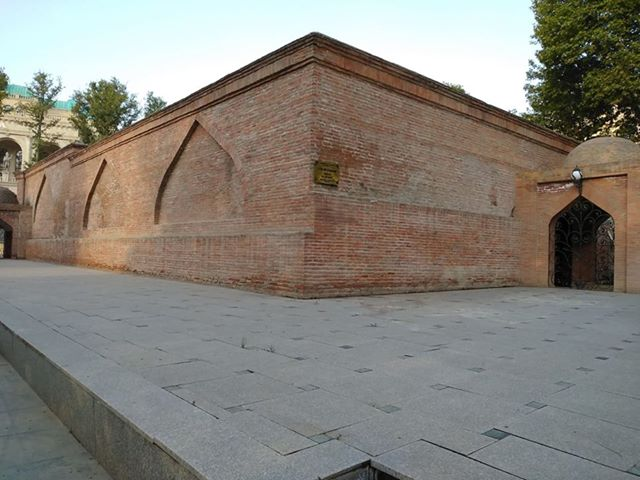

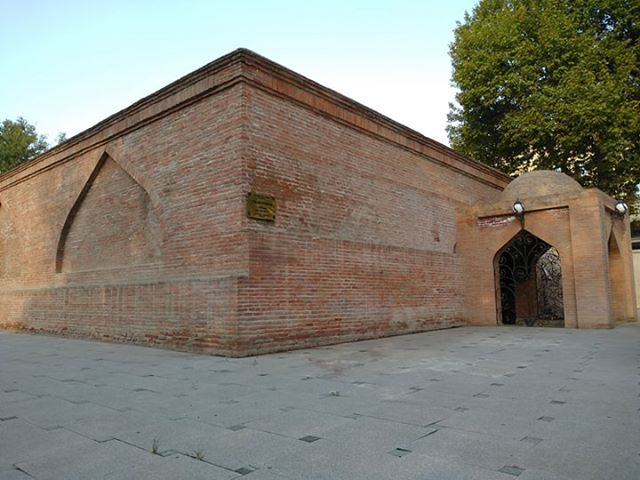

== See also ==
- Juma Mosque
- Tomb of Javad khan
- Tourist attractions in Ganja
