= Hacıkənd (Ganja) =

Hajikend
- Azerbaijani: Hacıkənd
- Location within Azerbaijan
- Coordinates: 40°30′49″N 46°19′44″E
- Country: Azerbaijan
- City: Ganja
- Time zone: UTC+4 (AZT)
  - Summer (DST): UTC+5 (AZT)

Hajikend (Azerbaijani: Hacıkənd) is a town in the administrative-territorial unit of Kapaz raion of Ganja, Azerbaijan. It has an area of 107 hectares and population of 489.

== Location ==
Hajikend is situated 23 km south of Ganja, on the north-eastern of the Lesser Caucasus mountains, 1000 meters above the sea level. Its area is 107 hectares. Hajikend is located in the Kurekchay river basin of Murov mountains.

== Overview ==
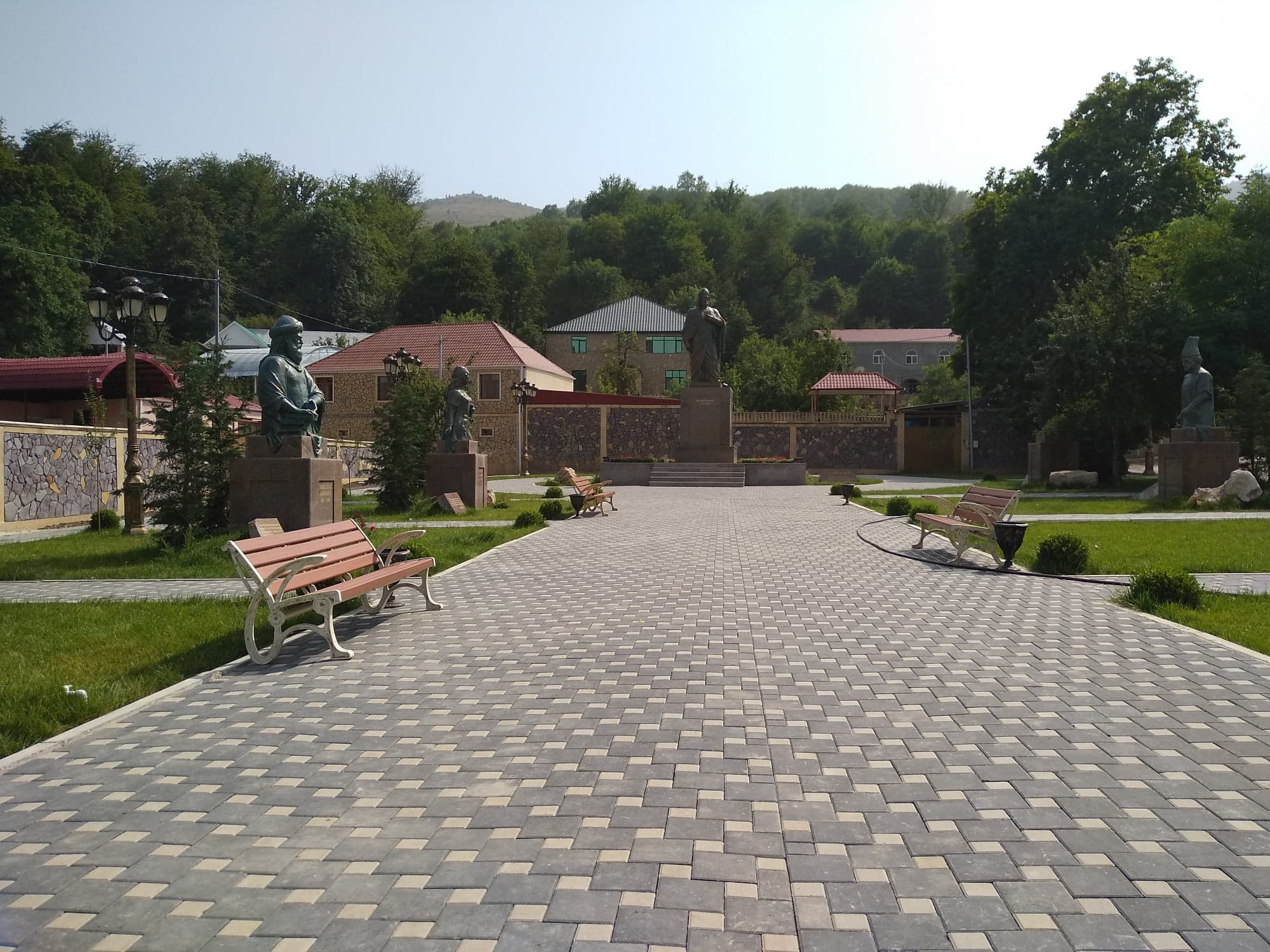
Park named "The predecessors and successors of Nizami Ganjavi"

Hajikend has been a major resort zone for residents of Ganja and surrounding areas over years. There are 4 historic monuments dates back to the 19th century in Hajikend: Governor’s house, Governor’s office, house of Forer brothers and Russian Orthodox Church.

The building of Russian Orthodox Church has been restored and put in to use as a library in 2018. This building was built in 1893 and used to serve to Russian officials who came Hajikend to rest.

The library of Hajikend has been functioning since 1956. It has a collection of 14368 books in Azerbaijan, as well as in other languages.

The Park named “The predecessors and successors of Nizami Ganjavi” was opened here in June 2018. There are a total of 17 monuments of prominent historical figures lived in Ganja, including Mahsati Ganjavi, Mirza Shafi Vazeh, Abul Ula Ganjavi, Givami Ganjavi, Usta Bender, Sheykh Zaman, Dokhtari Khatibi Ganjavi, Afrasiab, and Omar Ganji. The sculptor of the statues in the park is Asef Hasanov.

“Arfa Hotel” has been building in Hajikend since 2014. In the construction of the hotel, red bricks were used in accordance with the local architectural traditions of Ganja.

== See also ==
- Ganja, Azerbaijan
- Hajikend, Kalbajar
