= Nizami Ganjavi Ganja State History-Ethnography Museum =

Ganja State History-Ethnography Museum named after Nizami Ganjavi
- Nizami Gəncəvi adına Tarix-Diyarşünaslıq Muzeyi
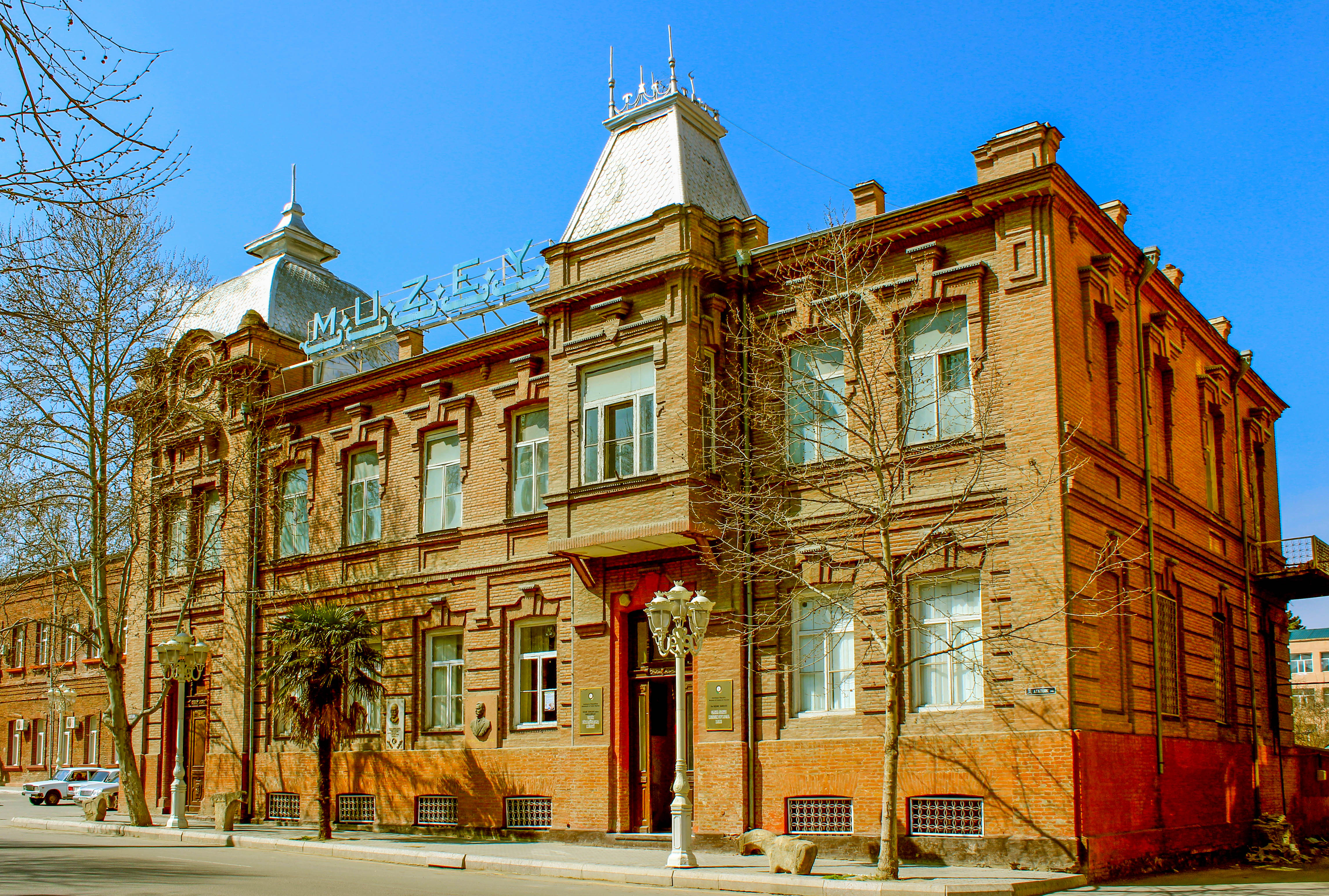
- Established: 1924
- Location: Ganja, Azerbaijan
- Coordinates: 40°40′49″N 46°21′28″E
- Type: History museum

Ganja State History-Ethnography Museum named after Nizami Ganjavi (Azerbaijani: Nizami Gəncəvi adına Tarix-Diyarşünaslıq Muzeyi) is the largest museum in Ganja,

== Overview ==
The museum is located in the former mansion of descendants of the last independent khan of Ganja. It was founded in 1924 and includes more than 30000 exhibits – the history of Ganja from ancient period till modern times, archaeological finds, and material-cultural monuments, ethnographic, epigraphic, and numismatic collections displayed in 18 halls.

== History ==
Ganja State History-Ethnography Museum was established in 1924. An active group of professors and students of Ganja Seminary Jafarzada I., Seyidov S., Rafibeyov J., Malikov F. and others played an important role in the foundation process. In the early years, the museum had two departments, ethnography and agriculture, with more than 500 exhibits.

In 1954, Ganja Museum was moved to the address of Azizbeyov 260, when the museum consisted of seven large halls, and three departments: natural science, pre-revolution, and Soviet period.

In 1961, the Goygol and Ganja museums were consolidated. The current building of the museum was put into use as a museum in 1972.

== Building ==
This building was the private property of the last independent khan of Ganja khanate Javad khan's descendants Ismail khan Ziyadkhanov and Adil khan Ziyadkhanov. Adil and Ismail were the sons of Javad khan's grandson Abulfat khan Ziyadkhanov. The property was built in the 19th century and was confiscated by Soviet authorities like other properties after the Azerbaijan Democratic Republic fell. Different offices and organizations located in this building during the Soviet period.

The building retains its grandeur as a living history of Ganja Khanate and Azerbaijan Democratic Republic period (1918–1920).

== Exhibits ==
The main foundation of the museum contains 24,785 exhibits, divided as follows: 4,483 in archaeology, 1,648 in numerical ethnography, 392 in artistry, 9 sculptures, 2,753 photographs, 9,59 documents, 3441 numismatic collection, 1984 books, 816 exhibits related to patriotism. A woman skeleton up to 220 cm high and accessories, as well as household items buried with her dated back to the 2nd millennium BC, Silver crown of Caucasian Albania era, lanterns discovered around Nizami Ganjavi's grave, Ganja rugs, the flag of Ganja Khanate, coins related to different periods of Azerbaijan history, jewelry, pottery, metalworking samples are among them.

The area of the museum is 972 m^{2}, consisting of two departments - ancient period and modern period.

== Ganja Fortress Gates ==

Monumental complex Ganja Fortress Gates - the Museum of Archaeology and Ethnography is located on the entrance to the eastern direction of Ganja on the Baku-Gazakh highway. The fortress was built on both sides of the highway and its total length is 50 meters with bastions of 22 meters. The main 5-storey part of the fortress is considered 7-storey with the plinth. The tunnel, which is 62 meters long, connects the two fortresses. The complex includes 2 iron gates, a gallery of the portraits of outstanding figures from Ganja, Military History Museum of Ganja, ethnographic museum dedicated to the lifestyle and culture of the population Ganja in the Complex. The gates have been made on the sketches of ancient Ganja gates made by master Ibrahim Osmanoghlu in 1063 which were damaged in the result of 1139 Ganja earthquake and kept in Gelati Monastery of Kutaisi after Demetrius I of Georgia took it.

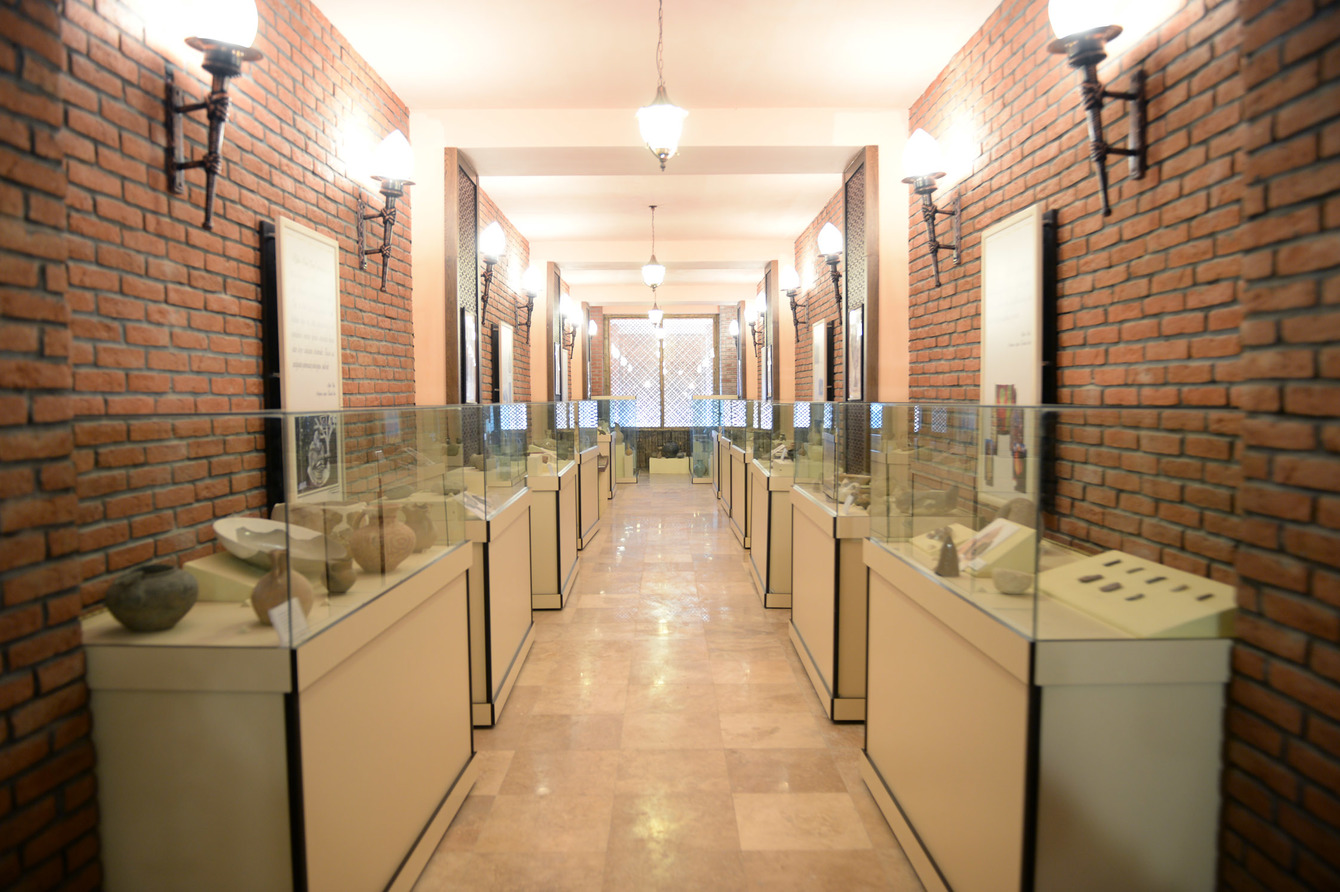

The monumental complex Ganja Fortress Gates were constructed between 2012 and 2014 in accordance with the Azerbaijani President Ilham Aliyev's order.

On the 1st floor, a portrait gallery consisting of portraits of predecessors and successors of great Azerbaijani poet Nizami Ganjavi were placed. Furthermore, monuments were raised in honor of 26 outstanding personalities from Ganja. On the 2nd floor, there is a museum of the military history of Ganja. This museum chronologically characterizes the military history of Ganja from ancient times to 1918–1920. In addition, arms and ammunition of the time and a picture of a 1919 fighter of the Ganja garrison were displayed in the section called "Military History of Ganja in 1918-1920". Moreover, photos of fighters and the "Eternal Flame" for the people who died for their country were exhibited in a different section. An ethnographic museum depicting the life and culture of the people of Ganja is on the 3rd floor. The exposition gives information about the craftsmanship history of Ganja which had more than 30 craft industries. Rugs, the traditional oriental tea table, pottery, copper products and other ethnographic objects are displayed in this section. The 4th floor of the exhibition highlights Ganja's ancient and rich cooking culture and the traditions of hospitality. Additionally, paintings and photos of first ancient state important buildings can be found here. Besides, it is possible to enter the fortress bastions from the 4th floor. Clothes and jewelry from a variety of Azerbaijan's regions are displayed in the "Azerbaijani national costumes" exhibition. In addition, more than 120 valuable archaeological artifacts from various regions of the country are shown in the exhibition "Azerbaijan – the land of ancient civilization".

== Gallery ==
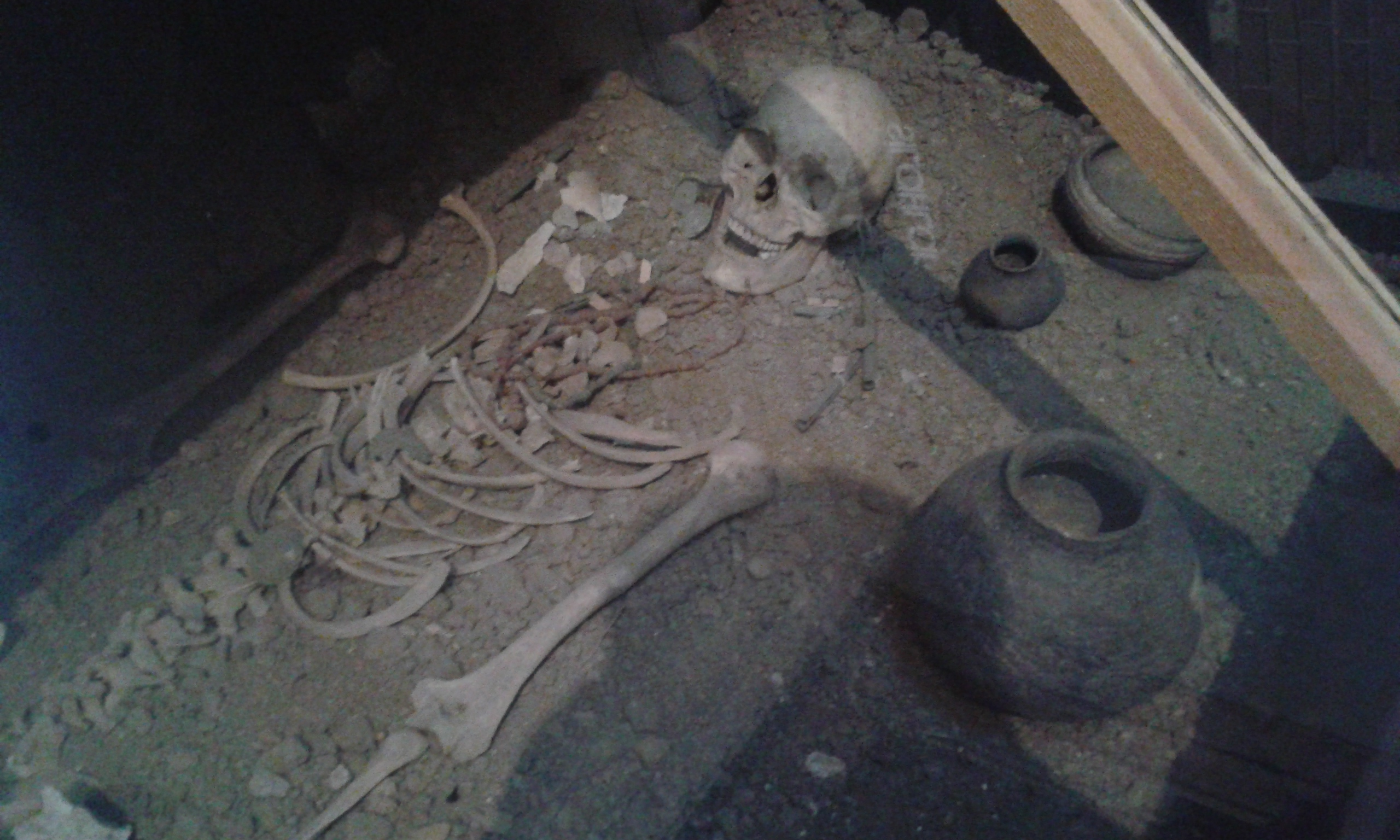

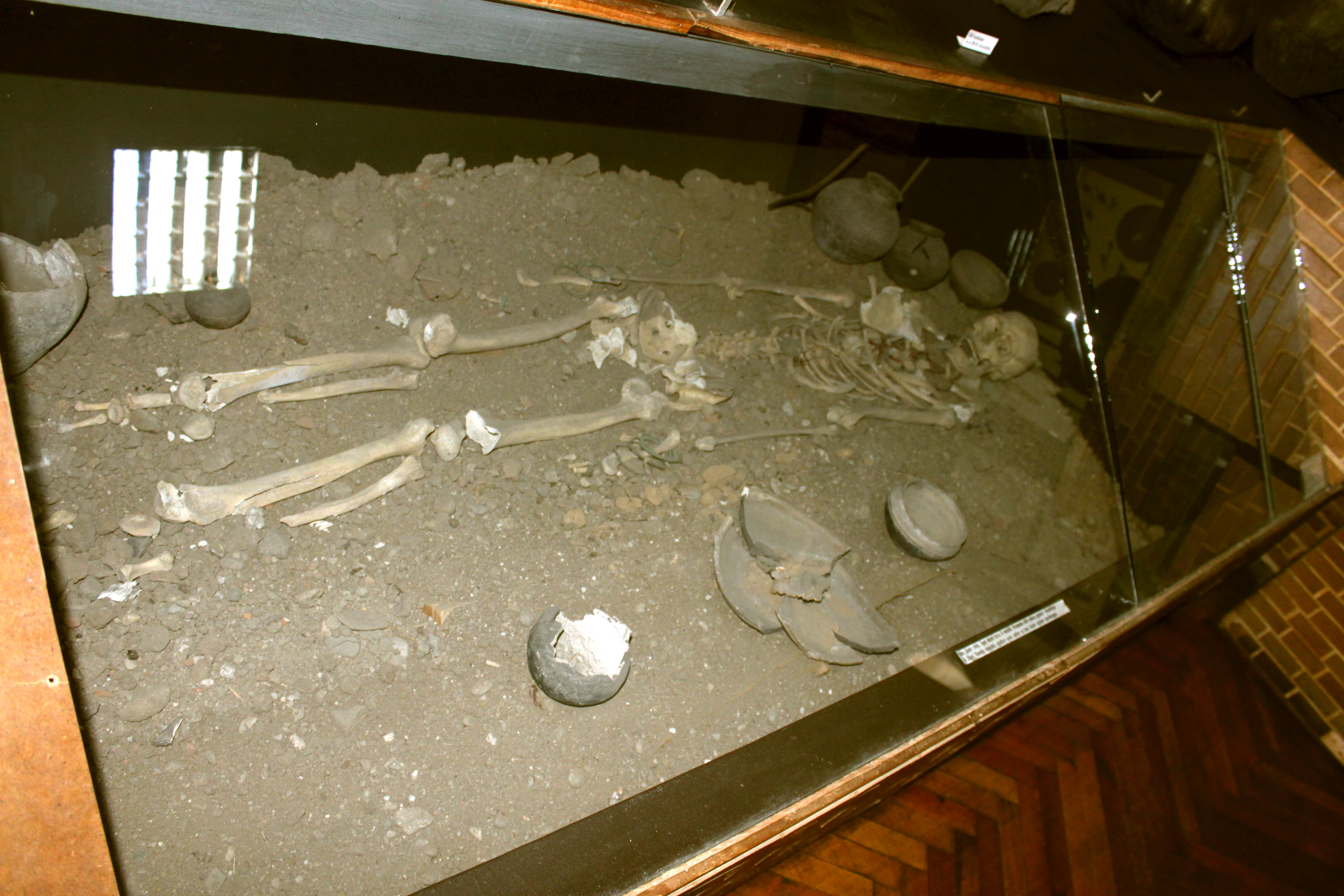

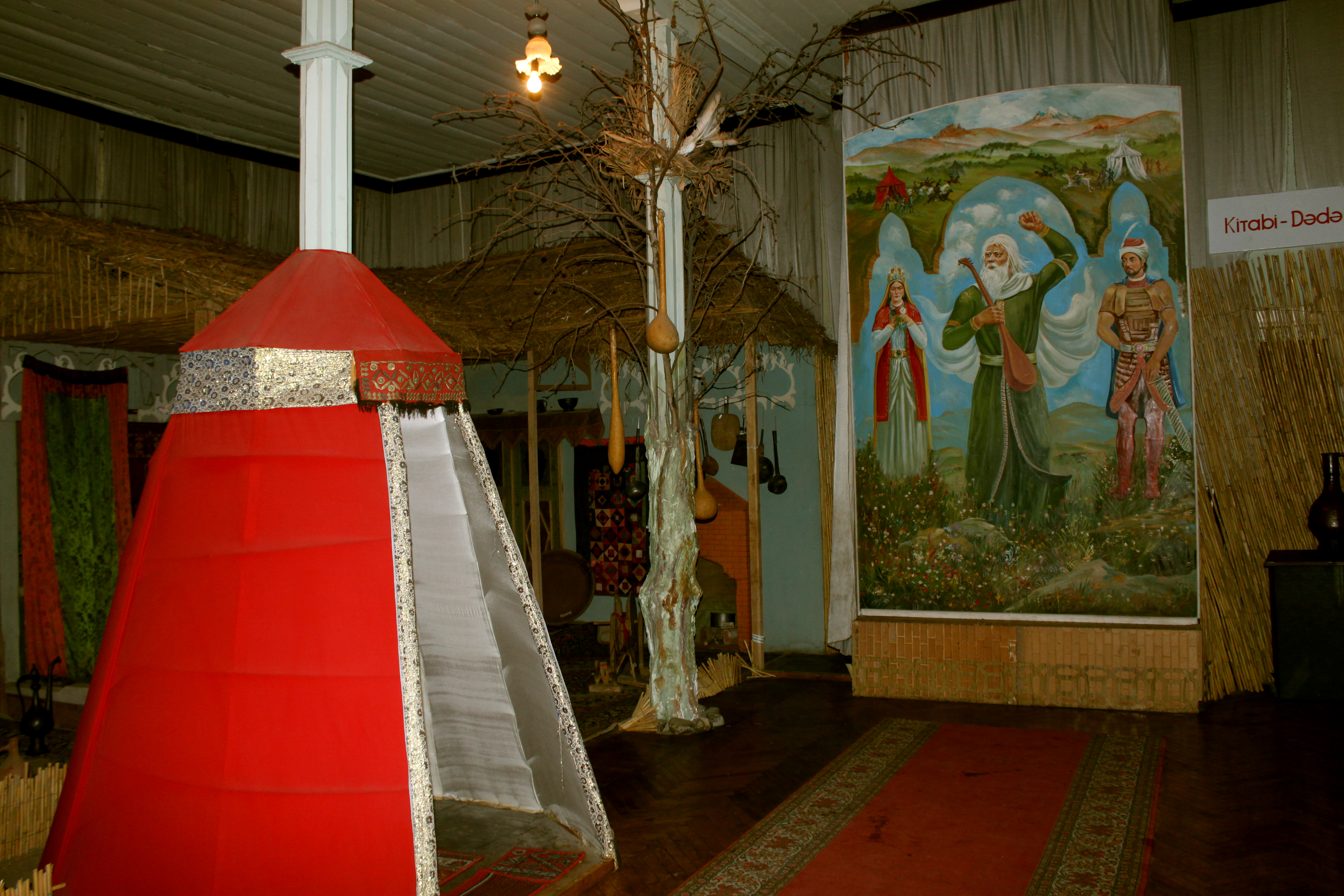

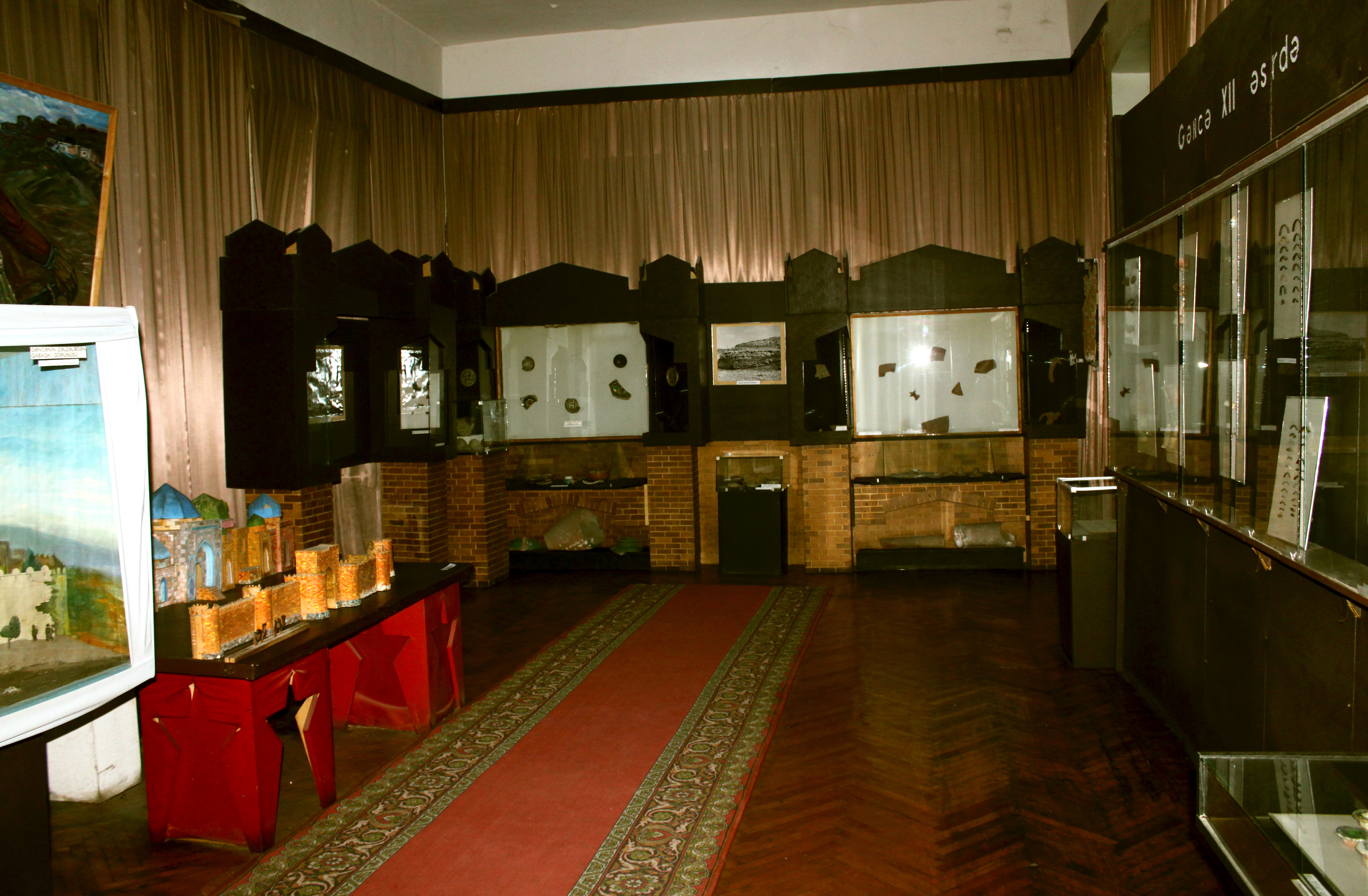

== See also ==
- List of museums in Azerbaijan
- National Museum of History of Azerbaijan
