= Ganja State Philharmonic Hall =

Concert hall in Ganja, Azerbaijan

Ganja State Philharmonic Hall named after Fikret Amirov
- Fikrət Əmirov adına Gəncə Dövlət Filarmoniyası
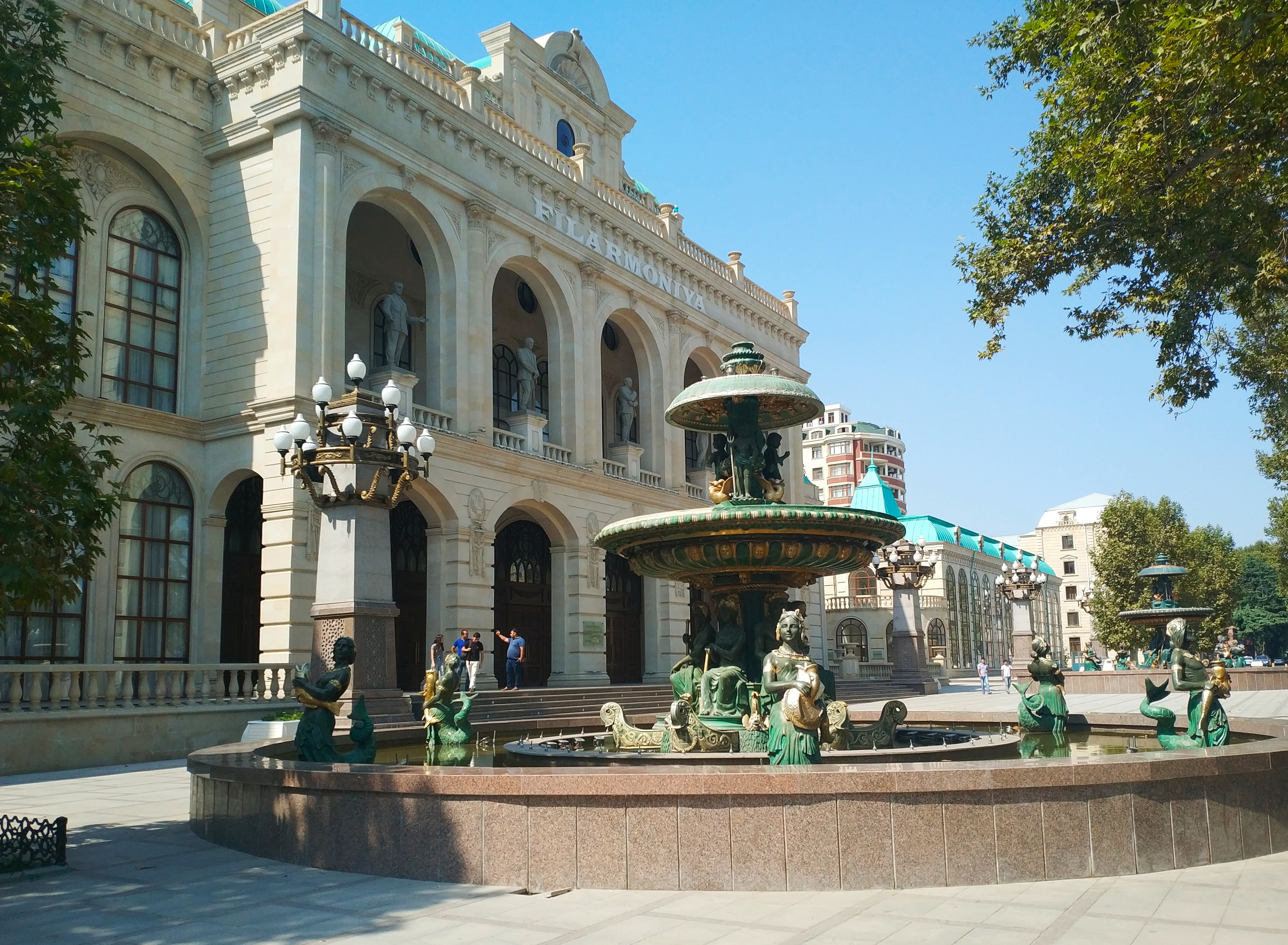
- Interactive map of Ganja State Philharmonic Hall named after Fikret Amirov
- Location: Ganja, Azerbaijan
- Coordinates: 40°40′36″N 46°21′30″E
- Capacity: 1200 (main stage)
- Type: Concert hall
- Event: Classical

Construction
- Opened: 2017 (new building)

Ganja State Philharmonic Hall (Azerbaijani: Gəncə Dövlət Filarmoniyası) is a concert hall in Ganja, Azerbaijan. Ganja State Philharmonic is named after the composer Fikret Amirov who was born in Ganja in 1922 and directed the Philharmonic for a while (1942-1943).

== Formation ==
Ganja Philharmonic was founded in April 1919 on the initiative of well-known Azerbaijani composer Uzeyir Hajibeyov after his visit to Ganja in March 1919.Fikret Amirov became the new director of the Philharmonic after he returned from Great Patriotic War in 1942. The Philharmonic was directed by Mahammad Burjaliyev until its termination in 1949. The first symphonic orchestra in Ganja was established by Shirin Rzayev in 1969.

In 1969, People’s Artist Fikret Verdiyev founded amateur “Goygol” song and dance ensemble which was given “state” status in 1977 and became “Goygol State Song and Dance Ensemble”. Ganja State Philharmonic was reestablished on the base of Goygol State Song and Dance Ensemble in 1990. Shirin Rzayev appointed as the director of the newly established Philharmonic Hall. Folk Instruments Orchestra was founded in Ganja by Shirin Rzayev and Elchin Elchiyev during that period.

Ganja State Philharmonic is subordinated to the Ministry of Culture of Azerbaijan.

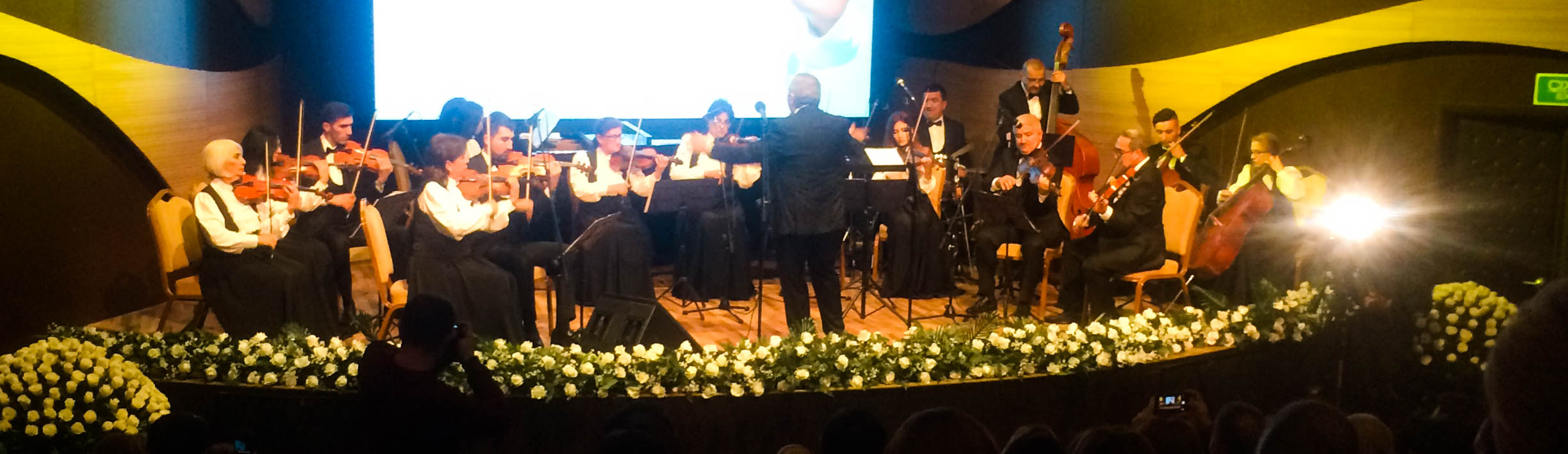
The Chamber Orchestra of the Ganja State Philharmonic performing at International Mugham Center of Azerbaijan

=== Collectives ===
The following musical collectives operate under the Philharmonic Society of Ganja:

- Goygol State Song and Dance Ensemble
- Folk Instruments Orchestra
- Ganja State Chamber Orchestra

== Location ==
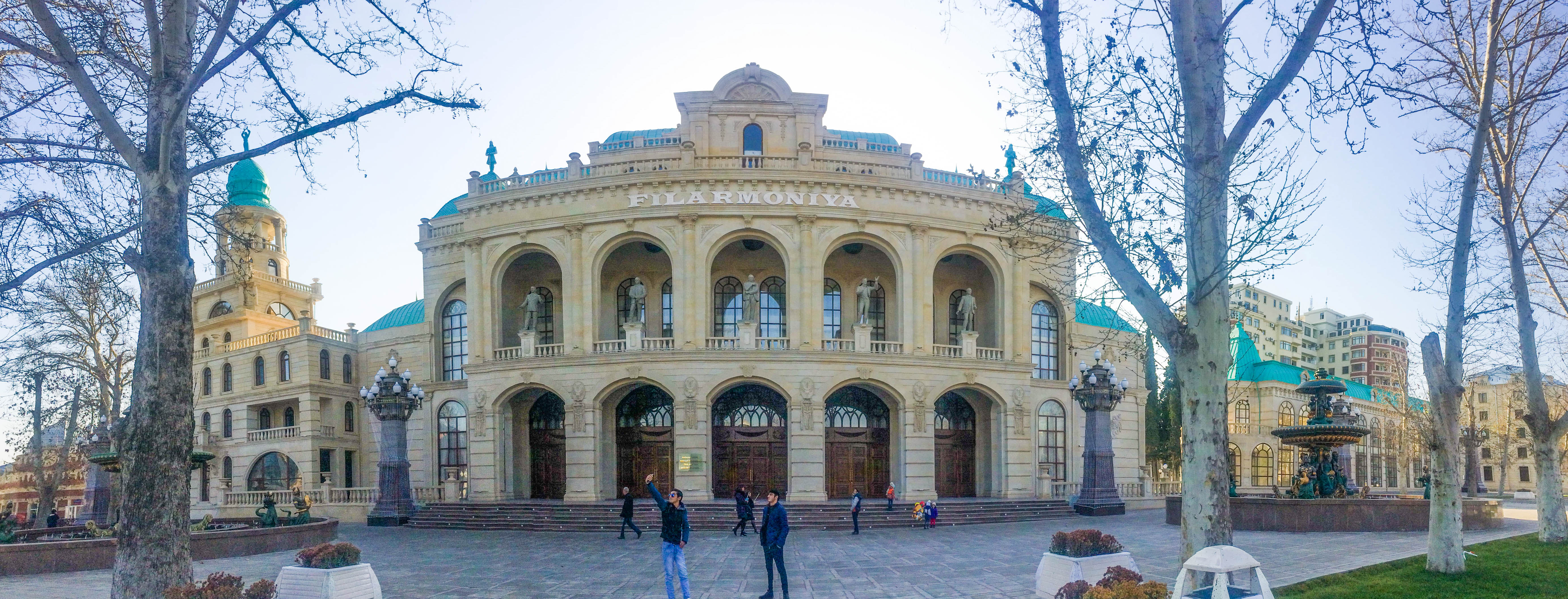
Panoramic view of Ganja State Philharmonic Hall

The former building of Ganja State Philharmonic located at 135 Attarlar street was constructed in 1985. In 2012, it was decided to dismantle that building because it was in emergency situation. Therefore, new building of the Ganja Philharmonic Society replacing the building of Baku Movie Theater and Children’s Creative Center was constructed between 2012 and 2017 based on the project of the architect Ramiz Huseynov. The new building located at the intersection of the streets of Javadkhan and Hasan bay Zardabi was inaugurated on November 10, 2017.

=== New building ===
The new 6-storey building consists of the main concert hall for orchestral performances with 1200 seats, a conference hall for 300 seats, 11 loges, as well as administrative, training, make-up and recreation rooms. The balcony of the concert hall on the third floor features the statutes to the famous Azerbaijani composers Uzeyir Hajibeyov, Fikrat Amirov, Gara Garayev, Niyazi and Arif Malikov.

There is also an open-air concert stage, an observation tower, a 2-storey gallery and two fountains decorated with national ornaments in the yard of the Philharmonic Hall.

== Gallery ==
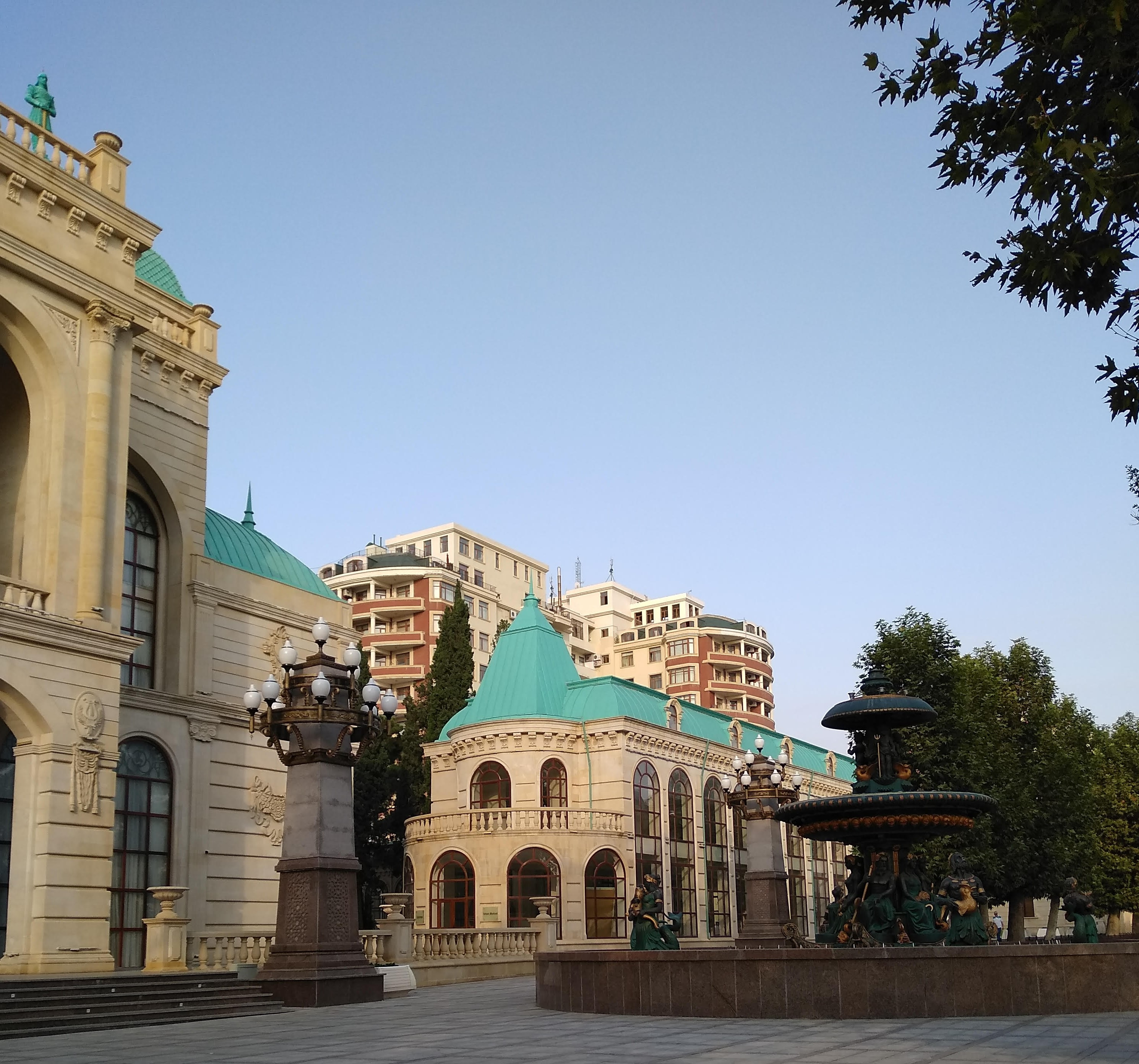
Gallery building of Ganja State Philharmonic Hall

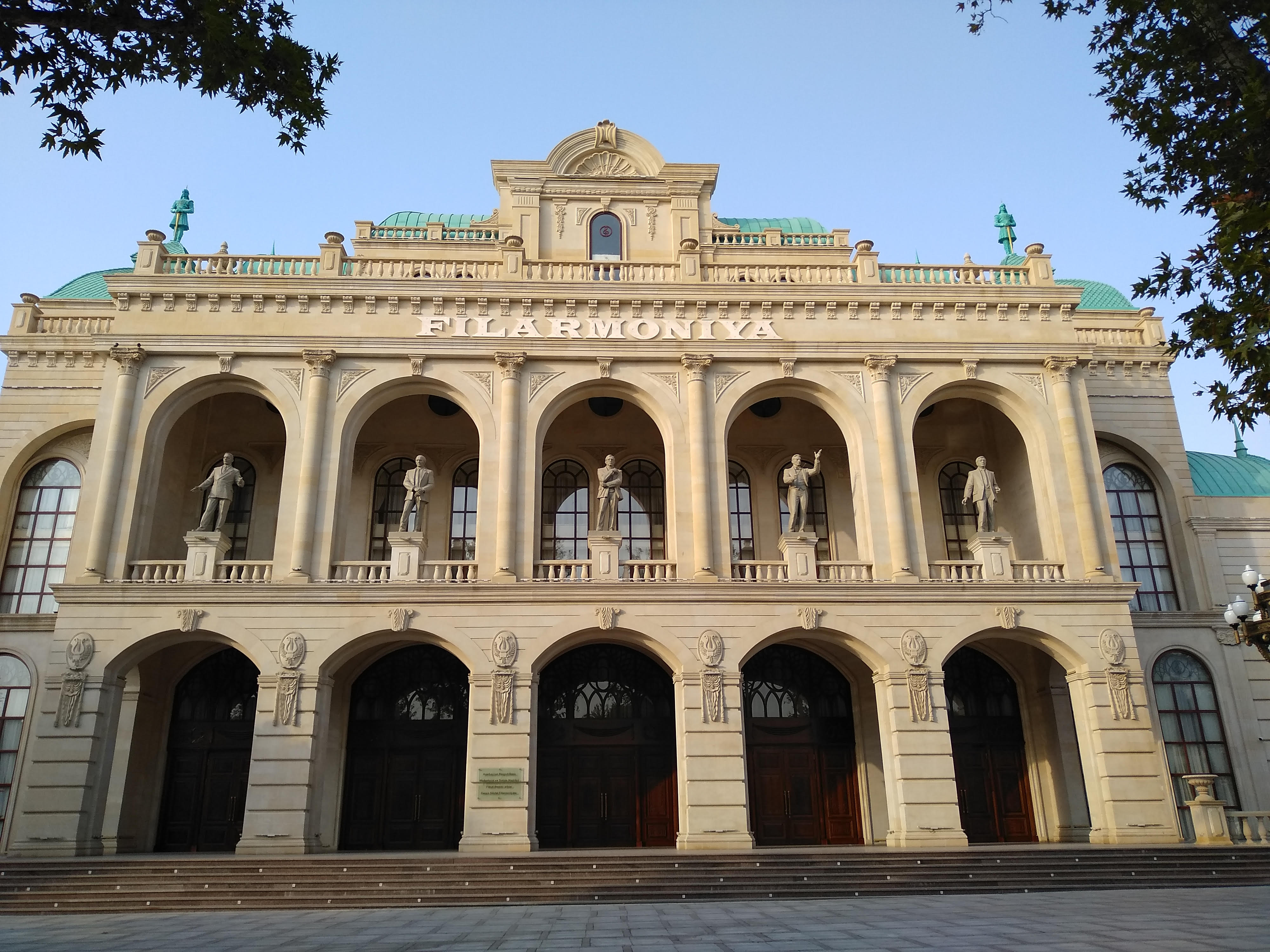
Statues on the balcony of Ganja State Philharmonic Hall

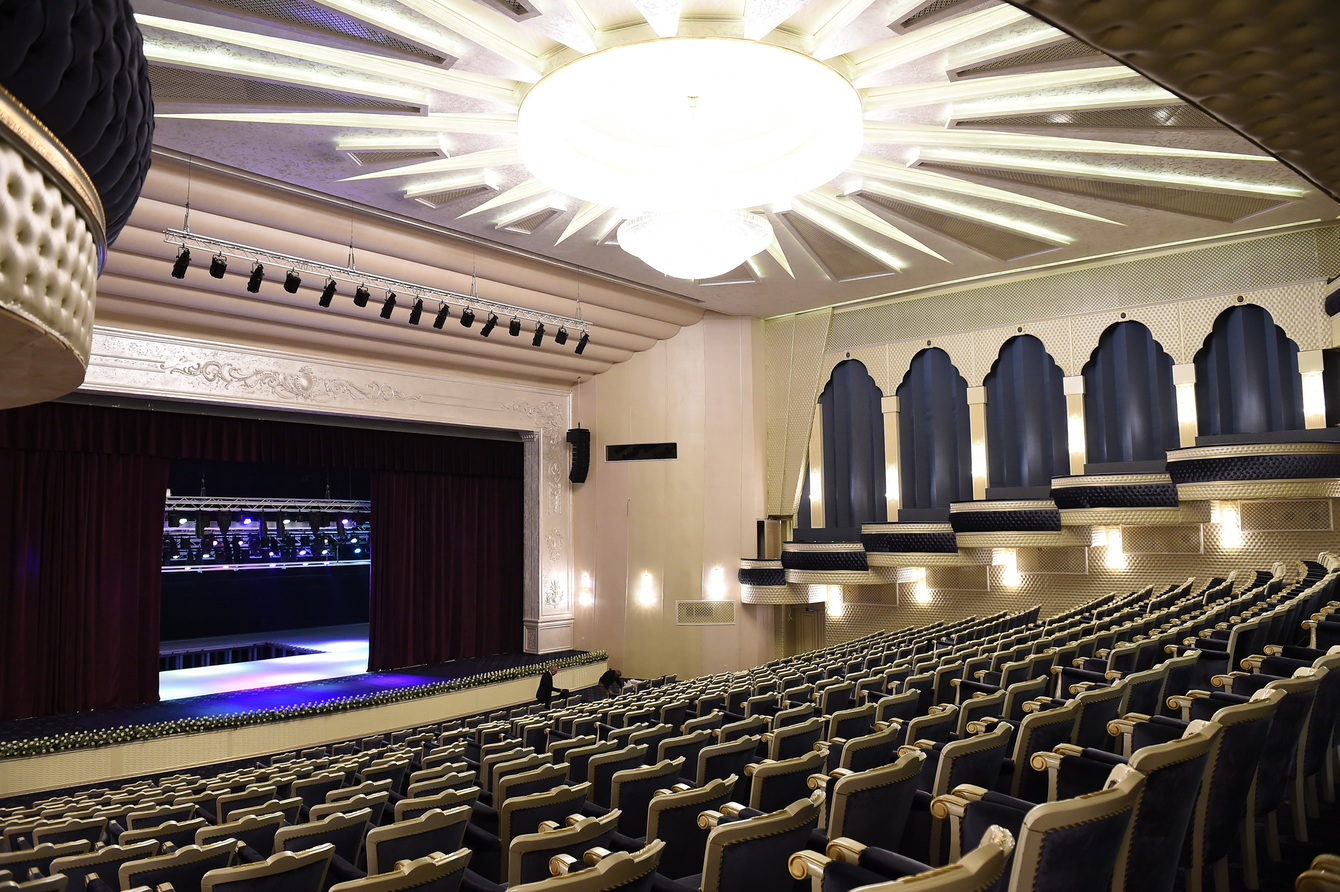
Main concert hall

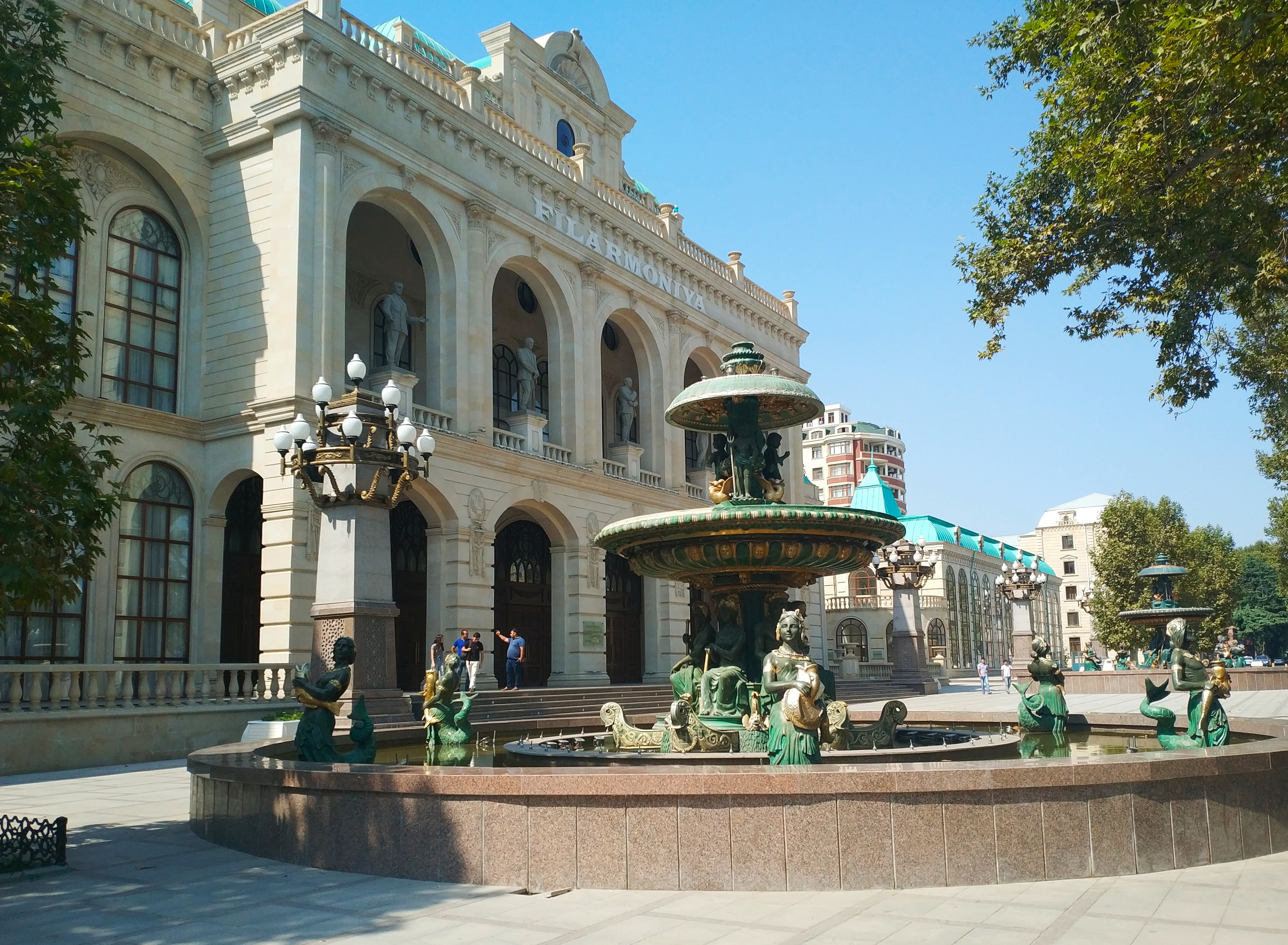
Fountain in front of the Ganja State Philharmonic Hall

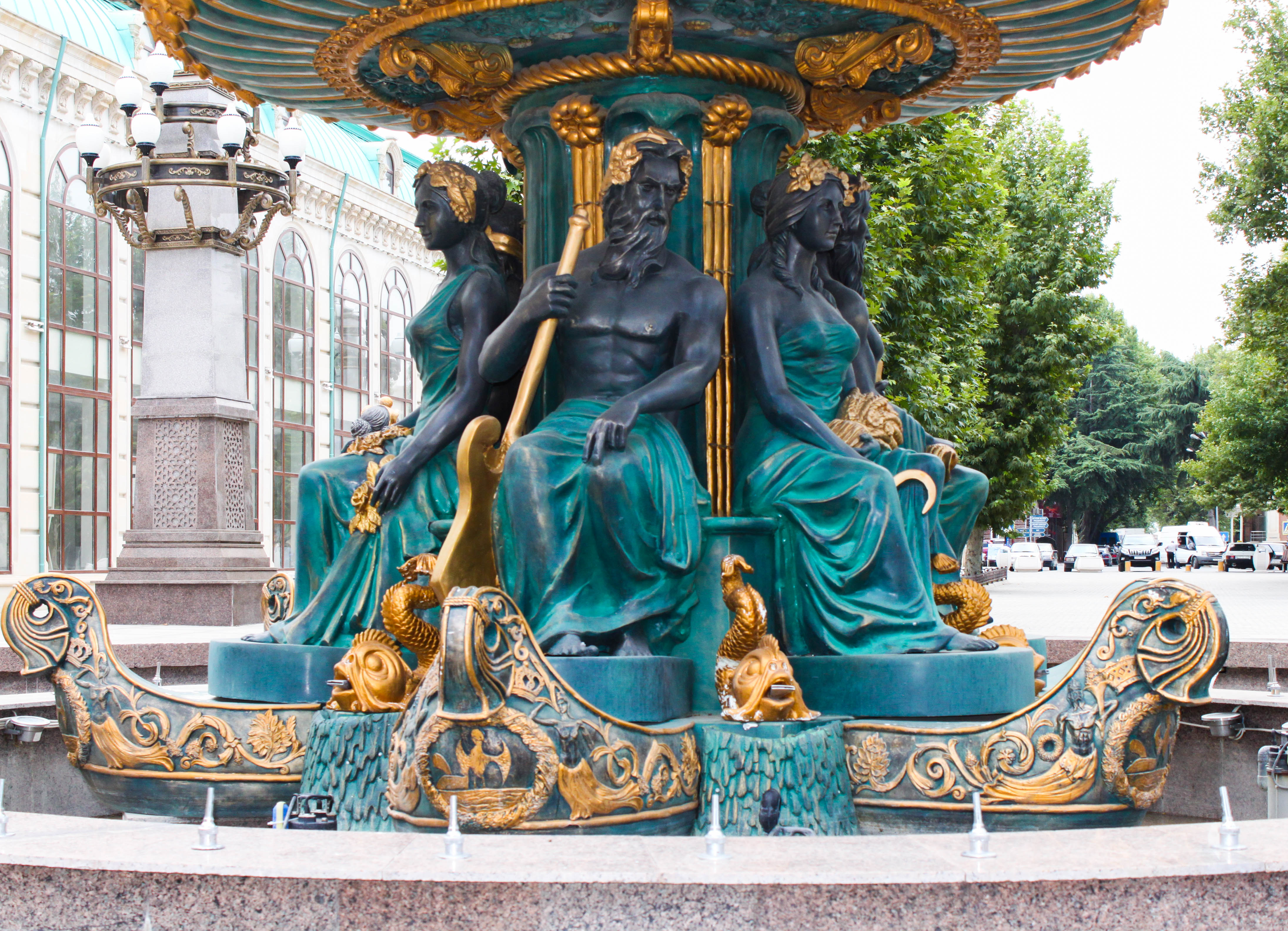

== See also ==
- Music of Azerbaijan
- Azerbaijan State Philharmonic Hall
- Fikret Amirov
