= Juma Mosque, Ganja =

Mosque in Ganja, Azerbaijan

Juma Mosque of Ganja
- Azerbaijani: Şah Abbas Məscidi; Persian: مسجد شاه‌عباس
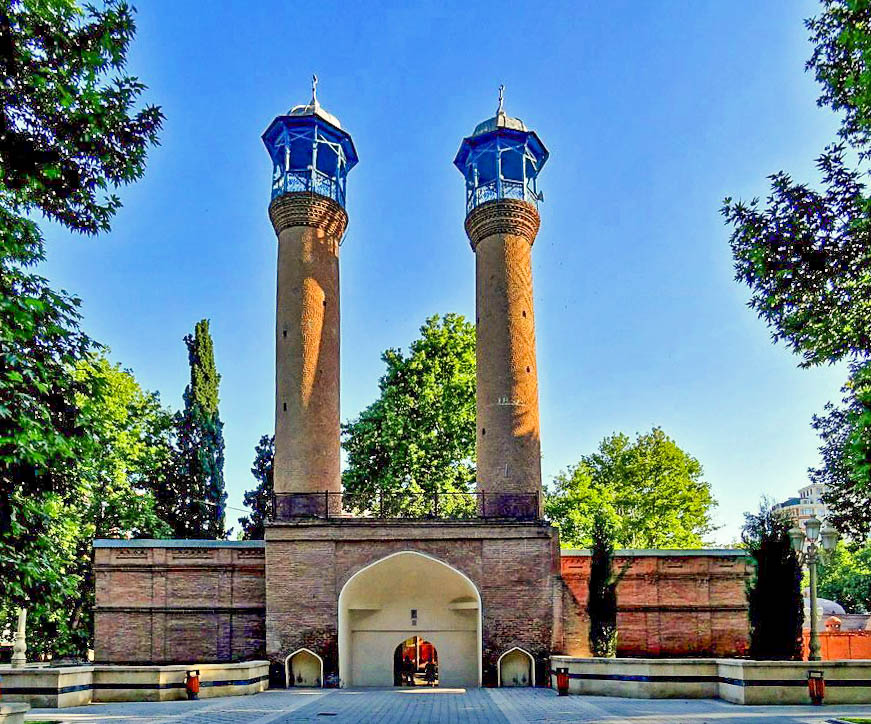
- The mosque in 2016

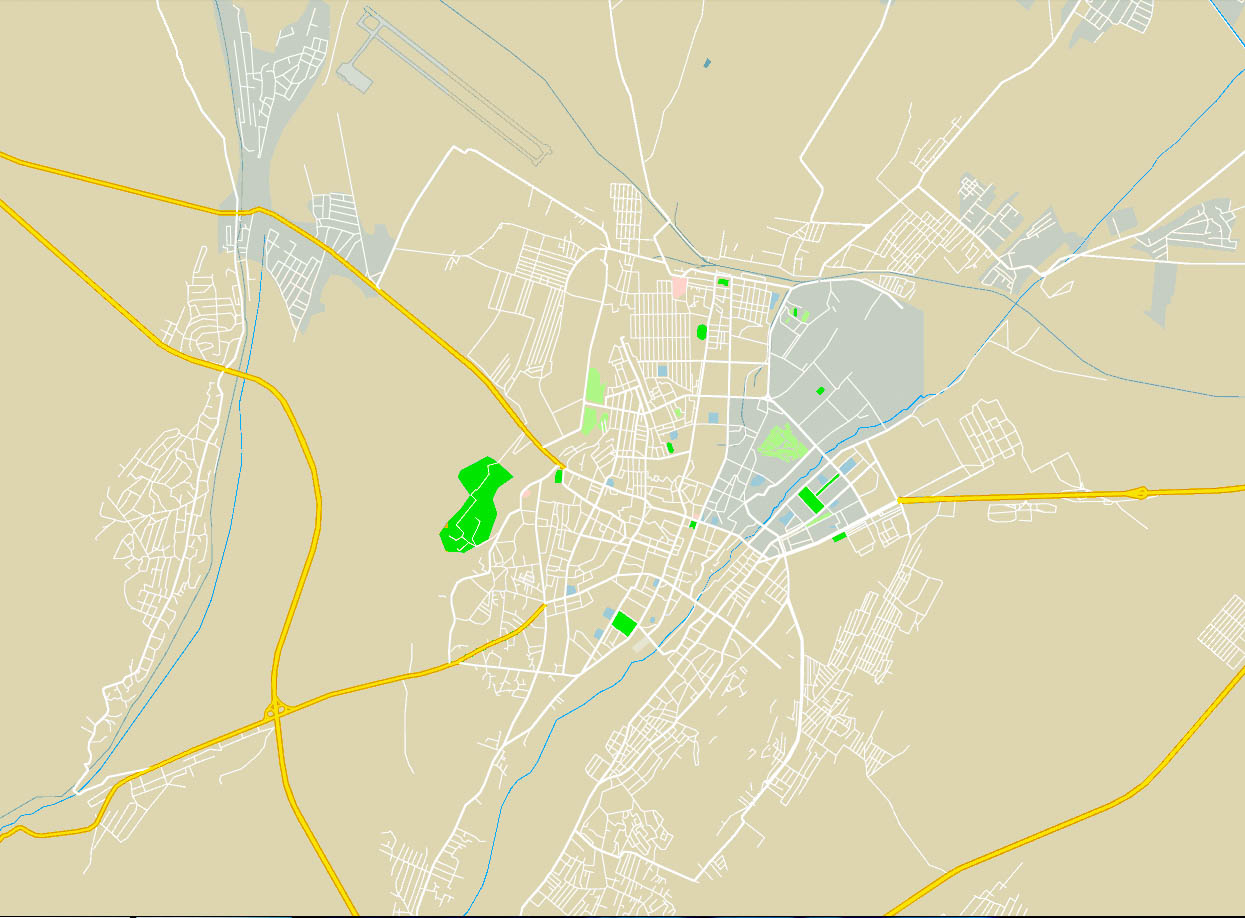
- Location of the mosque in Ganja

Religion
- Affiliation: Shia Islam
- Ecclesiastical or organisational status: Mosque
- Status: Active

Location
- Location: Ganja
- Country: Azerbaijan
- Coordinates: 40°40′39″N 46°21′32″E

Architecture
- Type: Mosque architecture
- Style: Iranian; Safavid; Arran architectural school
- Completed: 1606

Specifications
- Minaret: Two
- Materials: Red brick

The Juma Mosque of Ganja (Azerbaijani: Cümə məscidi, Persian: مسجد جمعه گنجه) or Friday Mosque of Ganja is a Shia Islam mosque, located in the centre of Ganja, Azerbaijan. The mosque was built in 1606, according to a project of Sheykh Baheddin Mohammad Amili. The mosque is also often called "Shah Abbas Mosque" (Azerbaijani: Şah Abbas Məscidi, Persian: مسجد شاه‌عباس) because it was built on the instructions of the Iranian Shah Abbas the Great during his reign.

== Overview ==
In 1776, two minarets were attached to the mosque. The mosque was built of red brick, which was traditional for Ganja. There was functioned a madrasa at the mosque for a long time, where the eminent Azerbaijani poet and scientist Mirza Shafi Vazeh taught at that time.

In 2008, the building of the mosque was totally reconstructed. Old Russian bonds put into an envelope had been found during the reconstruction. This finding helped to draw out a conclusion that the last construction works had been held in 1910, not at the end of the 18th century, during Javad Khan's reign, as it was considered earlier.

== See also ==
- Shia Islam in Azerbaijan
- List of mosques in Azerbaijan
