= Mahsati =

Persian Poet

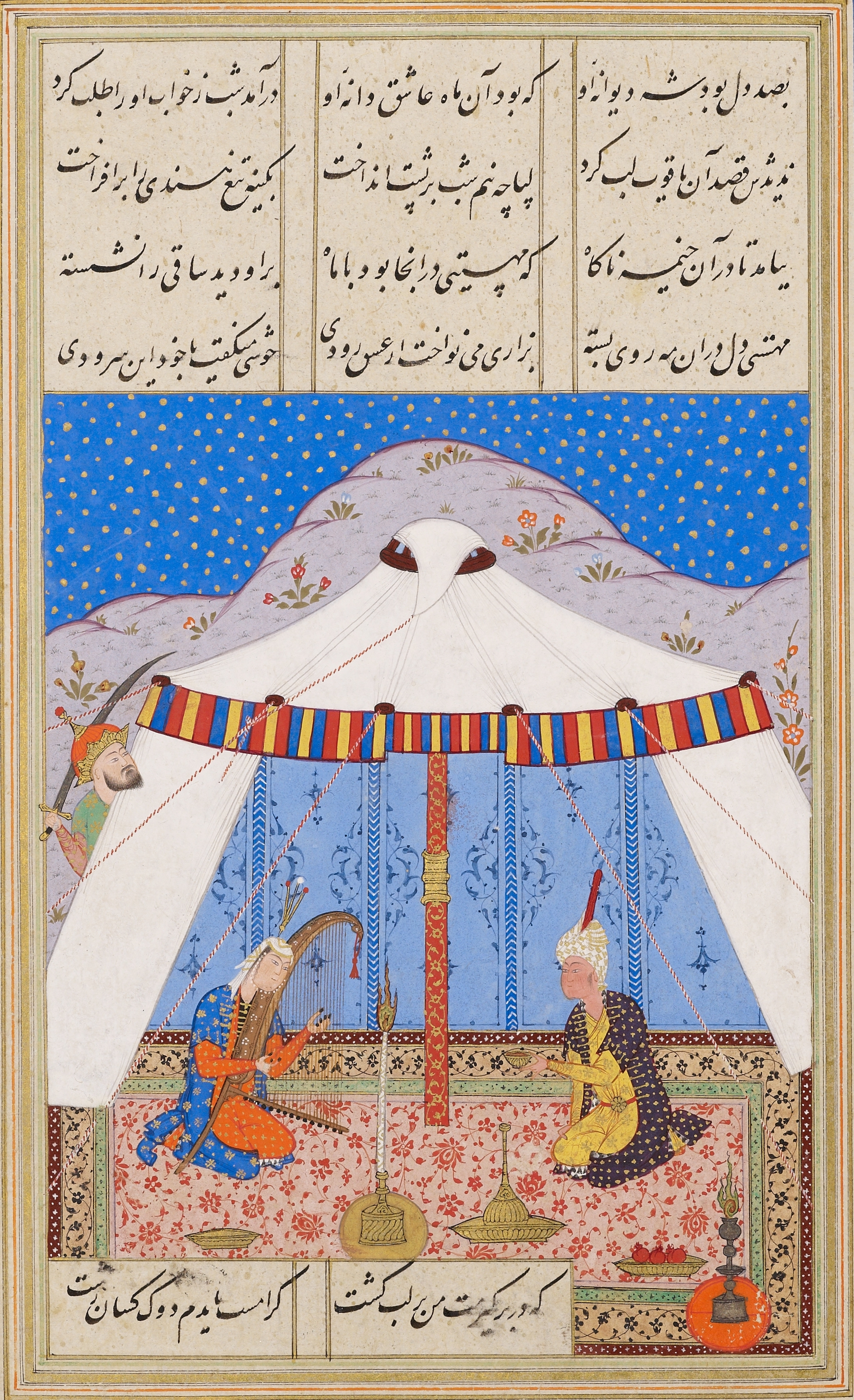
"Sultan Sanjar surprises his beloved entertaining Mahsati in his tent". Folio from the Majalis al-ushshaq, dated October/November 1552

Mahsati (Persian: مهستی, romanized: Mahsati) was a medieval Persian poet who was reportedly one of the first poets to compose ruba'iyat (quatrains) in her native language.

== Name ==
Various interpretations of her name have been suggested based on the consonants mhsty, such as Mahisti, Mahsiti or Mihisti. The most accurate interpretation is likely Mahsati, seemingly a combination of māh (moon) and the early Indian loanword satī (virtuous lady).

== Biography ==
The historicity of Mahsati is problematic to determine. The modern historian Francois de Blois considers her to be a semi-legendary figure, adding that "we have no information whatsoever about the historical person who (apparently) lurks behind the legend." She seemingly lived between the early 11th and the middle of the 12th century. She may have been born in Ganja, but later authors also consider to have been from Nishapur, Badakhshan or Khujand. She was reportedly one of the first composers of ruba'iyat (quatrains) in Persian.

Mahsati was quickly presented as the heroine of romantic tales, the earliest one being the Ilahi-nama of the Sufi poet Attar of Nishapur (died 1221). The tale narrates that Mahsati was a singer at the court of the Seljuk ruler Ahmad Sanjar (r. 1118–1157). An akin story is reported in the late 13th century by Abd Allah Jawhari in his commentary of qasida-yi hawliyya, a poem about alchemy. Nevertheless, it was not taken from Attar's Ilahi-nama. According to later authors such as Hamdallah Mustawfi (died after 1339/40), Mahsati served at the court of the Ghaznavid ruler Mahmud of Ghazni (r. 998–1030). The Iranologist Jan Rypka, however, considered it unlikely that she was already alive during the reign of Mahmud. He adds that Mahmud is evidently confused with Mahmud II, a governor of Sanjar.

The 15th-century biographical dictionary Tazkirat al-shu'ara of Dawlatshah Samarqandi (died 1495/1507) corroborates Mahsati's link with Sanjar. She and Jahan Malek Khatun are the only female poets mentioned in the book, both being briefly described. There Mahsati is listed amongst Sanjar's panegyric poets, in addition to other figures such as Adib Sabir, Rashid Vatvat, ‘Abd al-Vasih Jabali, and Anvari. Dawlatshah narrates that Mahsati gained the attention and favour of Sanjar by performing a speech which she had improvised. This took place during one evening, when Sanjar left his audience hall to mount his horse, but found the covered by unexpected snow. The speech was the following;

For thee hath Heaven saddled Fortune's steed, O King, and chosen thee from all who lead; Now o'er the Earth it spreads a silver sheet, To guard from mud thy gold-shod charger's feet

The term dabīr/dabīra (professional scribe) is often associated with her name, but it is uncertain if she ever held this function. Most sources present her as a singer and a musician, as well as a poet of a court.

== Work, legacy and assessment ==
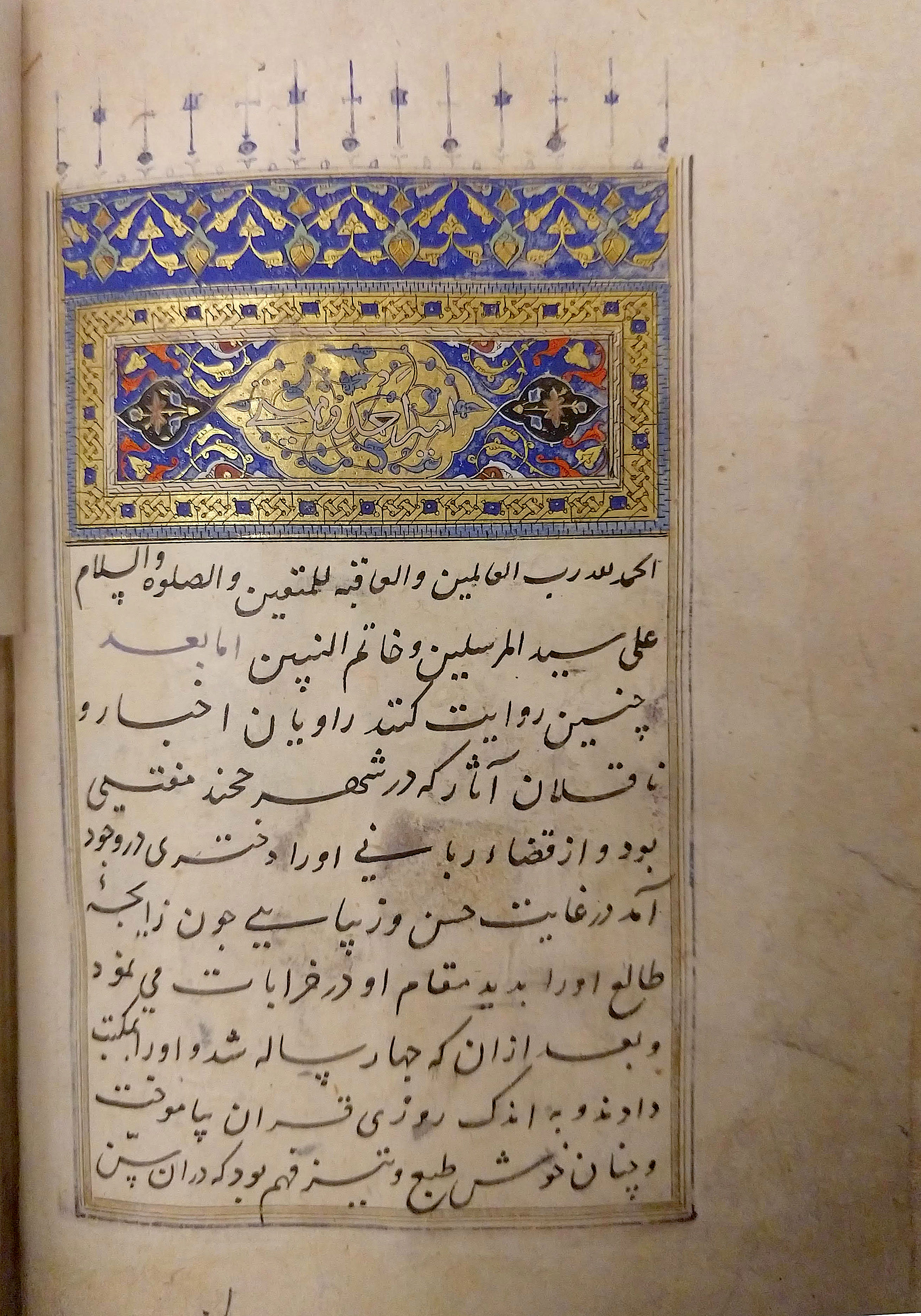
The opening of the anonymous romance of Mahsati and Amir Ahmad the preacher's son. Copy dated 1462

The vast majority of poems ascribed to her are ruba'iyat (quatrains), whose themes are generally about complaint of a lovers absence, a lovers lack of attention, or a lovers cruelty. Many of these poems are part of the shahrashub (erotic) genre, where the beloved is a young craftsman. Mahsati has become well-known for her bawdy verses. A copy of the Lughat-i Furs of Asadi Tusi (died 1073) stored in the Vatican Library attributes one verse to Mahsati, but other copies consider Rudaki (died 940/41) to have been its author. The Iranologist Edward Granville Browne considered her to some extent have lesbian inclinations.

Mahsati notably appears in the tazkera (collection of biographies) Riaz al-sho'ara, composed by Valeh Daghestani (died 1756) in c. 1747 in Delhi. By this period, Mahsati was acknowledged as the first and most prominent female poet of the Persian language. Valeh was seemingly contemplative of her poems, and saw her not just as a woman, but as an important poet. He recounts the tale of Mahsati, who "was a prostitute and the beloved of Sultan Sanjar." The latter admired her physical attractiveness, but was even more enthusiastic about her poetic ability, as demonstrated in the following excerpt from Valeh;

One of her quatrains is equal to a thousand divans. Her quatrain had become my mantra for six months, to the extent that I even recited it in my sleep and any person who was sleeping near me would hear it and be woken up. Truly this quatrain is one of those poems the like of which a poet such as Khaqani could perhaps compose once in a lifetime, and the sincerity of these words will be clear to any poet worth his salt:

I considered your pact with me to be very weak and thought fit to break it. All the cruelties you inflicted on me, you did them, after all—[I wish] I had known early.

== See also ==
- List of Iranian women writers and poets

== Sources ==
- de Blois, Francois (2004). Persian Literature - A Bio-Bibliographical Survey: Poetry of the Pre-Mongol Period (Volume V). Routledge. ISBN 978-0947593476.
- Browne, Edward Granville (2013). A Literary History of Persia: 4 Volume Set. Routledge. ISBN 978-0700704064.
- de Bruijn, J.T.P. (1991). "Mahsatī". In Bosworth, C. E.; van Donzel, E. & Pellat, Ch. (eds.). The Encyclopaedia of Islam, Second Edition. Volume VI: Mahk–Mid. Leiden: E. J. Brill. pp. 85–86. ISBN 978-90-04-08112-3.
- Dabashi, Hamid (2012). The World of Persian Literary Humanism. Harvard University Press. ISBN 978-0-674-06759-2.
- Rypka, Jan (1968). History of Iranian Literature. Springer Netherlands. ISBN 978-9401034814.
- Sharma, Sunil (2009). "From ʿĀʾesha to Nur Jahān: The Shaping of a Classical Persian Poetic Canon of Women". Journal of Persianate Studies (2). Brill: 148–164. Archived from the original on 2022-08-03.
- Sharma, Sunil (2021). "The Courtesan and the Preacher: The Romance of Mahsati, an Early Female Persian Poet". The British Library.
