= Behboud Shahtahtinsky =

Azerbaijani statesman from Nakhchivan

Behboud Shahtahtinsky Behbud ağa Şahtaxtinski
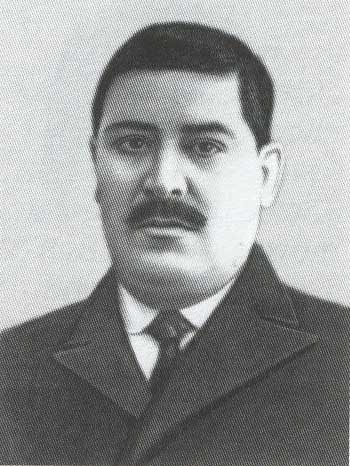

People's Commissar of the Workers' and Peasants' Inspectorate of the Azerbaijan SSR

Personal details
- Born: March 12, 1881 Shakhtakhty, Nakhchivan, Erivan Governorate, Russian Empire
- Died: May 30, 1924 (aged 43) Tiflis, USSR

Behboud Shahtahtinsky (Azerbaijani: Behbud ağa Şahtaxtinski) (1881, in Şahtaxtı, Nakhichevan uezd, Erivan Governorate, Russian Empire – 30 May 1924 in Tiflis, USSR) was an Azerbaijani statesman and politician, diplomat; Extraordinary and Plenipotentiary Representative of the Azerbaijan SSR in the RSFSR, People's Commissar of Justice and the Workers' and Peasants' Inspectorate of the Azerbaijan SSR.

== Life ==
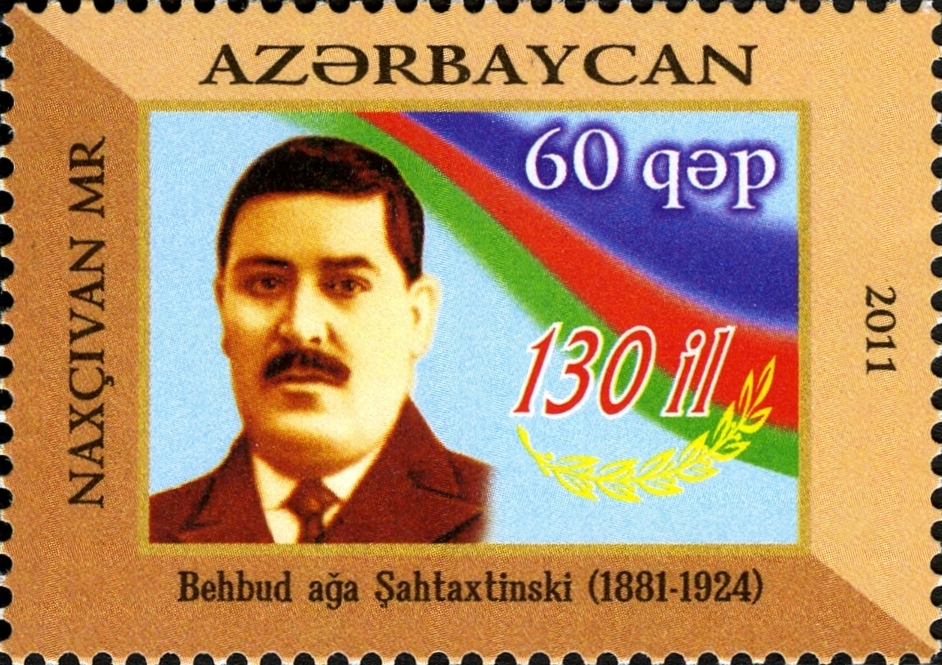
Stamps of Azerbaijan, 2011

Behbud Shakhtakhtinsky was born in 1881 in the village of Shakhtakhty, Erivan Governorate. In 1905–1907, he participated in the creation and activities of the organization of office workers in the city of Baku. In 1917-1918 he was a member of the executive committee of the Baku Council, the Extraordinary Commission of the Council of People's Commissars of Baku, chairman of the central committee of the Muslim Social Democratic Party. In 1920, after the establishment of Soviet power in Azerbaijan, he was appointed People's Commissar of Justice of the Azerbaijan SSR and at the same time the plenipotentiary representative of the Azerbaijan SSR in the RSFSR, participated in the signing of the Kars Treaty. In 1921-1922 he was chairman of the Nakhichevan Revolutionary Committee, chairman of the Council of People's Commissars of the Nakhichevan ASSR. Behbud Shakhtakhtinsky died in 1924 in Tiflis. He was buried in the Pantheon of prominent Azerbaijanis, located on the territory of the Tbilisi Botanical Garden.
