= Ingeborg Bronsart von Schellendorf =

Swedish-German composer

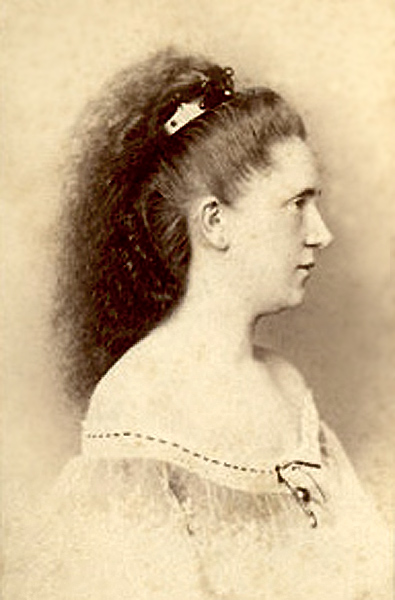
- Ingeborg Bronsart
- Born: Ingeborg Maria Wilhelmina Starck; 24 August 1840; Saint Petersburg, Russia
- Died: 17 June 1913 (aged 72); Munich, Bavaria, Germany
- Occupation: Composer

Ingeborg Bronsart von Schellendorf (born Ingeborg Maria Wilhelmina Starck, 24 August 1840 – 17 June 1913) was a Finland-Swedish and German composer.

== Life ==
Ingeborg Starck was born in Saint Petersburg, the daughter of Finland-Swedish parents Margareta Åkerman and Otto Starck (originally Tarkiain[en]) who were living in Saint Petersburg, Russia, where her father, a court saddle-maker, was involved in commerce. Her native language was Swedish. Having shown musical gifts from a young age, she studied piano with Nicolas von Martinoff and Adolf Henselt, as well as composition with Konstantin Decker. She completed her studies in Weimar with Franz Liszt. During a stay in Paris in 1861 her friends included composers such as Auber, Berlioz, Rossini and Wagner. In September of the same year, she married fellow pianist-composer Hans Bronsart von Schellendorff, a member of Liszt's circle whom she had met in Weimar.

Ingeborg Bronsart von Schellendorf toured Europe as a concert pianist until 1867, when her husband accepted a court appointment at the Royal Theatre in Hanover; state policy prohibited the wives of Prussian officials from appearing publicly as artists. She remained musically active as a composer of vocal music, notably four operas and approximately eighty art songs, chamber and instrumental music. Her songs set texts by poets of the golden age of German Romanticism, including Goethe, Rückert, and Heine, as well as by several of her contemporaries, among them Friedrich von Bodenstedt, Peter Cornelius, and Ernst von Wildenbruch. Earlier, she had composed a piano concerto (1863), now lost. During her lifetime her operas were successfully produced in many theatres in Germany. Pieces composed by her which were popular at the time included her Kaiser Wilhelm March (1871), the Singspiel Jery und Bätely (1873) and the opera Hiarne (1891). Marie Lipsius, her friend and biographer, described her as "the first and until now the only German woman dramatic composer," and also noted that she was also "the first woman to have brought a large opera {Hiarne) to the stage. Despite Hiarne's success, it was never published. Her first opera, Die Göttin von Sais was lost, despite its surviving libretto. Other works experienced success: her sole large orchestral work, Kaiser-Wilhelm March composed in 1871, was written to celebrate the triumphant return of German troops to Berlin following the Franco-Prussian War. The work was later performed at the opening of the Women’s Section of the World’s Fair in Chicago in 1893. She died in Munich.

== Works ==
=== Operas ===
- Die Göttin von Sais (1867)
- Jery und Bätely (1873)
- König Hiarne (1891)
- Die Sühne (1909)

=== Concertos ===
- Concerto for Piano and Orchestra in F-minor (1863)

=== Orchestral works ===
- Kaiser Wilhelm March (1872)

=== Chamber music ===
- Romanze in A minor for violin and piano (1873)
- Notturno in A minor for cello and piano, op. 13 (1879)
- Elegie in C major for cello and piano, op. 14 (1879)
- Romanze in B-flat major for cello and piano, op. 15 (1879)
- Phantasie for violin and piano, op. 21 (1891)

=== Piano music ===
- Trois études (1855)
- Nocturne (1855)
- Tarantella (1855)
- Fuge über die Namen Maria und Martha (von Sabinin) (1859)
- Fugues (1859)
- Variations on themes by Bach (1859)
- Variations (1859)
- Toccatas (1859)
- Sonata (1859)
- Kaiser Wilhelm March (1871)
- Vier Clavierstücke (1874)
- Drei Phantasie in G-sharp minor, op. 18 (1891)

=== Choral music ===
- Hurrah Germania! for male choir (1871)
- Kennst du die rothe Rose? for soloists male choir and mixed choir (1873)
- Easter Lied, for choir, op. 27 (1903)

=== Songs ===
- Die Loreley (1865)

(Text: Heinrich Heine)

- Und ob der holde Tag vergangen (1870)
- Three Lieder (1871)

(Text: A. Dunker, E. Neubauer, H. Zeise)

- Three Lieder (1872)

(Text: Heine, O. Roquette)
... 3. Ich hab' im Traum geweinet

- Five Lieder (1878)

(Text: Johann Wolfgang von Goethe, August von Platen, Friedrich Rückert)

- Six Lieder by Mirza Schaffy, op. 8 (1879)

(Text: Friedrich Martin von Bodenstedt after Mirza Shafi Vazeh)
1. Zuléikha; 2. Im Garten klagt die Nachtigall; 3. Wenn der Frühling auf die Berge steigt; 4. Gelb rollt mir zu Füßen; 5. Die helle Sonne leuchtet; 6. Ich fühle deinen Odem

- Hafisa: Three Lieder by Mirza Schaffy, op. 9 (1879)

(Text: Bodenstedt after Mirza Shafi)

- 6 Poems, op. 10 (1879)

(Text: Bodenstedt)
1. Mir träumte einst ein schöner Traum; 2. Abschied vom Kaukasus; 3. Wie lächeln die Augen; 4. Nachtigall, o Nachtigall; 5. Das Vöglein; 6. Sing, mit Sonnenaufgang singe

- Five Christmas Lieder, op. 11 (1880)

(Text: Jakobi)

- Five Poems, op. 12 (1880)

(Text: Bodenstedt)

- Röslein auf Haiden (1880–1885)

(Text: Richard Voss)

- Five Poems, op. 16 (1882)

(Text: Ernst von Wildenbruch)
1. Abendlied; 2. Ständchen; 3. Zwei Sträusse; 4. Der Blumenstrauss 5. Letzte Bitte

- Twelve Nursery Rhymes, op. 17 (1882)

(Text: Klaus Groth)

- Wie dich die warme Luft umscherzt“ (?)
- Blumengruss (1888)

(Text: Goethe)

- Six Poems, op. 20 (1891)

(Text: Michail Lermontov)

- Three Poems, op. 22 (1891)

(Text: Peter Cornelius)

- Three Lieder, op. 23 (1892)

(Text: Goethe, Nikolaus Lenau, Platen)

- Im Lenz (1898)

(Text: Paul Heyse)

- Rappelle-toi! op. 24 (1902)

(Text: Alfred de Musset)

- Three Lieder, op. 25 (1902)

(Text: Bodenstedt, Goethe, Heine)
... 3. Ich stand in dunkeln Träumen (Heine)

- Abschied, op. 26 (1902)

(Text: Felix Dahn)

- Lieder, (c. 1903)

(Text: Bodenstedt)

- Verwandlung (1910)

(Text: Paul Heyse)

- Lieder (1910)

== Discography ==
Jery und Bätely (2024) — Malmö Opera Orchestra, conducted by Tobias Ringborg; with Karin Bruker (Jery), Anett Fritsch van der Plas (Bätely), Kalaidjian, S. T. Freier, and Edén. Naxos.

== Sources ==
- This article is based on the Swedish Wikipedia entry
- The list of songs is drawn from the Lied and Art Song Texts Page and a list of works by MUGi – Musik und Gender im Internet
