= Utecht (surname) =

Utecht is a surname. Notable people with the surname include:

- Ben Utecht (born 1981), American football player
- Michael Utecht (born 1952 or 1953), German author
