= Elsa d'Esterre-Keeling =

Irish novelist, translator and teacher

Elizabeth Henrietta Keeling
- Born: 16 November 1857
- Died: 13 January 1935 (aged 77)
- Writing career
- Pen name: Elsa d'Esterre-Keeling
- Genres: novels and short stories
- Notable works: Three Sisters: or, Sketches of a Highly Original Family

Elsa d'Esterre-Keeling (born Elizabeth Henrietta Keeling; 16 November 1857 – 13 January 1935) was an Irish-born novelist, translator and teacher.

== Early life ==
She was born in Dublin to John Keeling and Adelaide Eleonore Hughes. Her father was sentenced to prison when she was quite young and remained absent from her family. She, along with her mother and three sisters, moved to the German Empire in 1874. In Germany she continued her education and did translation work for the British Legation in Stuttgart and the British Consulate General in Frankfurt.

== Career ==
Keeling moved to Britain in the 1880s, where she became a school teacher and eventually opened her own school, Danvers College. At this time she also began her career as a writer and adopted the pen-name Elsa D'Esterre-Keeling, producing a series of novels and short stories that were published in London during the 1880s and 1890s. She also translated works from German, such as Friedrich von Bodenstedt's translation of the Persian poetry of Mirza Shafi Vazeh.

== Later life and death ==
By 1900 Keeling had finished creative writing, in order to focus on teaching. She never married, but adopted twelve children, and died in Wimbledon on 13 January 1935.

== Select bibliography ==
- Three Sisters: or, Sketches of a Highly Original Family. 2 vol. London: Sampson Low, 1884.
- The Professor's Wooing: Being the Courtship of Monsieur La Mie. 2 vol. London: Sampson Low, 1886.
- In Thoughtland and in Dreamland. 1 vol. London: T. Fisher Unwin, 1890.
- Orchardscroft: The Story of an Artist. 1 vol. London: T. Fisher Unwin, 1892.
- Appassionata: A Musician's Story. 1 vol. London: William Heinemann, 1893.
- Old Maids and Young. 1 vol. London: Cassell, 1895.
- A Return to Nature: A Kentish Idyll. 1 vol. London: Jarrold and Son, 1897.
- The Queen's Serf: Being the Adventures of Ambrose Gwinnett in England and Spanish America. 1 vol. London: T. Fisher Unwin, 1898.
