= Hans Bronsart von Schellendorff =

Classical musician and composer

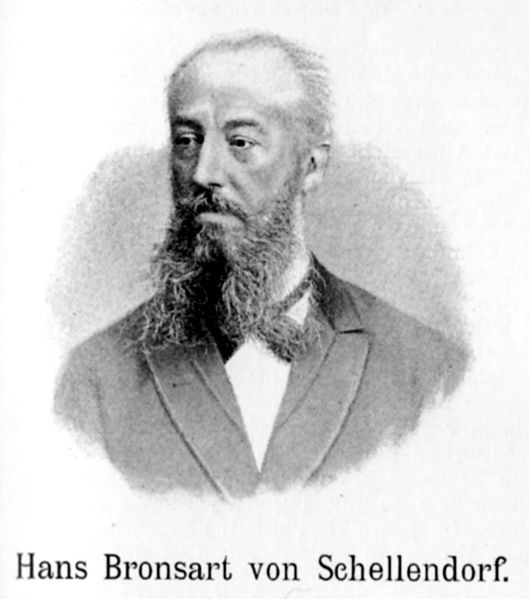
- Portrait of Bronsart von Schellendorf from a book of 1893
- Born: 11 February 1830
- Died: 3 November 1913 (aged 83)
- Occupations: Classical musician and composer

Hans Bronsart von Schellendorf (11 February 1830 – 3 November 1913) was a classical musician and composer who studied under Franz Liszt.

== Biography ==
Hans Bronsart von Schellendorf (also called Hans von Bronsart) was born into a Prussian military family, to the lieutenant general Heinrich Bronsart von Schellendorff. He was educated at Berlin University and studied piano with Adolph Jullack. He went to Weimar in 1853 where he met Franz Liszt and became familiar with all the musicians in Liszt's circle at the time, including Hector Berlioz and Johannes Brahms. It is a measure of his close relationship with Liszt that it was he who played the solo part in the first Weimar performance of Liszt's 2nd Piano Concerto, with the composer conducting. When the concerto was published, Liszt dedicated it to Bronsart. After having trained for several years with Liszt, he worked as a conductor in Leipzig and Berlin, and then took the post of general manager of the Royal Theatre in Hanover from 1867 to 1887. He held a similar post in Weimar from 1887 until his retirement in 1895.

He met his second wife Ingeborg Bronsart von Schellendorf (née Ingeborg Lena Starck) (1840–1913), also a composer, in Weimar. They married in 1861.

Bronsart von Schellendorff died in Munich in 1913.

== Compositions ==
Bronsart von Schellendorf's compositions include

- Piano Trio in G minor, Op. 1
- Piano Concerto in F-sharp minor, Op. 10
- Symphony No. 1 In die Alpen for choir and orchestra (lost)
- Symphony No. 2 Schicksalsgewalten (lost)
- Fruhlings-Fantasie for orchestra
- Christnacht, cantata
- Der Corsar, opera
- String Sextet
- solo piano pieces.

His piano concerto was much favoured by Hans von Bülow, who rated the work as the "most significant one of the so-called Weimar school". It was recorded in 1973 by Michael Ponti, in 2017 by Emmanuel Despax for Hyperion Records, and in 2022 by Paul Wee for BIS Records.

Both Bronsart and his wife receive many mentions in Liszt's letters. Liszt clearly held their compositions in high regard. In a letter from 12 May 1879, to Walter Bache, he writes "On 5th June Bülow conducts the first concert there, at which Bronsart's beautiful and valuable Fruhlings-Fantasie, Bülow's music to Shakespeare's Julius Caesar, and my Faust Symphony will be performed."
