= Michael Utecht =

German author (born 1952)

Michael Utecht (born 1952 or 1953) is a German author and former head of the Peine city archive.

== Life ==
Michael Utecht was educated as an art teacher. In 1988, as part of a job creation measure (ABM), he got a job in the city archive of Peine, which was then still stored in the basement of the city hall and was only managed on a voluntary basis. Utecht's first task associated with the measure was to make an inventory of the estate of Peine's bailiff Johann Friedrich Ziegler.

After the start of the job creation measure and the move to the current building, the Peine City Archive was to be staffed full-time in the future. After Utecht had initially managed the archive on an interim basis, a year later he successfully applied for the post of archive director, where he ended up managing the institution for around 30 years.

For a reassessment of the events of the November pogroms of 1938 in Peine by the historian Jens Binner in the Peine District Museum, Utecht contributed archival materials such as trial files and photos, for exampl a photo of the burning Peine synagogue, in 2017.

In his office he planned and wrote numerous publications, including the series “History(s) from the City Archives” published in the newspaper Peiner Allgemeine Zeitung.

In 2019, Utecht retired. In the same year, as the sixth volume of the source editions from the city archives, he published previously unknown letters from Friedrich von Bodenstedt, an honorary citizen of Peine, on his 200th birthday.

Most of his writings were self-published by the city archive Peine.

== Writings ==
=== Monographies ===
- Friedrich von Bodenstedt: „… daß ich Dir schon wieder schreibe.“ Briefe an seine Frau und seine Kinder. Quelleneditionen aus dem Stadtarchiv, Band 6, 2019. (German)
- Michael Utecht (Red.), Andreas Kulhawy (Bearb., Einl.): Peine im Ersten Weltkrieg. Aus den Feldpostbriefen der Familien Ziegler und Heine (= Quelleneditionen aus dem Stadtarchiv, Bd. 5), Peine, 2014 (German); table of content (German)

=== Essays ===
- Die Stadt Peine: Geografische Lage, Name und Geschichte der Stadt Peine. In: Brage Bei der Wieden, Henning Steinführer (Hrsg.): Amt und Verantwortung: Träger kommunaler Selbstverwaltung im Wirkungskreis der Braunschweigischen Landschaft. Im Auftrag der Braunschweigischen Landschaft e.V., Appelhans, Braunschweig 2015, ISBN 978-3-944939-10-0, S. 213–323. (German)
- Die Jüdische Gemeinde im Spiegel städtischer Quellen des 17.–19. Jahrhunderts. In: Jens Binner (Hrsg.): Die jüdische Gemeinde in Peine vom Mittelalter bis 1942. Kreisheimatbund Peine, Peine 2009, ISBN 3-9805245-6-6, S. 57–72. (German)
- „Auf der Flucht erschossen!“ Anmerkungen zur Quellensituation Quellen im Startarchiv Peine, in: Jens Binner: „... und trug das Zeichen OST“: Zwangsarbeit in Stadt und Landkreis Peine, Kreisheimatbund Peine, Peine 2002, ISBN 978-3-9805245-2-0, S. 61–74 (German)
- Dietrich Wilde. Jurist in Halle und Magdeburg. Geb. 26.3.1909 Bad Suderode; gest. 29.3.1984 Peine, in: Braunschweigisches Biographisches Lexikon, Bd. 2: 19. und 20. Jahrhundert, 1996, S. 655–656 (German)
- in Niedersachsenbuch:
  - 777 Jahre Stadt Peine. Rückblick in die Geschichte, 2000, S. 9–21 (German)
  - Die Peiner Eule. Vom Spottnamen zum Wahrzeichen, 2000, S. 150–158 (German)

=== Archive special sheets ===
- Friedrich von Bodenstedt. Dichter, Schriftsteller und Peiner Ehrenbürger ( = Archiv Sonderblatt, 2/1999), Peine 1999; PDF, leaflet with 6 pages (German)
- Instandsetzung der Ratsmühle 1695 ( = Archiv Sonderblatt, 2/1999), Peine 1999; PDF-Dokument, leaflet with 6 pages (German)
- Am Windmühlenwall: Frisch gepflanzte Weiden “aufgezogen und ruiniret” ( = Archiv Sonderblatt, 3/1999), Peine 1999; PDF, leaflet with 6 pages (German)
- Friedrich-Ebert-Platz. Urbahrmachung einer öhden Sandgrube am Pferdemarkt – der Friedrich-Ebert-Platz im 18. Jahrhundert ( = Archiv Sonderblatt, Ausgabe 4/1999), Peine 1999; PDF, leaftlet with 6 pages (German)
- Der Peiner Stadt-Schafmeister Blickwede machte sich „mit nächtlicher Fortschaffung der Seinigen“ aus dem Staub ( = Archiv Sonderblatt, 1/2000), Peine 2000; PDF, leaflet with 6 pages (German)
- Ein tödlicher Schuss. 1790. Einbruch beim Stadtchirurgen 1814, ( = Archiv Sonderblatt, 2/2000), Peine 2000; PDF, leaflet with 6 pages (German)
- Friedrich von Bodenstedt (1819 - 1892). Reiseabenteuer in Russland ( = Archiv Sonderblatt, 1/2001), Peine 2001; PDF, leaflet with 6 pages (German)
- Währungsreform 1948. Währungsrefom und Schwarzmarkt 1948 ( = Archiv Sonderblatt, 1/2002), Peine 2002; PDF, leaflet with 6 pages (German)
- Peiner Freischießen im 19. Jahrhundert Bürger-Tambouren, Trommelboes und Poratzikow ( = Archiv Sonderblatt, 2/2002), Peine 2002; PDF, leaflet with 6 pages (German)
- Friedrich von Bodenstedt in England ( = Archiv Sonderblatt, 2/2002), Peine 2002; PDF, leaflet with 6 pages (German)
- Bahnstation Peine 1851 ( = Archiv Sonderblatt, 3/2002), Peine 2002; PDF, leaflet with 6 pages (German)
- Die Peiner Eule. Vom Spottnamen zum Wahrzeichen, Hrsg.: Stadt Peine, Amt für Öffentlichkeitsarbeit und Repräsentation, [o.D., 2002]; PDF, 17 pages (German)
- Winterkrise 1946/47 ( = Archiv Sonderblatt, 1/2003), Peine 2003; PDF, leaflet with 6 pages (German)
- Die Jüdische Gemeinde. Vom Mittelalter bis 1942. Geduldet - Geachtet - Vernichtet ( = Archiv Sonderblatt, 2/2003), Peine 2003; PDF, leaflet with 6 pages (German)
- Eröffnung der Bahnstrecke Hannover - Braunschweig 1844 ( = Archiv Sonderblatt, 1/2004), Peine 2004; PDF, leaflet with 6 pages (German)
- Peine im August 1914 ( = Archiv Sonderblatt, 2/2004), Peine 2004; PDF-Dokument, leaflet with 6 pages (German)
- Gründung des Bibliotheks-Vereins 1829 ( = Archiv Sonderblatt, 3/2004), Peine 2004; PDF-Dokument, leaflet with 6 pages (German)
- Stadt Peine. Die Geschichte des Burgparks. Die Geschichte der Peiner Burg und des Amtmann-Ziegler-Gartens, Hrsg.: Peine Marketing GmbH in Zusammenarbeit mit dem Stadtarchiv Peine, Peine 2004; als PDF, leaflet with 6 pages (German)
- Stadtverwaltung und Besatzungsmacht 1945 ( = Archiv Sonderblatt, 1/2005), Peine 2005; wAssets/docs/mediadaten_stadt/eigene_daten/Stadtarchiv/2005-1-Sommer1945.pdf PDF, leaflet with 6 pages (German)
- Straßenschmutz und Müllprobleme im 19. Jahrhundert ( = Archiv Sonderblatt, 2/2005), Peine 2005; PDF, leaflet with 6 pages (German)
- Streit um die Rathausbeheizung 1830 ( = Archiv Sonderblatt, 3/2005), Peine 2005; PDF, leaflet with 6 pages (German)
- Friedrich von Bodenstedt: „Die Stellung der Frauen im Orient und Occident“ ( = Archiv Sonderblatt, 1/2006), Peine 2006; PDF, leaflet with 6 pages (German)
- Kleine Stadtchronik ( = Archiv Sonderblatt, 2/2006), Peine 2006; PDF, leaflet with 6 pages (German)
- Der Nothstand der Stadt Peine im Jahre 1846/47 ( = Archiv Sonderblatt 3/2006), Peine 2006; PDF, leaflet with 6 pages (German)
- Friedrich von Bodenstedt in Wien 1848 ( = Archiv Sonderblatt, 1/2007), Peine 2007; PDF, leaflet with 6 pages (German)
- Die Gründung der Stadt Peine. Älteste Quellen – jüngste Deutungen ( = Archiv Sonderblatt, 3/2007), Peine 2007; PDF, leaflet with 6 pages (German)
- 1948: „Sorgen um die Sicherheit“ – „Zahlen des Elends“ (= Archiv Sonderblatt, 1/2008), Peine 2008; PDF, leaflet with 6 pages (German)
- Querelen mit Stadtkommandant Mainau und seinen „Musquetieren“ 1743 ( = Archiv Sonderblatt, 2/2008), Peine 2008; PDF, leaflet with 6 pages (German)
- Wohnungs- und Schulnöte in der Nachkriegszeit ( = Archiv Sonderblatt, 1/2009), Peine 2009; PDF, leaflet with 6 pages (German)
- Frühe Peiner Eisenbahn-Initiative 1834 ( = Archiv Sonderblatt, 1/2010), Peine 2010; PDF, leaflet with 6 pages (German)
- Peiner Alltagsleben 1660 ( = Archiv Sonderblatt, 2/2010), Peine 2010; PDF, leaftlet with 6 pages (German)
- Streit um Hud und Weide im Barumer Moor 1631 ( = Archiv Sonderblatt, 2/2011), Peine 2011; PDF, leaflet with 6 pages (German)
- „Die stat Peine brende al ut ...“ Stadtbrände im 16. Jh. ( = Archiv Sonderblatt, 1/2012), Peine 2012; PDF, leaflet with 6 pages (German)
- Friedrich von Bodenstedt: „In der Heimath“ ( = Archiv Sonderblatt, 2/2012), Peine 2012; PDF, leaflet with 6 pages (German)
- 100. Todestag A.W. Krasnapolsky. 100 Jahre Herzberg ( = Archiv Sonderblatt, 4/2012), Peine 2012; PDF, leaflet with 6 pages (German)
- 125 Jahre zentrale Wasserversorgung. Peines Wassertürme ( = Archiv Sonderblatt, Bd. 1, 2013), Peine 2013; PDF, leaflet with 6 pages (German)
- 100 Jahre Simonstiftung Peine ( = Archiv Sonderblatt, Bd. 1, 2013), Peine 2013; PDF-Dokument, leaflet with 6 pages (German)
- Rudolf Otto. Peiner Theologe und Religionswissenschaftler ( = Archiv Sonderblatt, Bd. 3, 2013), Peine 2013; PDF, leaftlet with 6 pages
- Friedrich von Bodenstedt: Vom Schwarzen Meer nach Peine ( = Archiv-Sonderblatt, Nummer 2/2016), hrsg. vom Stadtarchiv Peine, 2016 (German)
- Einwohner- und Gewerbestatistik 1819 ( = Archiv-Sonderblatt, Nummer 1/2014), Peine 2014; PDF, leaflet with 6 pages (German)
- Peine 1904: „Scheußliche Dünste und Gerüche“ ( = Archiv-Sonderblatt, Nummer 2/2014), Peine 2014; PDF, leaflet with 6 pages (German)
- „Die Gast- und Schenckwirthschaften in der Stadt Peine“ im 19. Jahrhundert ( = Archiv-Sonderblatt, Nummer 3/2014), Peine 2014; PDF, leaftlet with 6 pages
- Friedrich von Bodenstedt: Von Tiflis zum Schwarzen Meer 1845 ( = Archiv-Sonderblatt, Nummer 1/2015), Peine 2015; PDF, leaflet with 6 pages (German)
- Schützenausmarsch 1835 ( = Archiv-Sonderblatt, Nummer 2/2015), Peine 2015; PDF (German)
- Neue Braupfanne für das städtische Brauhaus 1625 ( = Archiv-Sonderblatt, Nummer 3/2015), Peine 2015; PDF, leaflet with 6 pages (German)
- Feuerordnung für die Stadt Peine 1825 ( = Archiv-Sonderblatt, Nummer 4/2015), Peine 2015; PDF, leaflet with 6 pages
- Friedrich von Bodenstedt: Vom Schwarzen Meer nach Peine ( = Archiv-Sonderblatt, Nummer 2/2016), Peine 2016; PDF, leafet with 6 pages
- Die Zuckerfabrik an der Ilseder Straße ( = Archiv-Sonderblatt, Nummer 3/2016), hrsg. vom Stadtarchiv Peine, 2016; PDF, leaflet with 6 pages (German) and press information (German)
- Friedrich von Bodenstedt: Italienische Reise 1847/48, Archiv-Sonderblatt Nr. 1/2017, Peine 2017; PDF, leaflet with 6 pages (German)
- Anschluss der Dammgemeinde an die Stadt 1852 ( = Archiv Sonderblatt, 3/2017), Peine 2017; PDF, leaflet with 6 pages (German) and Die Dammgemeinde – Seit 165 Jahren bei der Stadt Peine, press information with media data (German)
- Kostenstreit um Neubau der Wache vor dem Hohen Tor 1777. Kostenstreit um Neubau von Zugbrücke, Stockhaus und Wache vor dem Hohen Tor 1777 ( = Archiv-Sonderblatt, Nr. 4/2017), Peine: Stadt Peine, 2017; PDF, leaftlet with 6 pages
- Zur Geschichte der Peine–Ilseder Eisenbahn und Hochbahn ( = Archiv-Sonderblatt, Nr. 1/2018), Peine 2018; (German)PDF, leaftlet with 6 pages (German)
- Streit um die Besetzung der Stadttore 1732 ( = Archiv-Sonderblatt, Nr. 2/2018), Peine: Stadt Peine, 2018 PDF, leaftlet with 6 pages (German)
- „Liederlicher Lebenswandel und wilde Ehe“ im 19. Jahrhundert, Archiv-Sonderblatt, Peine: Stadt Peine, 2018 leaflet with 6 pages (German)
- Die Peiner Eule. Die Geschichte, wie aus einem Spottnamen ein ein Wahrzeichen wurde ..., Hrsg. Peine Marketing, Peine 2020; (German)PDF, 17 pages (German)
- Friedrich von Bodenstedt (* 22.04.1819 in Peine; † 18.04.1892 in Wiesbaden). Die „Lieder des Mirza Schaffy“ – ein Megaseller des 19. Jahrhunderts, Peine [o.D.]; PDF-Dokument, 2 S.
