= Hans Michael Finger =

Hans Michael Finger (born September 15, 1875, in Bottendorf; died 1964 in Peine) was a German teacher and head of the district home office in Peine.

== Life ==
After graduating with the title Born in the then province of Hesse-Nassau, Hans Michael Finger. worked after graduating with the title of Studienrat, Hans Michael Finger worked at the Peiner Lyceum. At the beginning of the 20th century he was already a prominent figure in Peine, when the Peiner Zeitung, on the occasion of the festive assembly for the inauguration of the new synagogue on August 30, 1907, explicitly named senior teacher Finger "from the higher girls' school" as the only representative of the bourgeoisie.

Finger, who had previously worked as a senior teacher in Peine, took over the management of the private further education school for women opened on January 16, 1911, by the Frauenwohl association, until April 1, 1918, when it was in municipal administration as the municipal commercial school for girls was subordinated to the vocational school, which later became Peiner Commercial School.

After the First World War, on the initiative of the Peine city school board in Bruns, the adult education center in Peine had started its activities on November 3, 1919. The public education office of the city and the district of Peine opened in December 1920 following a compliant decision by the city and district councils. At the same time, Hans Michael Finger, who at the time acted as spokesman for the community council, took over the management of the new office, into which the adult education center was then also integrated. In addition, in his new position as organizer, he was also responsible for "concerts, showing cultural films and theater performances".

Also in the winter of 1920, Finger created the further "cultural guideline" within the framework of the People's Education Office, especially for the city's theater system. He initiated the establishment of a style stage in the hall of the German House, for which the ensemble of the Braunschweig State Theater was engaged to guest performances. Already in the first half of winter 1920 he organized 31 theater performances in Peine. Finger's request for a guest performance by the Hanoverian court actress Anna Meyer-Glenk in 1921, in connection with the public education office, finally led to the building for the ensemble of the town's theater Peiner Festsäle.

After the National Socialists took power in early 1933, Finger was not only able to assert himself as one of the central figures in the cultural life of the city, but was even able to establish an almost monopoly position. In addition, he continued to head the People's Education Office until the authority "had to give way to new party institutions." After the November pogroms of 1938, numerous members of the Jewish communities were driven out of their homes, taken to concentration camps or even – like the 17-year-old Hans Marburger – were murdered, The cultural functionary and teacher Hans Michael Finger and the mayor of Pein, Wiard Bronleewe, played a key role "in the distribution of Jewish property". Finger justified the theft of the Biedermeier room of the Sostmann family for the local local history museum with the fact that the furniture of the Sostmanns "had nothing Jewish about it."

Finger was head of the Peiner district home office and in this function he managed, among other things, the local war chronicle, which he compiled mainly from a collection of materials up to the end of the World War II. After the imminent shelling of Peine by American tank troops Hans Michael Finger, mayor Wiard Bronleewe and others from the Peine command post went to surrender to the American commander Captain Daniel A. Grundmann in Rosenthal in the morning of April 10, 1945. Finger was acting as an interpreter. Thanks to Finger's explanations, the further bombardment of Peine was averted almost at the last minute. A photograph of the handover of the city to the commander Captain Grundmann was taken, which also showed the interpreter Hans-Michael Finger, the provisional district administrator Max Heinemann, the mayor of Bronleewe and the hospital director Heinrich Meyeringh and later ended up in the archive of the military historian Karl-Heinz Heineke.

== Works ==
- as author: H. M. Finger (Verf.), August Wietfeld (Vorrede): Die Stadt Peine, hrsg. im Auftrag des Volksbildungsamtes für Stadt und Kreis Peine ( = Monographien Deutscher Städte), Essen; Hannover: Deutscher Städte-Verlag, 1926 table of contents
- as editor: H. M. Finger (Hrsg.), August Köster: Geschichte der Stadt Peine und ihrer Umgebung: Mit Beiträgen über Entstehung und Wappen der Stadt / Im Auftrag der Stadtverwaltung

== Archival materials ==
Archival materials by and about Hans Michael Finger can be found, for example in the city archive of Peine as a deposit finger, 43 numbers of the "Handakten des Leiters des Kreisheimatwerkes“ ("hand files of the head of the district home office") for the period 1880 to 1945
