= National Botanical Garden of Georgia =

Botanical Garden in Tbilisi, Georgia

Coordinates: 41°41′10″N 44°48′27″E

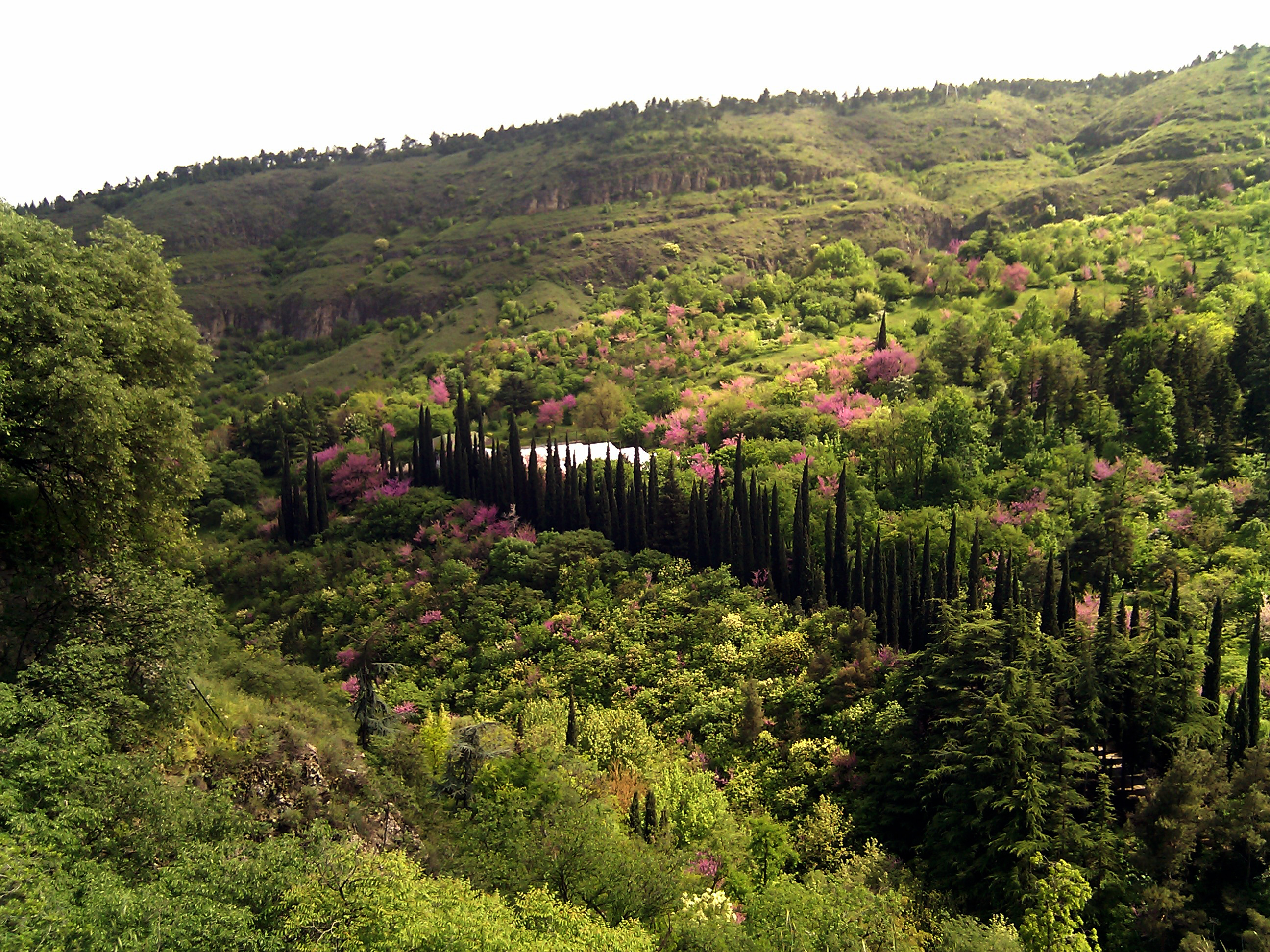
Tbilisi Botanical Garden is concealed from view as it resides between the hills of the Sololaki Range

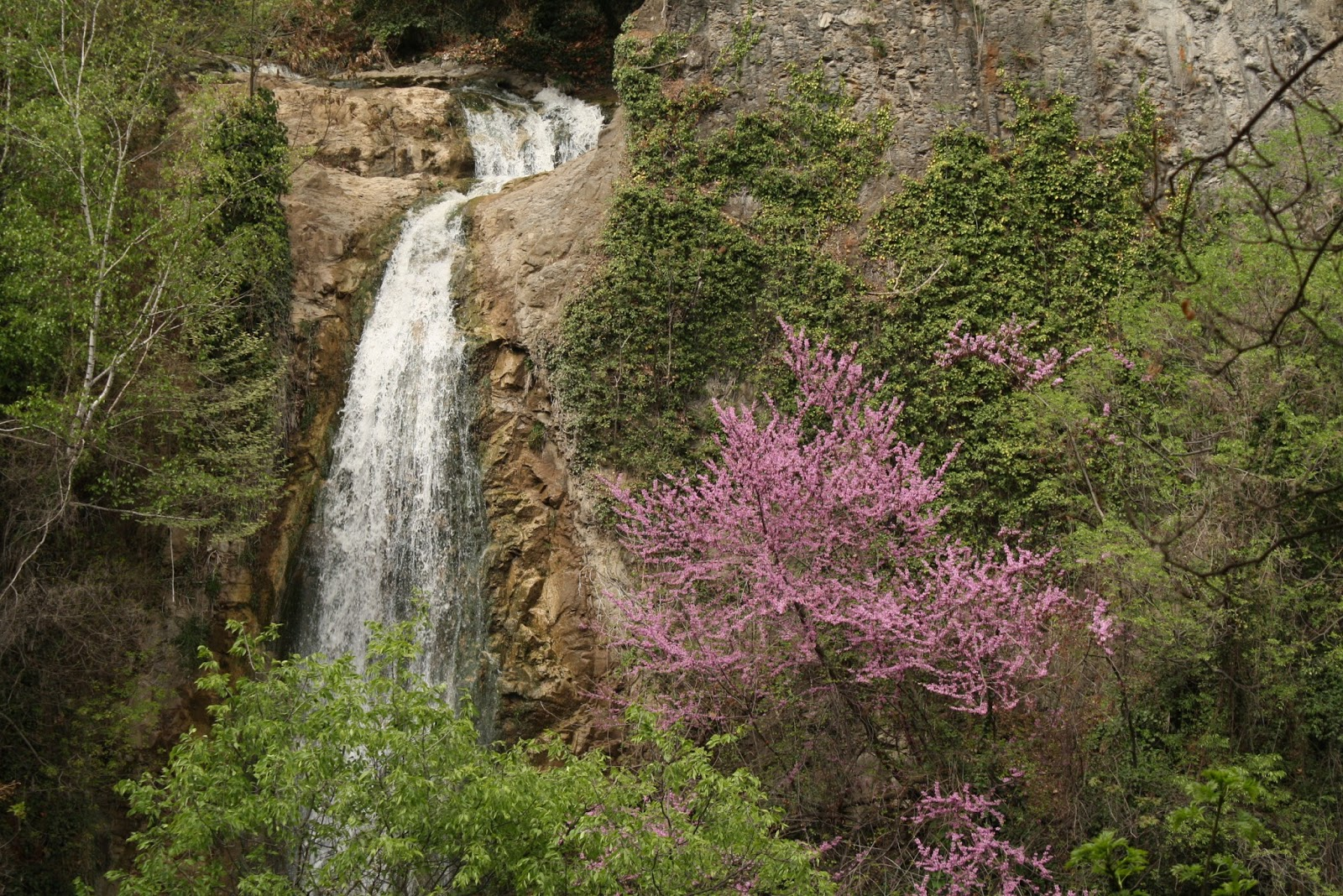
Waterfall, Tbilisi Botanical Garden, Georgia

The National Botanical Garden of Georgia (Georgian: საქართველოს ეროვნული ბოტანიკური ბაღი), formerly the Tbilisi Botanical Garden (Georgian: თბილისის ბოტანიკური ბაღი), is located in Tbilisi, capital of Georgia, and lies in the Tsavkisis-Tskali Gorge on the southern foothills of the Sololaki Range (a spur of the Trialeti Range). It occupies an area of 161 hectares and possesses a collection of over 4,500 taxonomic groups.

Its history spans more than three centuries. It was first described in 1671 by the French traveller Jean Chardin as royal gardens, which might have been founded at least in 1625 and were variably referred to as "fortress gardens" or "Seidabad gardens" later in history. The gardens appear in the records by Joseph Pitton de Tournefort (1701) and on the Tbilisi, map composed by Prince Vakhushti (1735). Pillaged in the Persian invasion of 1795, the garden was revived in the early 19th century and officially established as the Tiflis Botanical Garden in 1845.

From 1888 on, when a floristics center was set up, Yuri Voronov and several other notable scholars have worked for the Garden. Between 1896 and 1904, the Garden was expanded further westward. Between 1932 and 1958, the territory around the former Muslim cemetery was included in the botanical garden. Several graves have survived, however, including that of the prominent Azerbaijani writer Mirza Fatali Akhundov (1812-1878). The central entrance to the Garden is located at the foothills of the Narikala Fortress. The other, cut through the rock as a long tunnel in 1909–14, had been functional until the mid-2000s when the tunnel was converted into Georgia's largest nightclub "Gvirabi".

In 2018, the garden was renovated to include cycling and walking lanes; the construction was in part paid for by the Kartu Foundation.

== Gallery ==
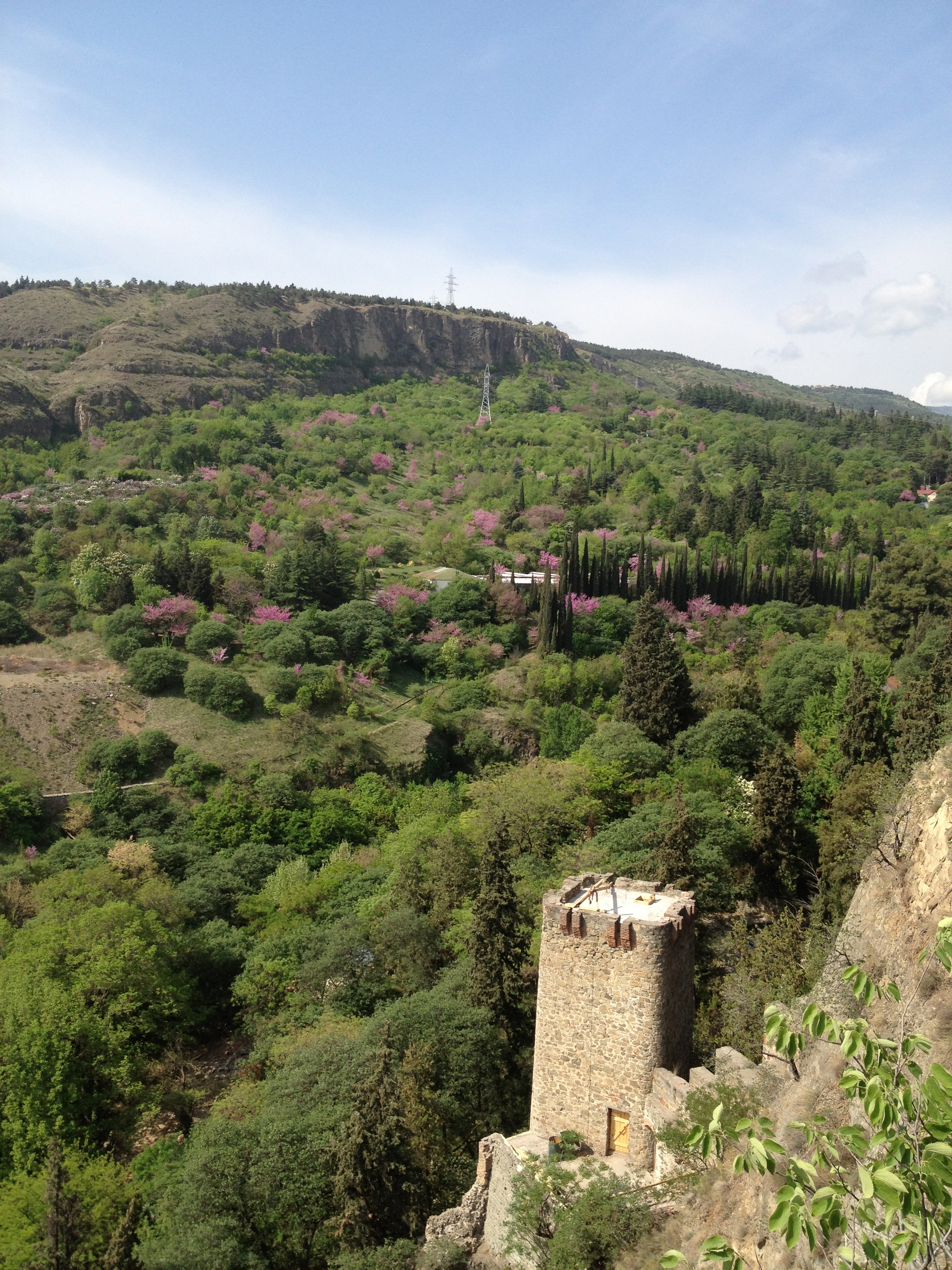
Tbilisi Botanical Garden and the ruins of Narikala

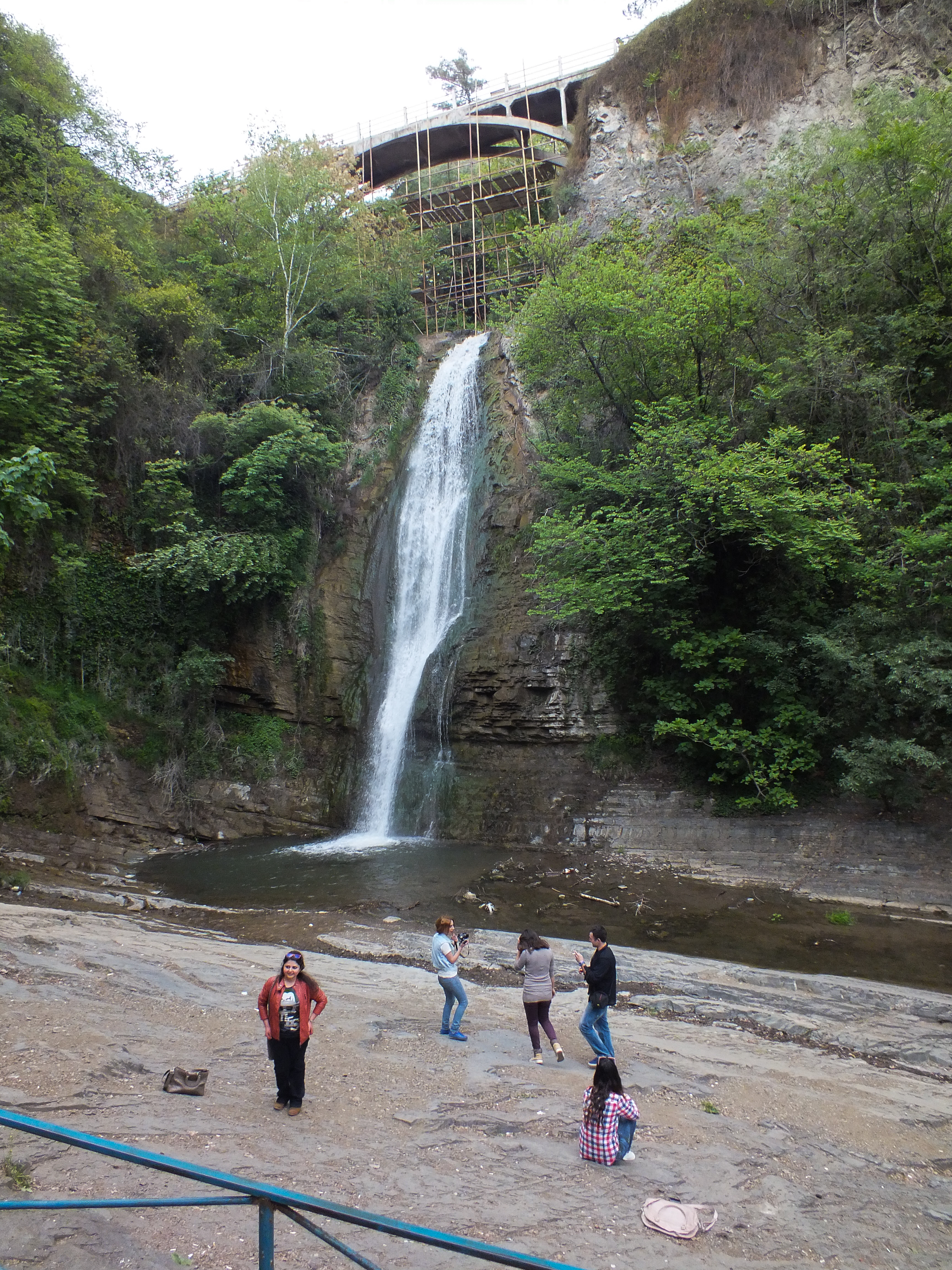
An arched bridge over the waterfall in the Tbilisi Botanical Garden constructed in 1914

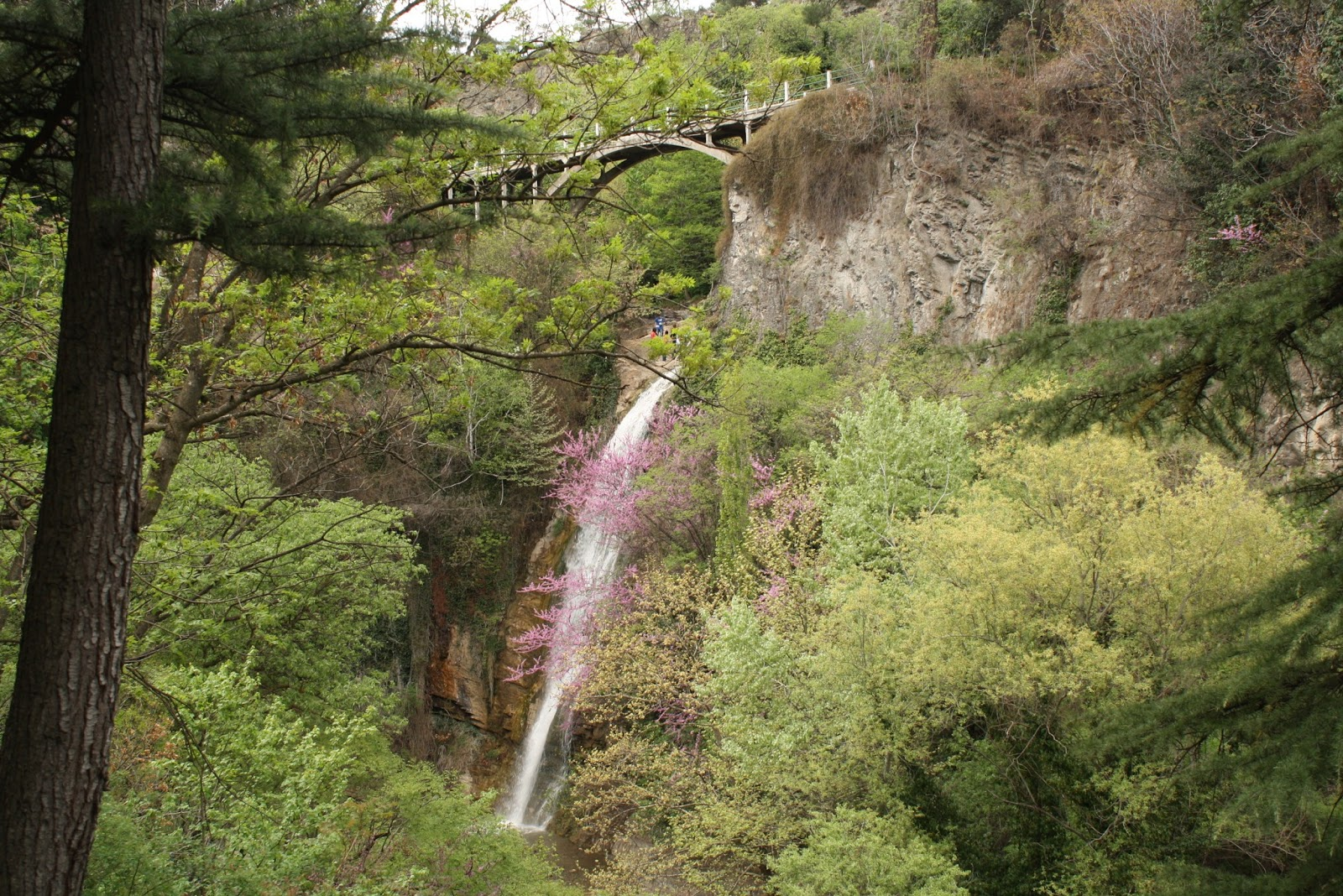
Tbilisi Botanical Garden in spring
