= Mirza Shafi Vazeh =

19th-century Azerbaijani poet

- Mirzə Şəfi Vazeh
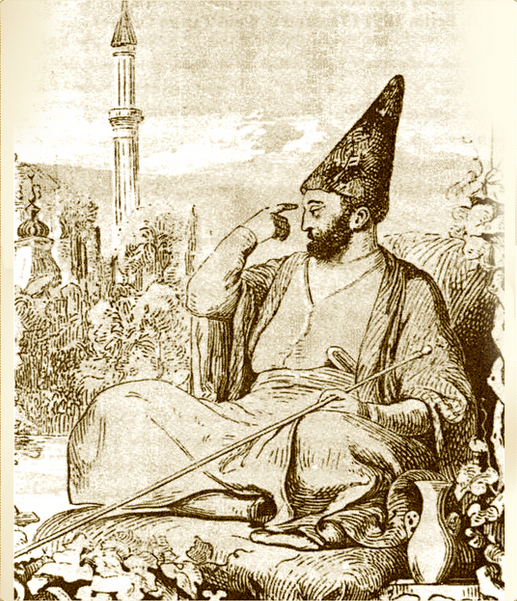
- Illustration of Vazeh in Tausend und ein Tag im Orient by Friedrich von Bodenstedt (1850)
- Born: Mirza Shafi Sadykh-oglu c. 1800; Ganja, Ganja Khanate
- Died: 16 November 1852; Tiflis, Russian Empire
- Resting place: Pantheon of prominent Azerbaijanis
- Occupations: Poet, teacher
- Writing career
- Pen name: Vazeh
- Language: Azerbaijani, Persian
- Genres: Poems, specifically ghazals, mukhammas, mathnawis and rubais

Mirza Shafi Vazeh (Azerbaijani: Mirzə Şəfi Vazeh; میرزا شفیع واضح; c. 1800 – 16 November 1852) was an Azerbaijani poet and teacher. Under the pseudonym "Vazeh", which means "expressive, clear", he wrote in both Azerbaijani and Persian, developing the traditions of poetry in both languages. He compiled the first anthology of Azerbaijani poetry and a Tatar-Russian dictionary for the Tiflis gymnasium with Russian teacher Ivan Grigoriev.

He wrote multiple ghazals, mukhammases, mathnawis and rubais. His poems are mostly intimate, lyrical and satirical. The main theme of Vazeh's works is the glorification of romantic love and the joy of life, but in some of his poems, he denounces the vices of feudal society and opposes slavery and religious fanaticism.

The German poet Friedrich von Bodenstedt, who took oriental language lessons from Vazeh, published translations of Vazeh's poems in his book A Thousand and One Days in the East in 1850. Bodenstedt's book, titled Songs of Mirza Shafi, was published in 1851.

== Life ==
=== Birth date ===
Mirza Shafi Sadykh oglu was born c. 1800 in Ganja. The exact date of his birth is disputed. Soviet-era encyclopedias such as the Great Soviet Encyclopedia, the Concise Literary Encyclopedia and the Philosophical Encyclopedia state that Mirza Shafi was born in 1796, (Note: Prokhorov, Alexander (1967). "Вазех". Great Soviet Encyclopedia. 30 (3 ed.).; Mamedov, N. (1962). "Вазех" [Vazekh]. In Surkov, A. A. (ed.). Concise Literary Encyclopedia. 1.; Seidzade, Aliajdar. "Вазех" [Vazekh]. In Konstantinov, Fyodor (ed.). Philosophical Encyclopedia.) but a number of authors write that he was born in 1794. (Note: Mirzoeva Sh. (1981). Из истории эстетической мысли Азербайджана (XIX — начало XX века) [From the history of aesthetic thought of Azerbaijan (XIX – early XX century)]. p. 38.; Mammad Arif (1971). История азербайджанской литературы [History of Azerbaijani literature]. p. 97.; История Азербайджана [History of Azerbaijan]. 2. Baku: Publishing House of the Academy of Sciences of the Azerbaijan SSR. 1960. p. 116.; Qasymov M.M. (1959). Очерки по истории передовой философской и общественно-политической мысли азербайджанского народа в XIX веке [Essays on the history of progressive philosophical and socio-political thought of the Azerbaijani people in the 19th century]. Azerbaijan State University. p. 46.) According to Willem Floor and Hasan Javadi in The Heavenly Rose-garden: A History of Shirvan & Daghestan, by Abbas Qoli Aqa Bakikhanov, Vazeh was born in 1792.

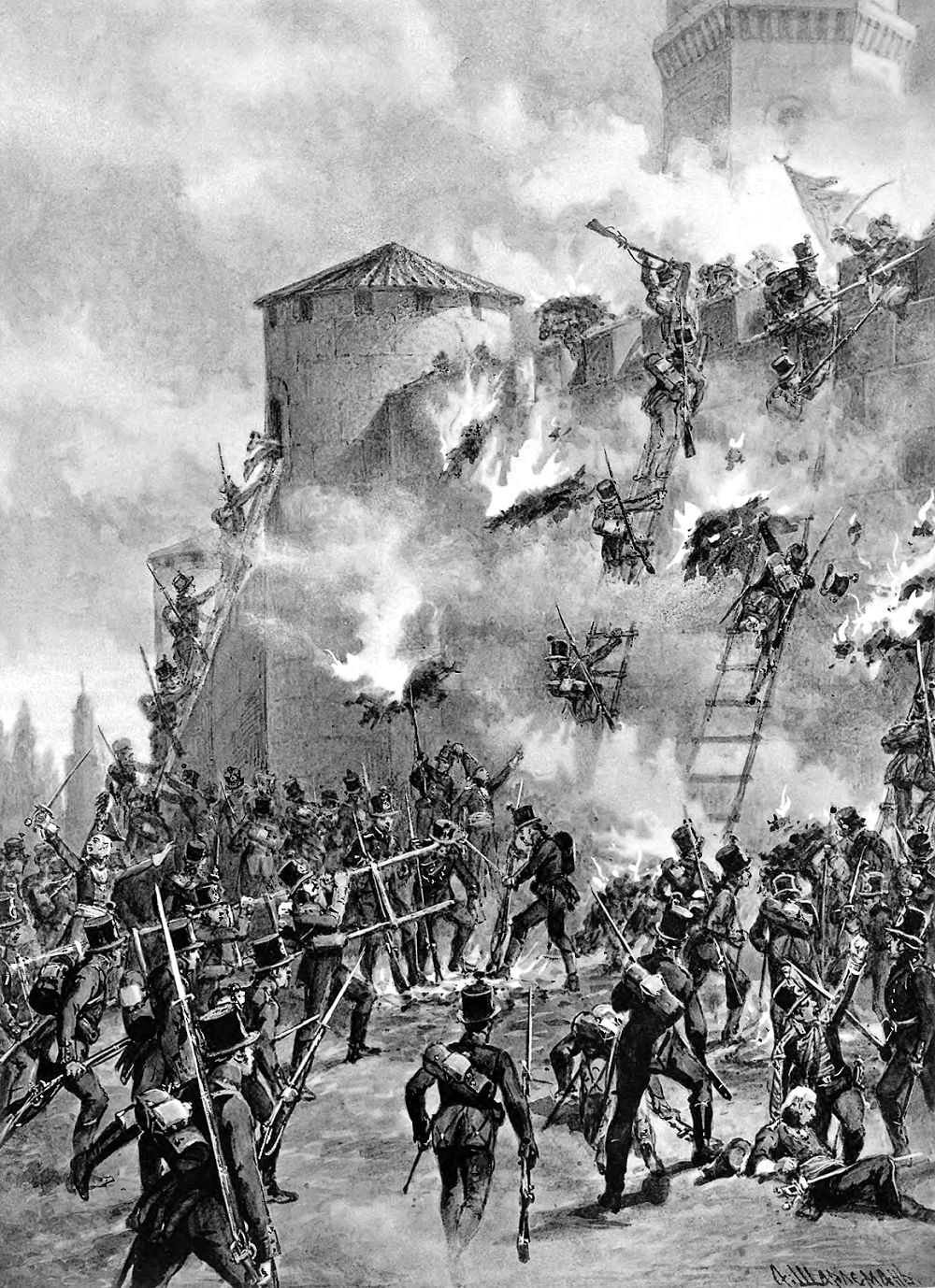
"Battle of Ganja" by Adolf Charlemagne depicting the Russian attack on Ganja Fortress

According to the orientalist Adolf Berge, he saw Mirza Shafi Vazeh, whom he described as "a modest, about 60-year-old Tatar" in the streets of Tiflis in 1851. This would suggest the poet was born before 1800. Archival documents contain completely different information. In the "Official List of Service for 1845" (Russian: Формулярном списке о службе за 1845 год) it is written that Mirza Shafi is 40 years old. This would mean Vazeh was born in 1805. At the same time, in the "Official List of Service for 1852" (Russian: Формулярном списке о службе за 1852 год), it is written that he is 45 years old, indicating that he was born in 1807. According to orientalist Ivan Yenikolopov, the most trustworthy source is the "Official List of Service for 1845", which was approved by Mirza Shafi's commander-in-chief, A.K. Monastyrski.

=== Early life ===
Mirza Shafi's father was Sadykh Kerbalayi, more commonly known as Usta Sadykh, who served as an architect for Javad Khan, the last khan of the Ganja Khanate. The poet's elder brother, Abdul-Ali, became an architect like his father.

Mirza Shafi was born in the years of the Russian conquest of the Caucasus. In 1804, Russian forces besieged and eventually captured Mirza Shafi's hometown, Ganja. After its fall, General Pavel Tsitsianov renamed Ganja Elisabethpol (in honour of Russian empress Elizabeth Alexeievna) and integrated the khanate's territory as part of the Georgia Governorate of the Russian Empire. Mirza Shafi's family was seriously affected by these events as his father lost his income.

Orientalist Adolf Berge, citing Mirza Fatali Akhundov, an Azerbaijani critic, noted that after the fall of the Ganja Khanate, Mirza Shafi's father went bankrupt, then fell ill and later died. His father's death date is unknown, though literary critic Aliadjar Seidzade argues he died in early 1805. Mirza Shafi's father's bankruptcy is confirmed by a letter sent from a poet by the name of Shakir to poet Gasim bey Zakir, in which Sadykh from Ganja (Mirza Shafi's father), along with a certain Haji-Qurban, are mentioned as being rich men, who became completely impoverished.

According to historian Mikhail Semevsky, Mirza Shafi was "a kind, simple man who was Tatar (Note: The word "Tatar" at the time was used by Russian authors to refer to modern Azerbaijanis) by origin, and Persian by upbringing".

=== Education ===
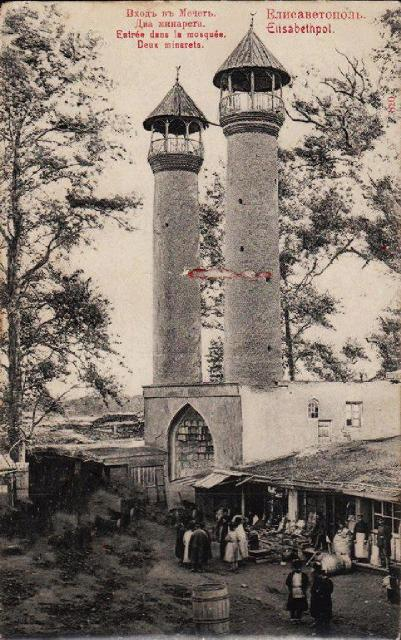
Shah Abbas Mosque of Ganja where Mirza Shafi studied

Shafi's interest in books and science was evident from an early age. Because of this, his father sent him to the madrasa at the Shah Abbas Mosque in Ganja. His father wanted him to become a mullah. Shafi's interests and abilities grew at the madrasa, where he learned Persian and Arabic language and was taught calligraphy. Adolf Berge wrote in an article published in the journal Zeitschrift der Deutschen Morgenländischen Gesellschaft:

His success in the study of the Arabic language was not great, the second language though (that is, Persian) he mastered, as it was possible, without a thorough knowledge of Arabic.

Shafi did not want to become a mullah but wanted to learn literature and different languages instead. As his father was alive, Shafi did not want to go against his wishes. He continued his education in the madrasa until his father's death. At the time of his father's death, while Shafi was still studying in the madrasa, Haji Abdullah returned from Tabriz to Ganja. According to Adolf Berje, Haji Abdullah was "of remarkable spiritual qualities and high morality". He played a significant role in shaping Shafi's personality.

According to Adolf Berge, Haji Abdullah was born in Ganja and went to Tabriz to engage in trade. In Persia, he visited holy places and made a pilgrimage to Mecca. Later, he lived in Baghdad for some time where he met a dervish named Seid Sattar, who taught him about Sufism. After returning to Ganja, Haji Abdullah argued constantly with the local mullahs and akhoonds (Muslim clerics) of the Shah Abbas mosque, trying to prove the inconsistency and absurdity of religious prejudices and superstitions. Because of this, he made enemies of most of the local clergy.

Haji Abdullah enlightened Shafi. Seeing the change in Shafi's mindset, the madrasa's mullahs refused to continue teaching him. After this, Shafi was forced to leave the madrasa and from this point, according to Berge, the development of Shafi's complete contempt for the clergy began. In his arguments with the mullahs, Shafi supported Haji Abdullah, who, according to Aliadjar Seizade, adopted him.

=== Teaching in Tiflis ===
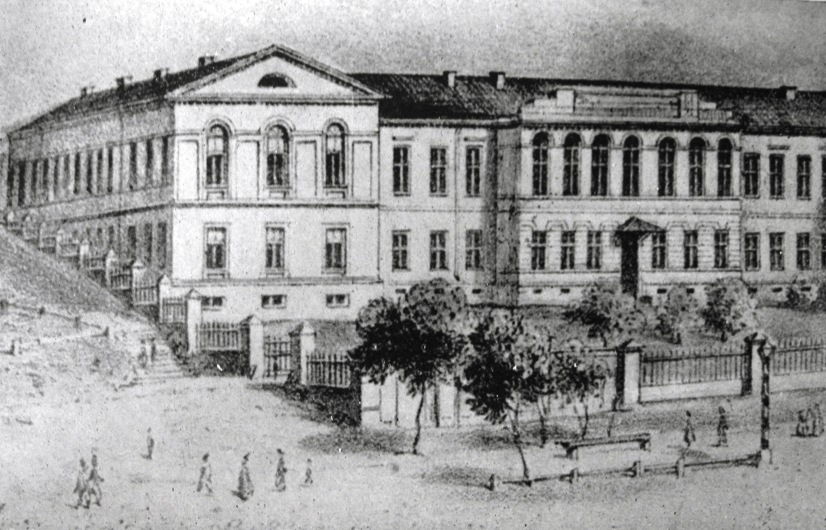
Tiflis Gymnasium where Mirza Shafi worked as a teacher

In the 1830s to the 1840s, Mirza Shafi earned money working as a servant for wealthy people. In Elisabethpol, he also taught oriental languages and calligraphy. Shafi moved to Tiflis in 1840, where he became a teacher. There he established close ties with other prominent figures like Khachatur Abovian, Abbasgulu Bakikhanov and Mirza Fatali Akhundov, who was also his student.

He moved back to Elisabethpol in 1846 and continued to work as a teacher and write poetry until 1850 when he moved back to Tiflis. He began working in the Tiflis Gymnasium and taught the Persian and Azerbaijani languages.

==== Vazeh and Bodenstedt ====
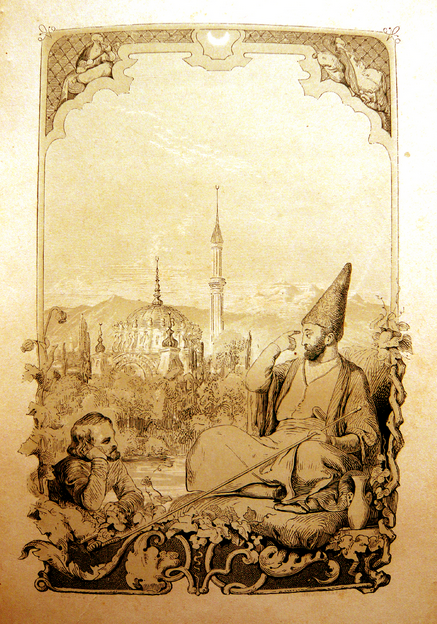
Illustration of Vazeh and Bodenstedt

In 1844, the German writer and orientalist Friedrich von Bodenstedt, who showed a great interest in the life of the Caucasus and wished to take lessons in oriental languages, came to Tiflis. Soon after his arrival there he met Shafi, who taught him the Azerbaijani and Persian languages.

Bodenstedt left Tiflis in 1848, taking with him a notebook of poems by Mirza Shafi entitled The Key of Wisdom. In 1850, he published a voluminous book called A Thousand and One Days in the East, part of which included works by Shafi. He compiled another book called Songs of Mirza-Shafi which consisted of his translations of Shafi's poems. Twenty years after Shafi's death, Bodenstedt published a book titled From the Heritage of Mirza Shafi, in which he claimed that the poems were not translations from Mirza Shafi but were his own work. Nevertheless, the originals in Persian and Azerbaijani languages have survived to this day, proving the authorship of Mirza Shafi.

=== Death ===
According to the historian Mikhail Semevsky, Adolf Berge met "a modest, about 60-year-old Tatar" who was a teacher in one of the Muslim schools. It was Mirza Shafi Vazeh. When Berge looked for him the following year in order to get to know him, Shafi had died. Berge wrote in his notes that Shafi had died from gastritis on the night of 16 November 1852.

The day of Vazeh's death was marked by a note in the Acts of the Caucasian Archaeological Commission and the poet was buried in the Muslim cemetery in Tiflis (now known as the Pantheon of prominent Azerbaijanis).

== Literary activity ==
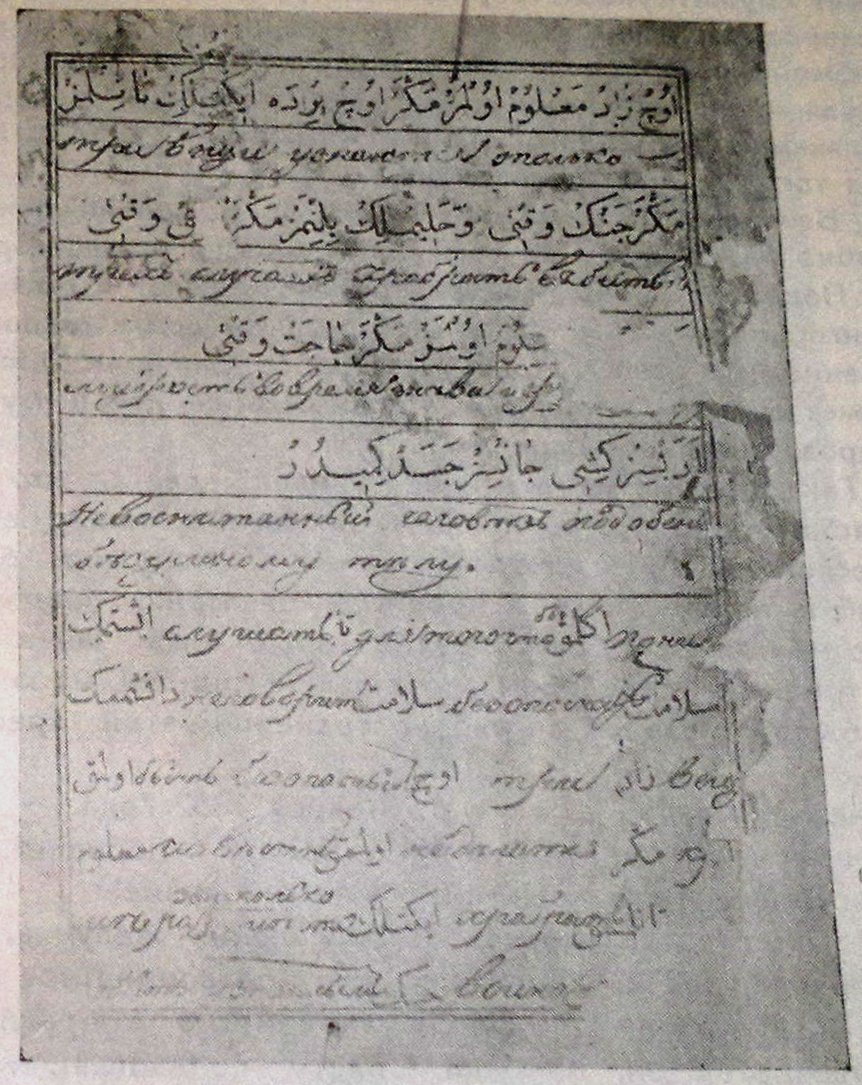
Page from the Tatar Reader of the Azerbaijan dialect by Mirza Shafi Vazeh

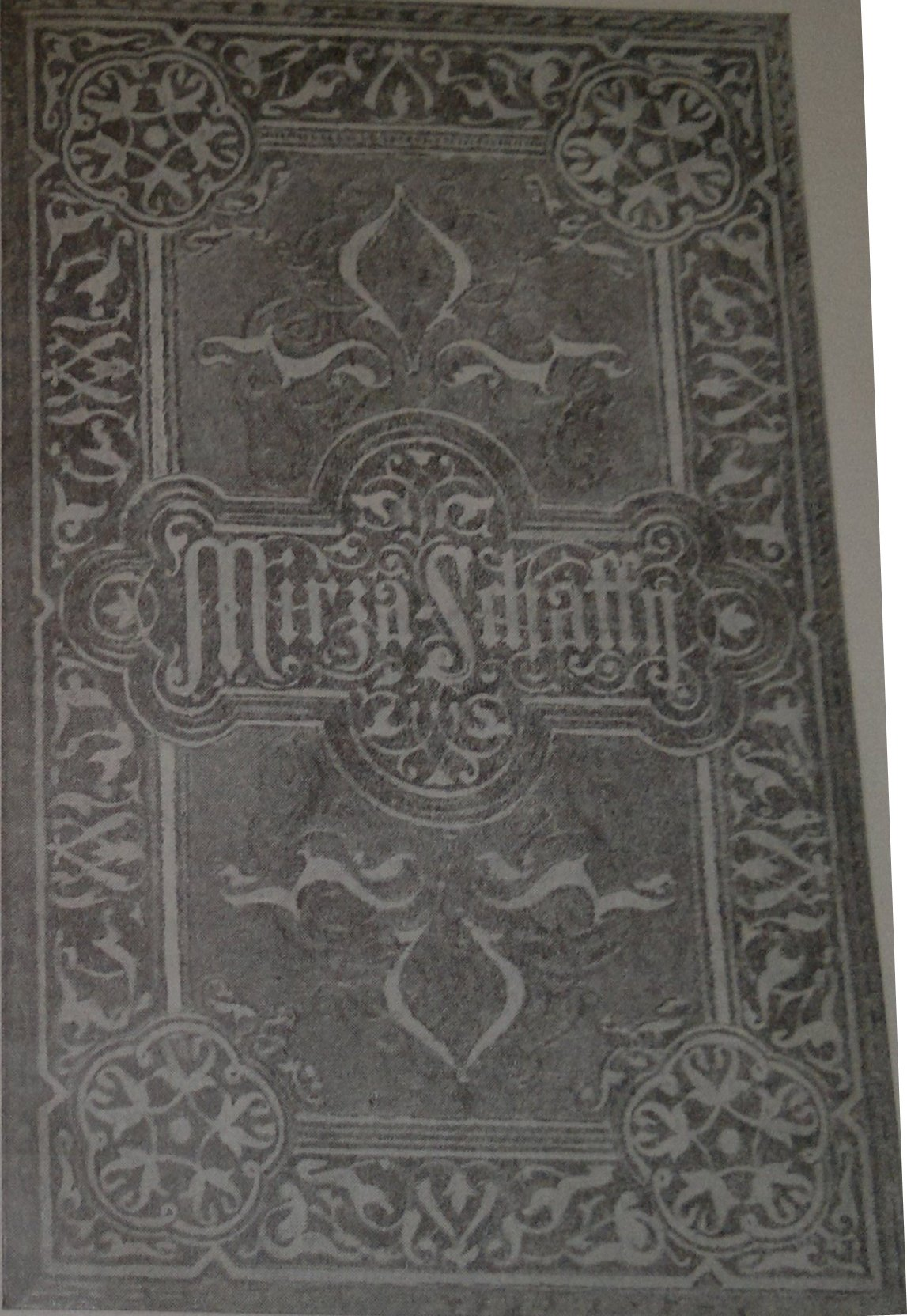
Cover of the German edition of Songs of Mirza Shafi

The main theme of Shafi's works was the glorification of romantic love and the joy of life, but in some of his poems he denounced the vices of feudal society, opposed slavery and religious fanaticism. He compiled the first anthology of Azerbaijani poetry and a Tatar-Russian dictionary for the Tiflis gymnasium with Russian teacher Ivan Grigoriev.

Until the 1960s, it was believed that the literary legacy of Mirza Shafi Vazeh had been passed on only in the form of translations and that the originals of his poems were lost. In the 31 January 1963 issue of Literaturnaya Gazeta, it was reported that the originals of Mirza Shafi's poems in Azerbaijani and Persian had been found. Only a few of his works have survived, most were translated by Naum Grebnev and Bodenstedt from Azerbaijani and Persian and were included in the book Vazeh. M.-Sh. Lyrica.

Bodenstedt cited one characteristic of Shafi—his dislike of printed books. According to the poet, "real professors do not need printing". Shafi himself was an excellent calligrapher. Bodenstedt writes:

Mirza Shafi wrote very delicately and at the same time brought beauty and variety: he adapted letters to the content of the text. If he had to write about ordinary things, then he clothed them in everyday clothes, beautiful ones in festive clothes, in letters to women he wrote with special thin handwriting.

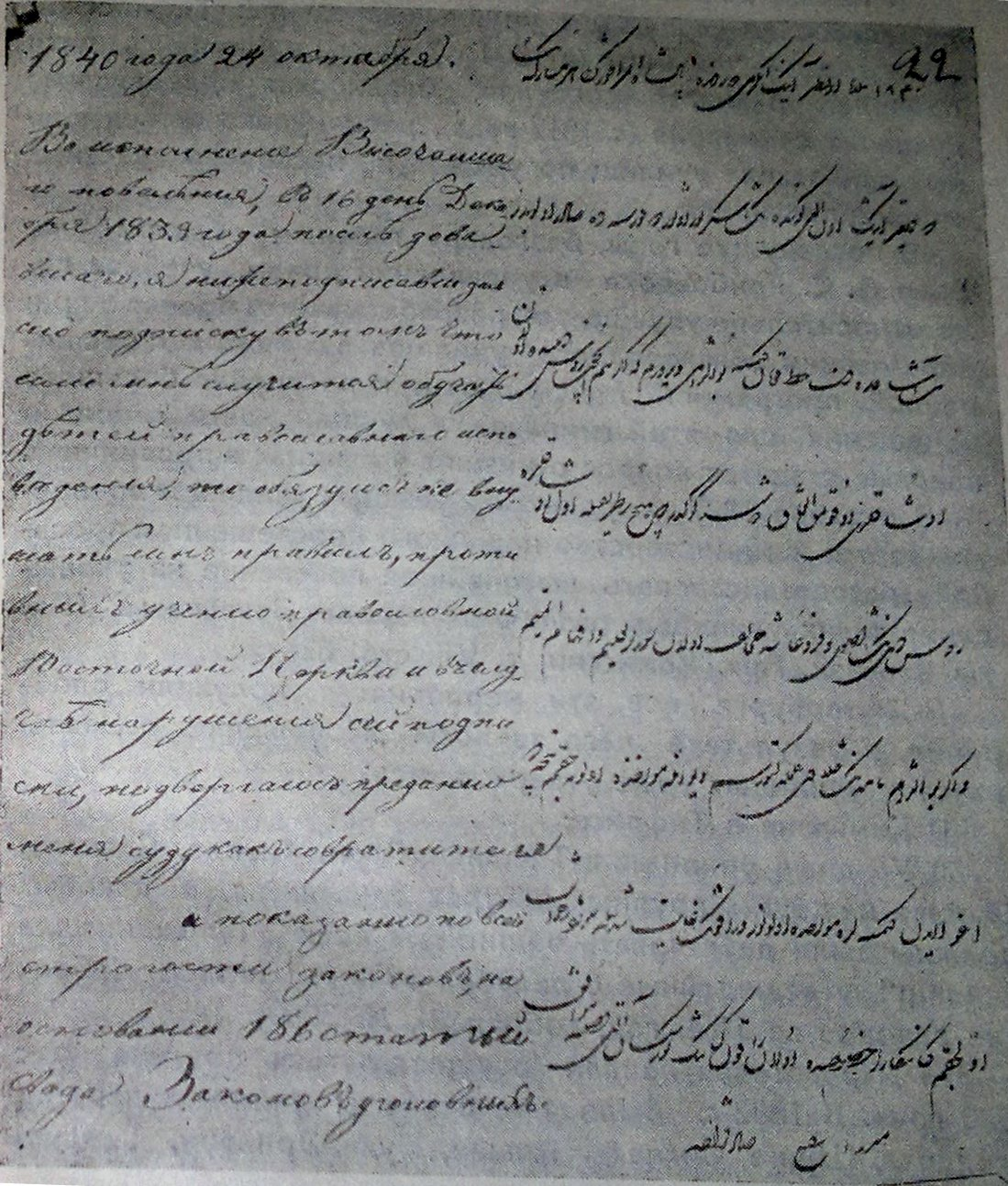
Autograph of Mirza Shafi

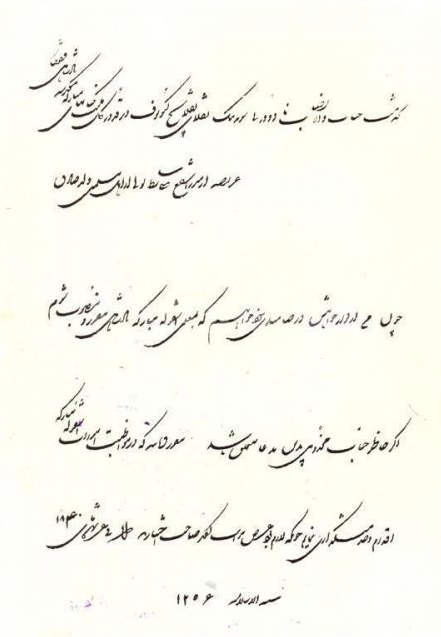
Letter of Vazeh

In his memoirs, Mirza Fatali Akhundov wrote that Vazeh "had the art of writing in beautiful handwriting, known by the name nastaliq". Bodenstedt translated and spread the works of Vazeh. In 1850, he published the book A Thousand and One Days in the East in Stuttgart, where he included some of Vazeh's poems. A year later, they were published separately in Berlin in German under the title Songs of Mirza Shafi. These poems became so popular that they were reissued every year and translated into many languages. The Songs of Mirza Shafi was first translated into Russian by N. I. Eifert. In 1880, he wrote: The Songs of Mirza Shafi, which have already survived up to 60 editions, is one of the most beloved works of modern poetry in Germany." They have been translated into English, French, Italian, Persian, Hungarian, Czech, Swedish, Dutch, Flemish, Danish, Spanish, Portuguese, most Slavic languages and Hebrew.

The translation into Italian was done by Giacomo Rossi. Russian poet Mikhail Larionovitch Mikhailov translated Shafi's poems into Russian. Shafi's poems also came to the attention of Leo Tolstoy, who told Afanasy Fet in 1880 that they had made a deep impression him.

Research into Shafi's writings is far from complete and continues in Azerbaijan to this day.

== Legacy ==
Mirza Shafi's works and personality continued to influence Azerbaijani literature after his death. He became the inspiration of the Haji Nuri character in Mirza Fatali Akhundov's play, Hekayat-e Molla Ebrahim Khalil kimiagar.

There are several streets, schools and parks named in his honour, such as the "Mirza Shafi" streets in Tbilisi and Baku, the No.16 middle school and the "Shafi" park in Ganja. In 2010, a memorial plaque was installed for Bodenstedt and Vazeh in Bodenstedt's hometown, Peine, Germany. Similarly, a bust was erected in Ganja in honour of Shafi.

Transfer of the works of Mirza Shafi from Germany to Ganja began in 2014 and a museum dedicated to him was opened in Ganja in November 2017. In 2026 an event in Tbilisi marked the 232rd anniversary of Mirza Shafi's birth.

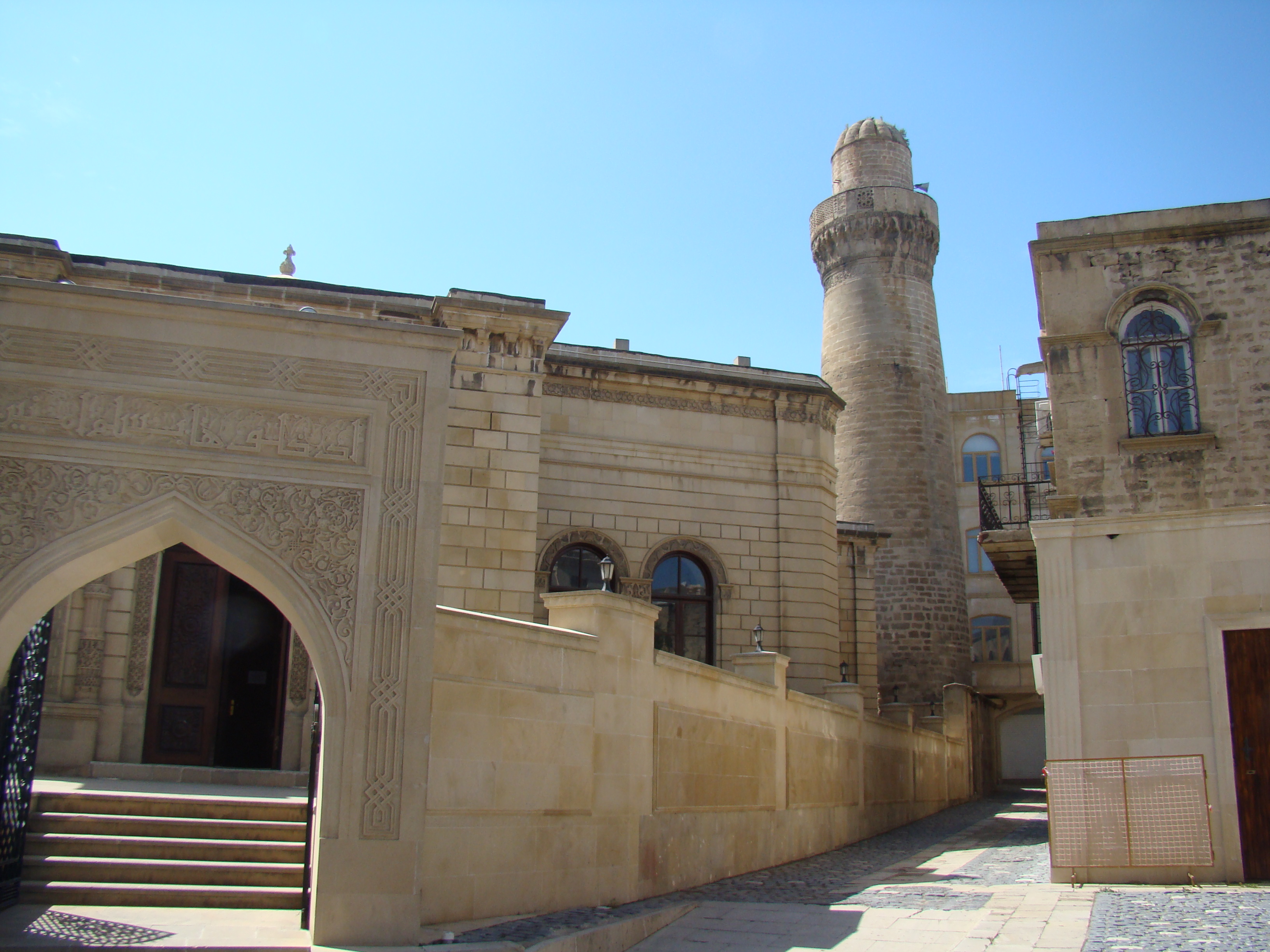
Mirza Shafi Street in Baku

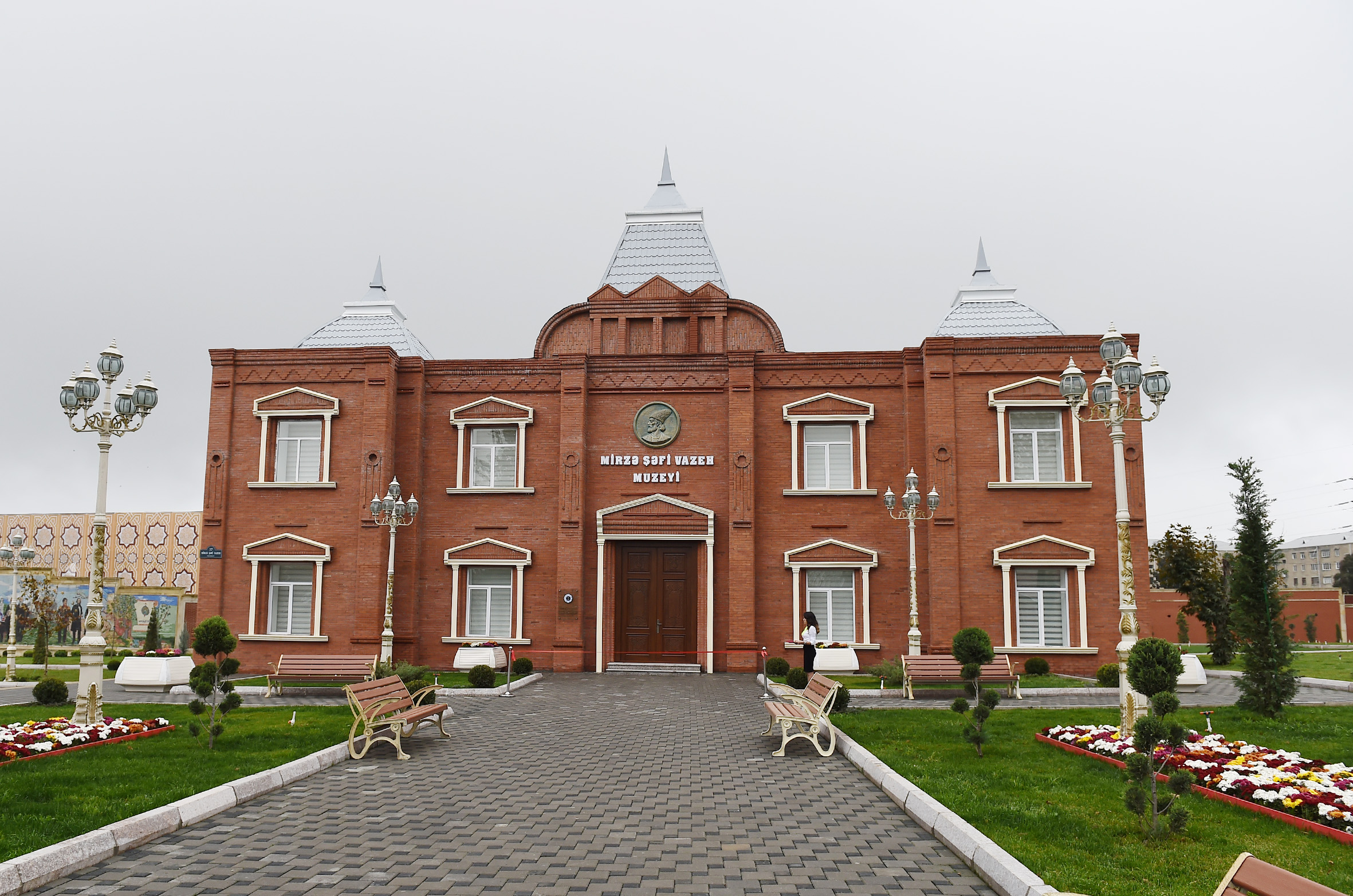
Mirza Shafi Vazeh museum in Ganja
