= Pantheon of prominent Azerbaijanis =

Memorial cemetery in Tbilisi, Georgia

- აზერბაიჯანელ მოღვაწეთა პანთეონი; Görkəmli Azərbaycanlılar panteonu
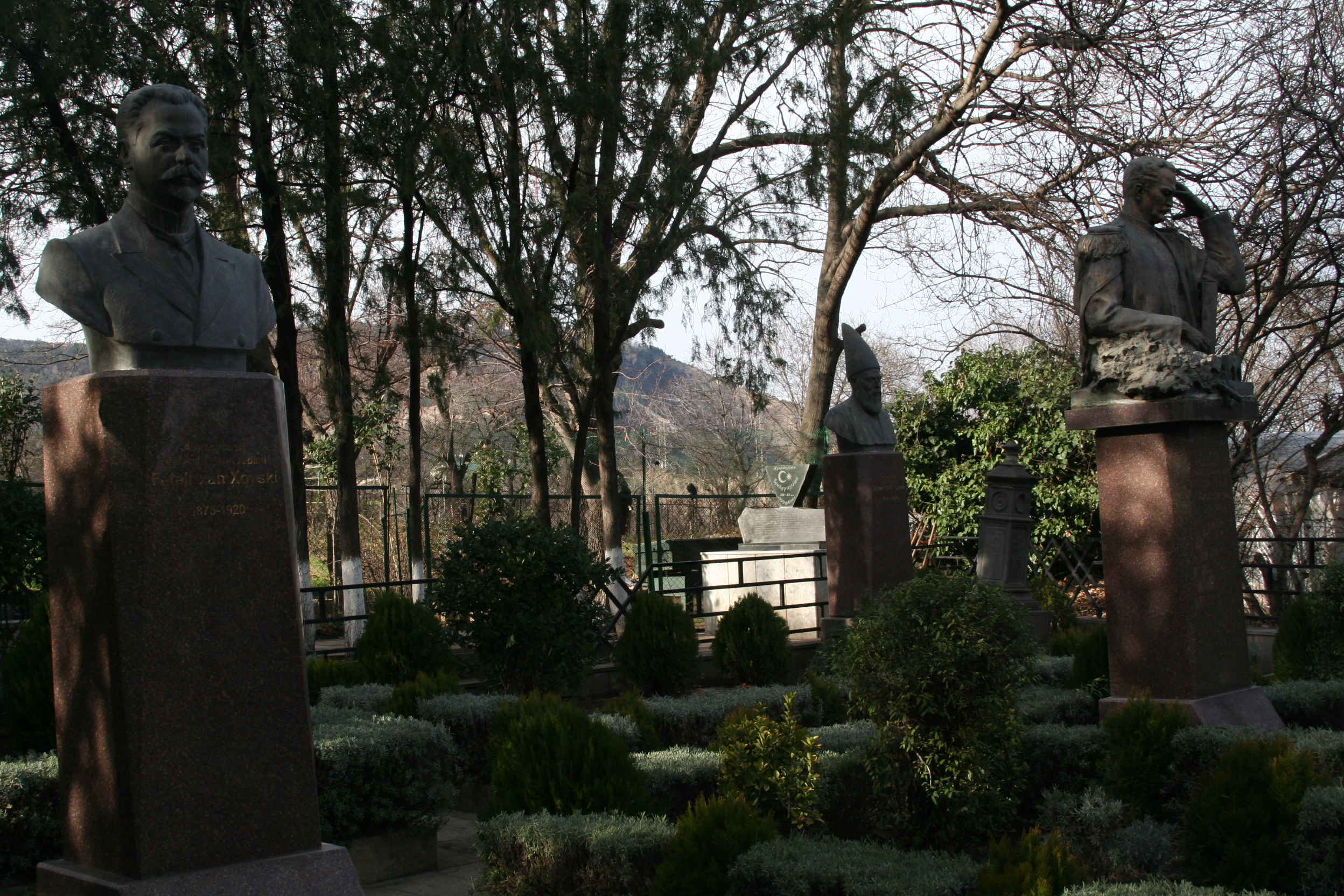
- Monuments of Fatali Khan Khoyski, Mirza Fatali Akhundov and Mirza Shafi Vazeh inside the cemetery
- Interactive map of Pantheon of prominent Azerbaijanis
- Location: National Botanical Garden of Georgia, Tbilisi, Georgia
- Coordinates: 41°41′01″N 44°47′58″E
- Type: Memorial cemetery

Pantheon of prominent Azerbaijanis (Azerbaijani: Görkəmli Azərbaycanlılar panteonu, Georgian: აზერბაიჯანელ მოღვაწეთა პანთეონი) is a memorial cemetery of prominent Azerbaijanis in Tbilisi, Georgia. It's part of the National Botanical Garden of Georgia. Notable Azerbaijanis buried here include Mirza Fatali Akhundov, Fatali Khan Khoyski, Mirza Shafi Vazeh, Hasan bey Aghayev, Mammad Hasan Hajinski, Mehdigulu Khan Vafa and others.

== History ==
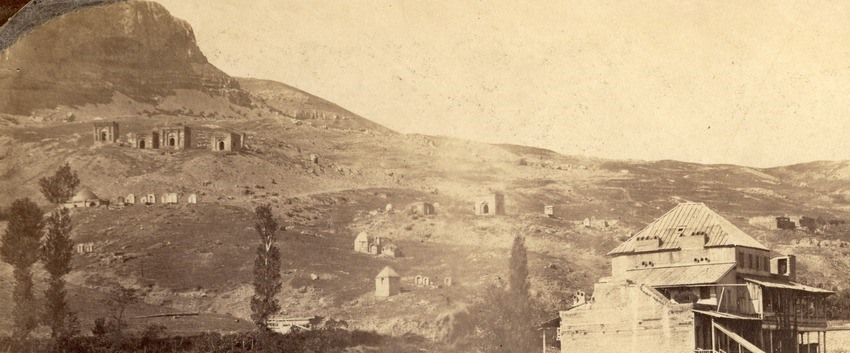
The Muslim cemetery in the hills (1858)

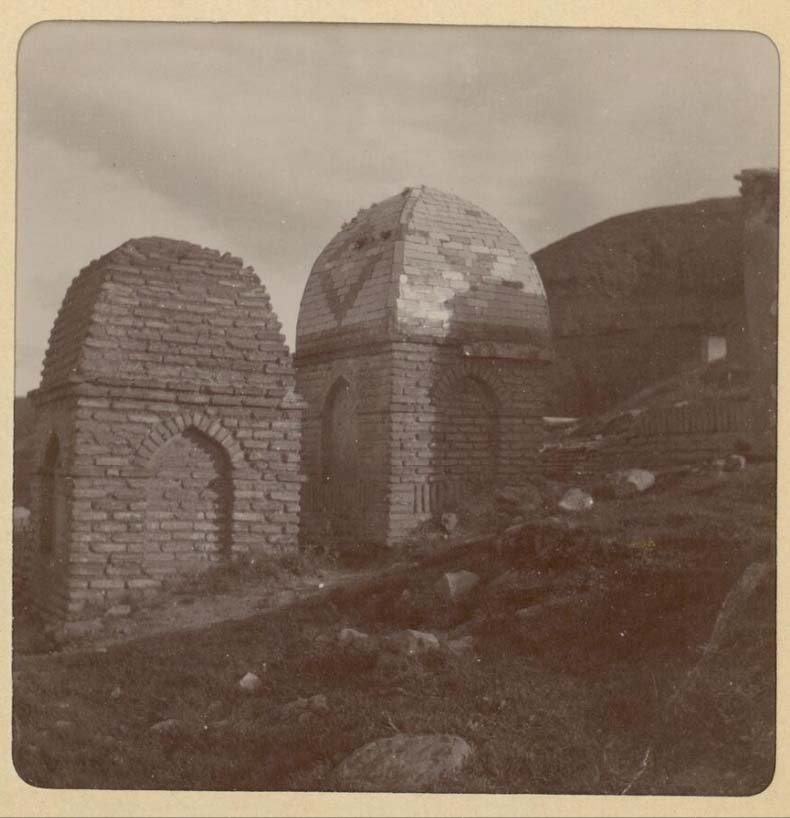
Close up of a Muslim grave

The cemetery was founded in 17th century and was known as Gorkhana (Persian for mausoleum) at the time of its creation. All the Muslims of Tbilisi at the time, mainly Azerbaijanis (Tatars), but also Arabs and Persians, were buried in this cemetery.

In the 1950s, the cemetery was demolished by Soviet authorities. Azerbaijani professor Vagif Arzumanly visited the site in 1959 and found the half-destroyed grave of Mirza Shafi Vazeh, as well as multiple graves of children. In 1964–1965, the relatives of the people buried in the cemetery were informed that a botanical garden was to be built in location of the former cemetery. After this, Arzumanly visited the site again with Georgian professor Ivan Yenikolopov. They found and took pictures of around 100 graves. Only a handful of graves of well-known Azerbaijanis have survived, with the oldest one belonging to Mirza Shafi Vazeh, who died in 1852.

In 1996, the grave of Mirza Fatali Akhundov was laid to rest in the cemetery. The event was attended by Azerbaijani president Heydar Aliyev in his first diplomatic trip to Georgia.

The graves of Mirza Shafi Vazeh, Mirza Fatali Akhundov, Hasan bay Aghayev and Fatali Khan Khoyski were reconstructed by the Heydar Aliyev Foundation in 2006.
