= Peine =

Town in Peine district, Lower Saxony, Germany

- Town
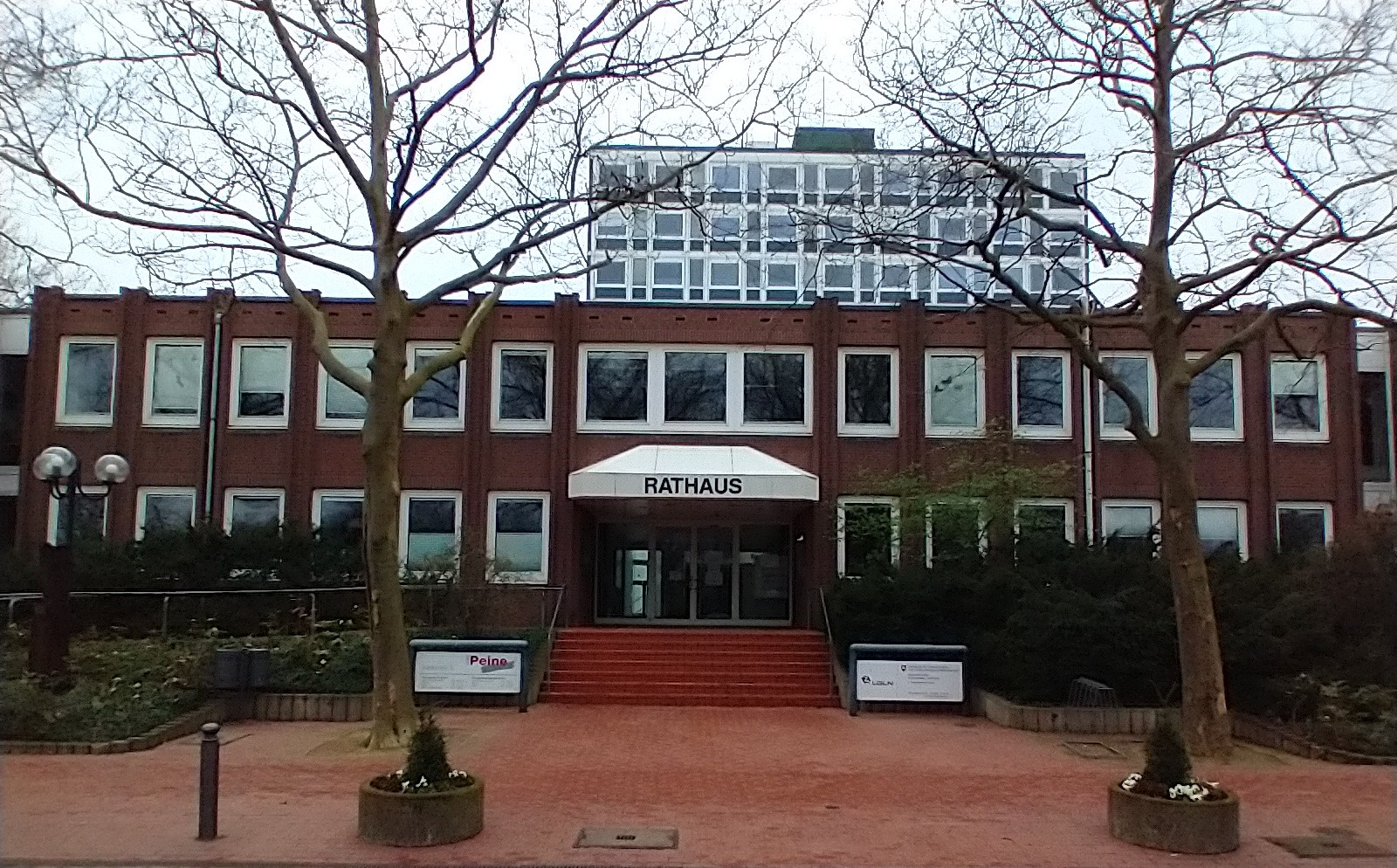
- Town hall of Peine

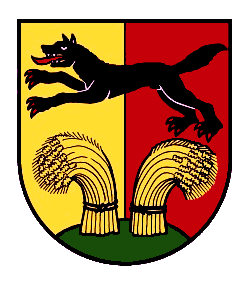
- Flag Coat of arms

- Location of Peine within Peine district
- Interactive map of Peine
- Location within Germany Location within Lower Saxony
- Coordinates: 52°19′13″N 10°14′01″E
- Country: Germany
- State: Lower Saxony
- District: Peine

Government
  - Mayor (2021–26): Klaus Saemann (SPD)

Area
  - Total: 119.84 km^{2} (46.27 sq mi)
- Elevation: 68 m (223 ft)

Population (2025-12-31)
  - Total: 51,005
  - Density: 425.61/km^{2} (1,102.3/sq mi)
- Time zone: UTC+01:00 (CET)
  - Summer (DST): UTC+02:00 (CEST)
- Postal codes: 31224–31228
- Dialling codes: 05171
- Vehicle registration: PE
- Website: www.peine.de

Peine (German pronunciation: [ˈpaɪnə]; Eastphalian: Paane) is a town in Lower Saxony, Germany, capital of the district Peine. It is situated on the river Fuhse and the Mittellandkanal, approximately 25 km (16 mi) west of Braunschweig, 27 km (17 mi) northeast of Hildesheim, and 40 km (25 mi) east of Hanover.

== History ==
Average precipitation values from Peine, 1961–1990

A deed from 1130 mentions Berthold von Pagin, ministerialis of Lothair III, emperor of the Holy Roman Empire, who gave his name to the town in the form of Peine. The Peine Castle, which no longer exists, dated to this era or before.

The 1201 Hildesheim Chronicle describes a feud between the bishop Hartbert von Hildesheim and the brothers Ekbert and Gunzelin von Wolfenbüttel. Earl Gunzelin von Wolfenbüttel was the commander-in-chief of the German army and seneschal in attendance of Otto IV, emperor of the Holy Roman Empire. Gunzelin prevailed and won control of Burg Peine and the surrounding area. South of the castle, Gunzelin founded the town of Peine in 1218 or 1220. In 1223, the settlement gained town privileges. Gunzelin's coat of arms has been the town's symbol ever since.

In 1256, Peine was conquered by Duke Albrecht of Braunschweig-Lüneburg, and after Gunzelin's death in 1260, his sons (see: House of Asseburg) lost the fief of Peine to the bishop of Hildesheim. Otto I of Braunschweig-Lüneburg, bishop of Hildesheim, 1260–1279, gave Earl Wedekind von Poppenburg the castle, town and county of Peine as a fief. Otto later incorporated Peine as a market town.

Also in 1260, Peine earned the right to mint and issue coins and was, with a few interruptions, a mint for the Bishopric of Hildesheim until 1428.

After the imminent shelling of Peine by American tank troops shortly before the end of World War II, the cultural functionary and teacher Hans Michael Finger, mayor Wiard Bronleewe and others from the Peine command post went to surrender to the American commander Captain Daniel A. Grundmann in Rosenthal on the morning of April 10, 1945. Finger was acting as an interpreter. Thanks to Finger's explanations, the further bombardment of Peine was averted almost at the last minute.

In 1954 and 1956, two of the largest German medieval treasures of silver (95 pieces of round bullion, weighing 7.5 kg, dating from the 14th century) were found under the streets Stederdorfer Straße and Horstweg. The Peine city archive was directed by Michael Utecht from 1988 to 2019.

== Subdivisions ==
- Berkum
- Dungelbeck
- Duttenstedt
- Essinghausen
- Handorf
- Peine city centre
- Röhrse
- Rosenthal
- Schmedenstedt
- Schwicheldt
- Stederdorf
- Vöhrum/Eixe/Landwehr
  - Eixe
  - Landwehr
  - Vöhrum
- Wendesse
- Woltorf

== Twin towns – sister cities ==
Peine is twinned with:

- Heywood, England, United Kingdom (1967)
- Aschersleben, Germany (1990)
- Tripoli, Greece (2000)

== Notable people ==
- Friedrich von Bodenstedt (1819–1892), writer
- Rudolf Otto (1869–1937), Lutheran theologian, philosopher and comparative religionist
- Fritz Hartjenstein (1905–1954), SS functionary
- Solomon Perel (1925–2023), Israeli author
- Hans-Hermann Hoppe (born 1949), paleolibertarian and anarcho-capitalist political theorist
- Caren Miosga (born 1969), journalist and television presenter
- Arno Merk (born 1992), darts player

== Gallery ==
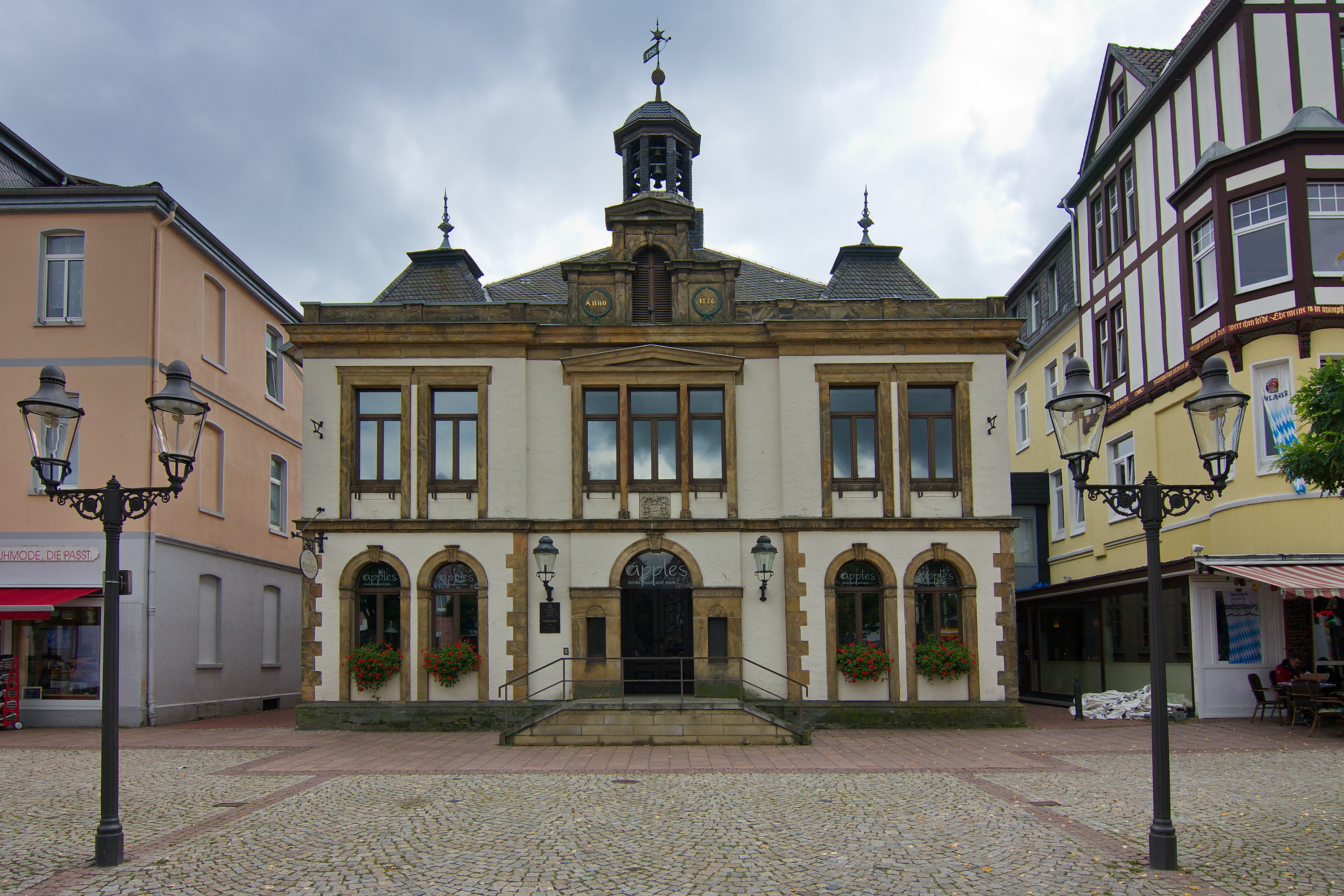
Former town hall from 1827 on the market square

The Burgpark

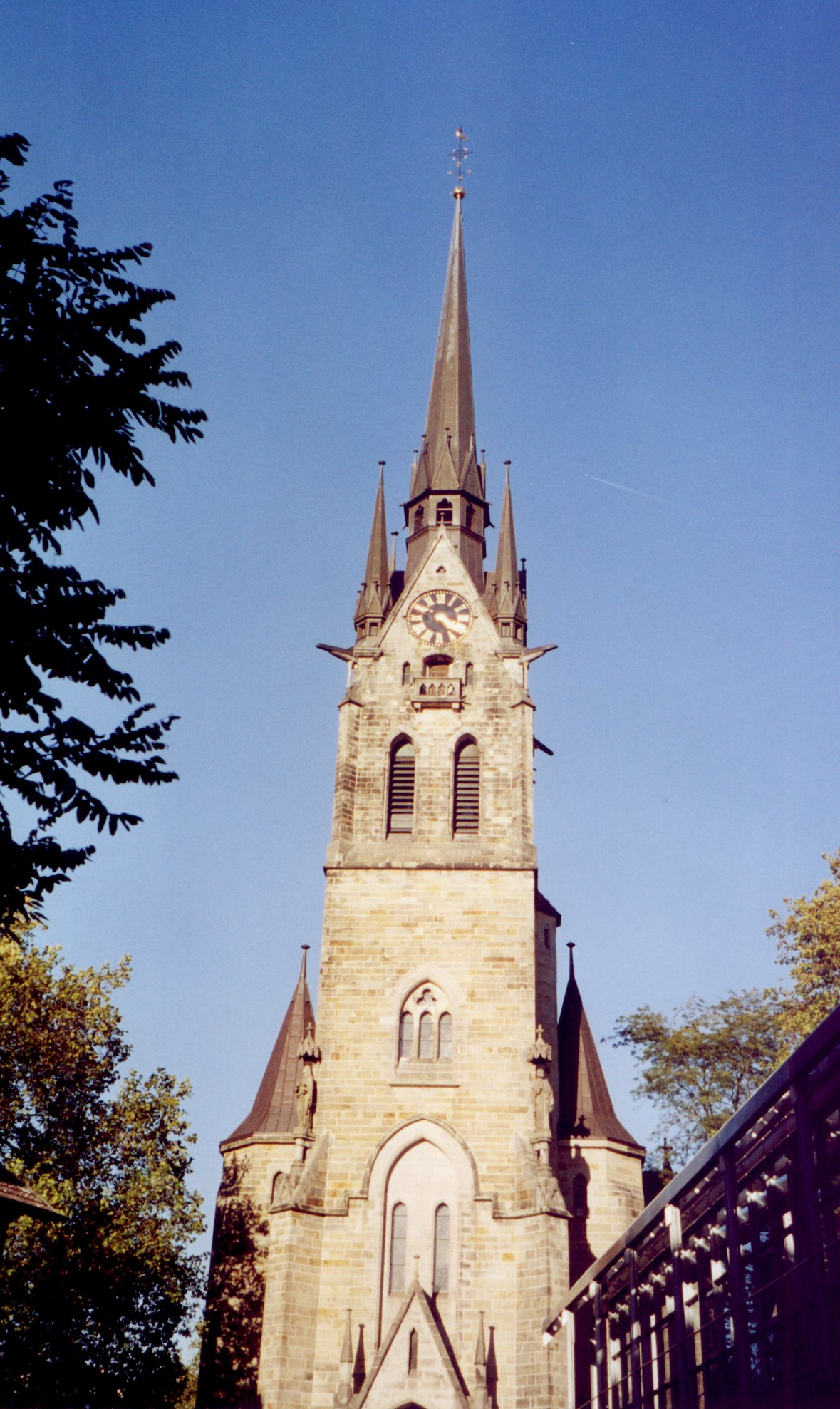
Jakobi-Kirche

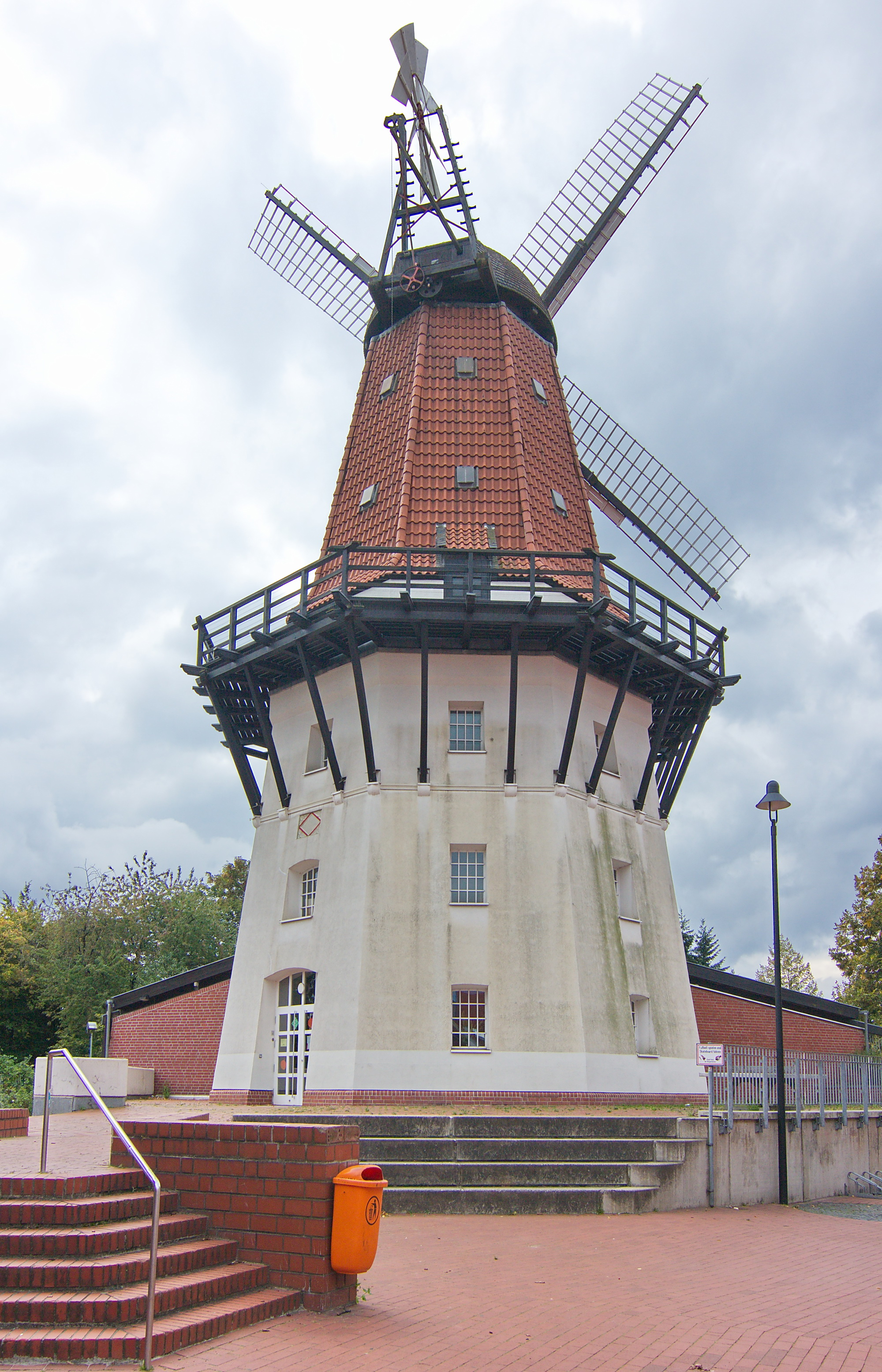
Töpfers Mühle

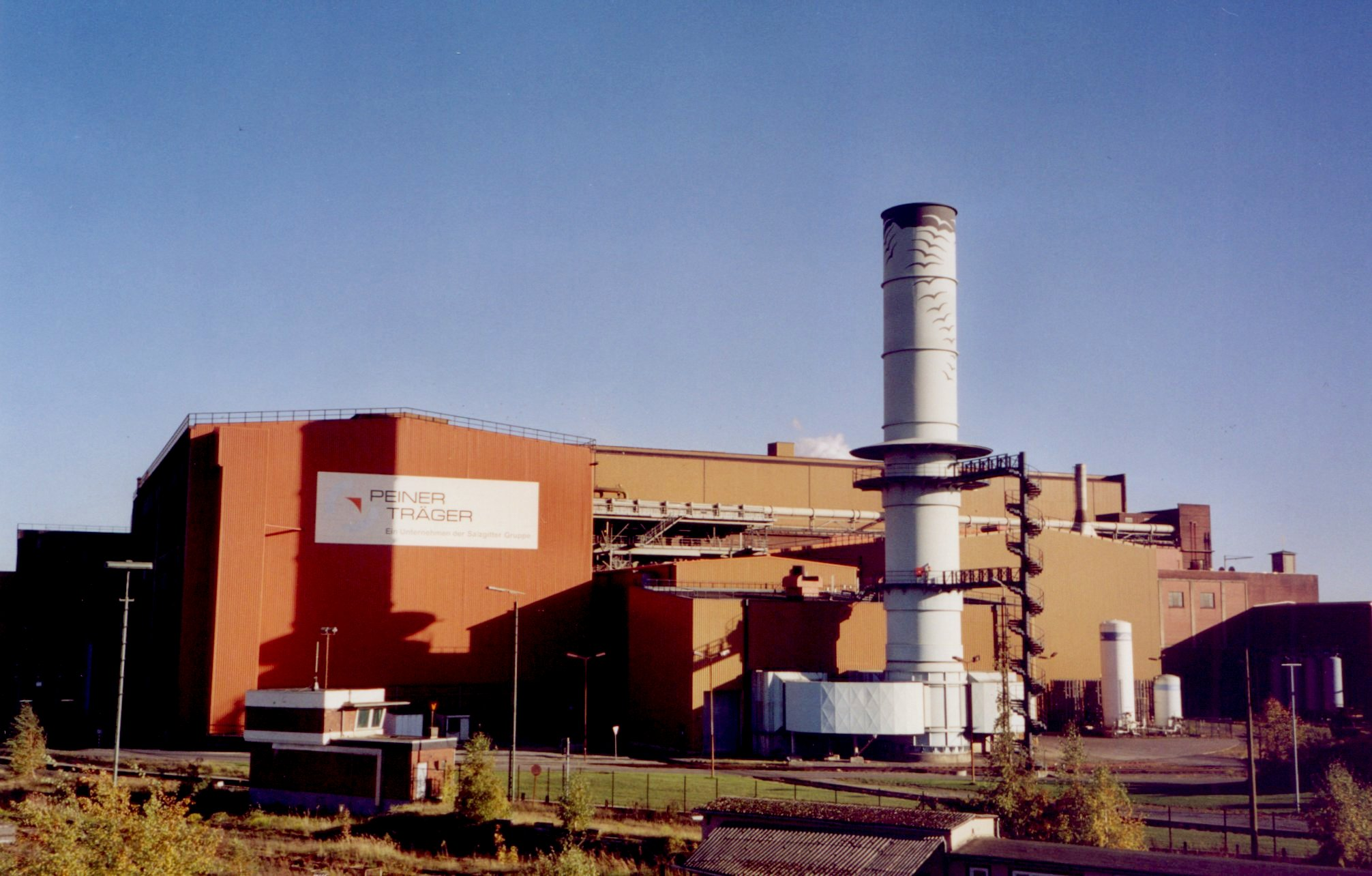
Steel Factory

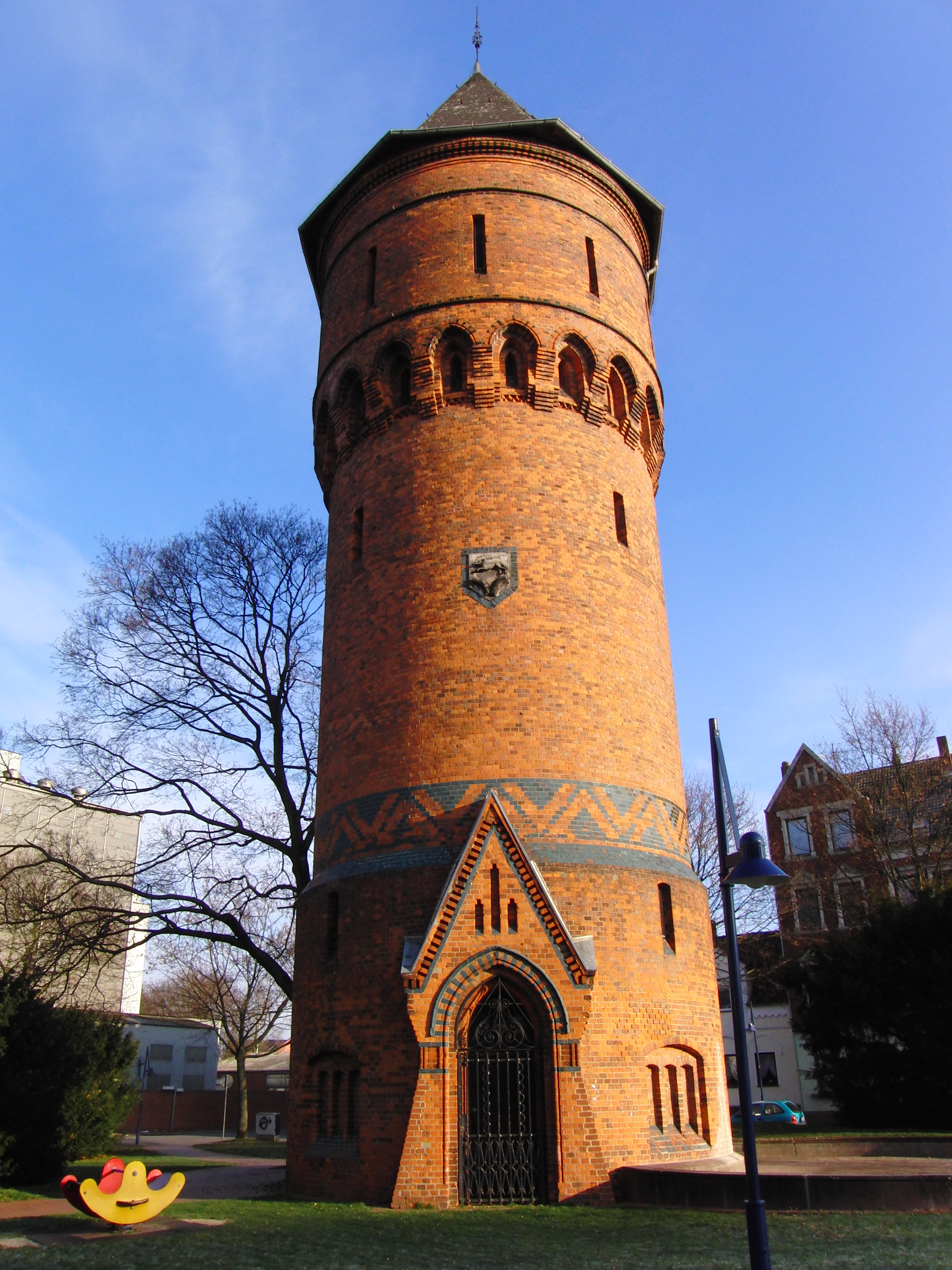
Water Tower in southern Peine

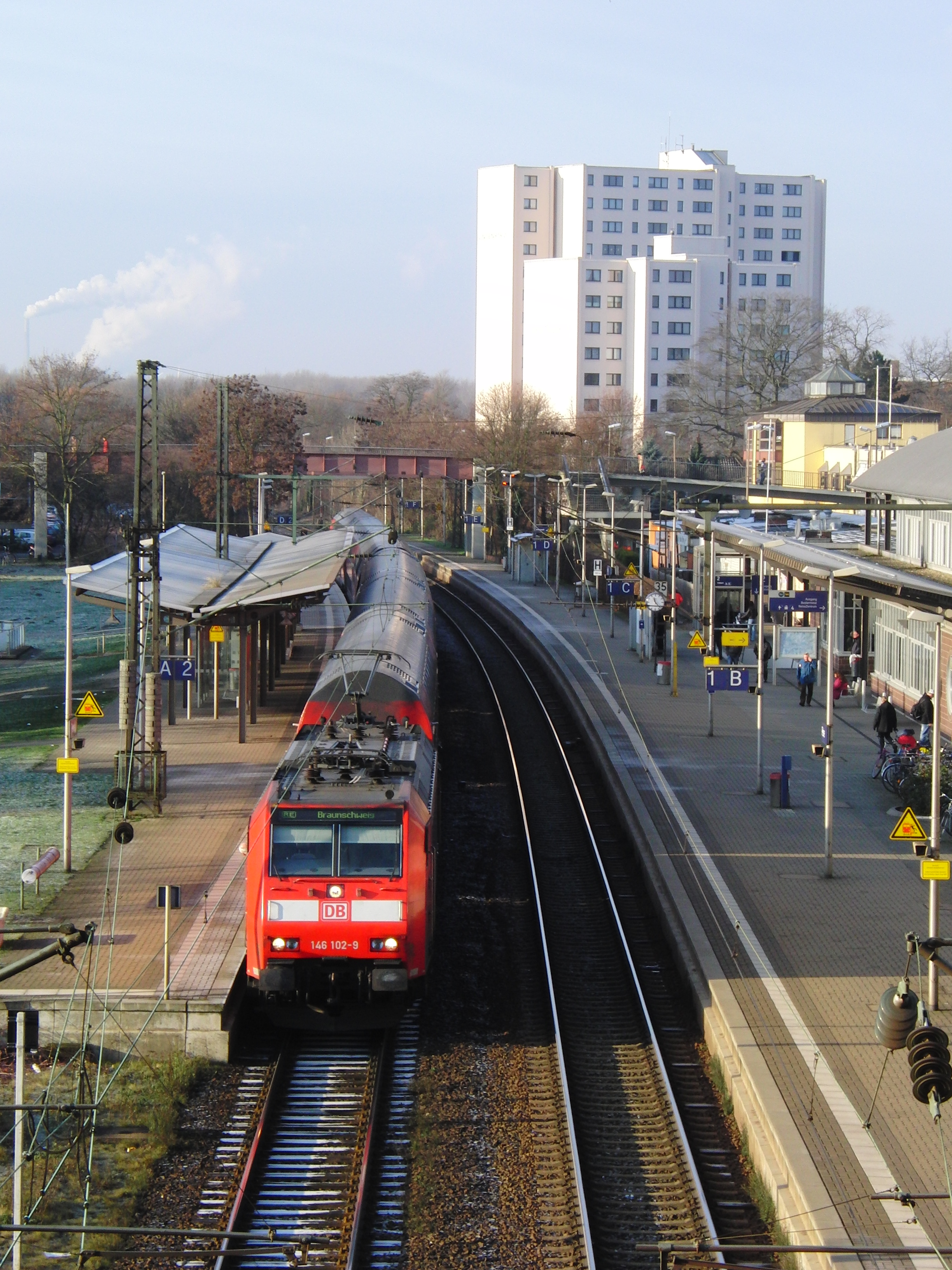
Railway station

== See also ==
- Hannover–Braunschweig–Göttingen–Wolfsburg Metropolitan Region
