= Friedrich von Bodenstedt =

German author (1819–1892)

Friedrich Martin von Bodenstedt
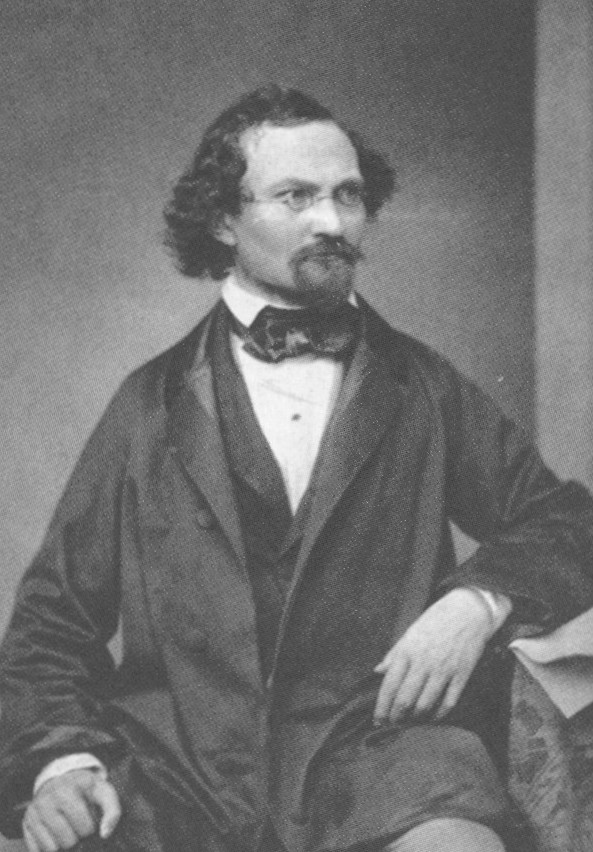
- Friedrich von Bodenstedt, c. 1860
- Born: 22 April 1819; Peine, Kingdom of Hanover
- Died: 19 April 1892 (aged 72)
- Occupation: Author

Friedrich Martin von Bodenstedt (22 April 1819 – 19 April 1892) was a German author.

== Biography ==
Bodenstedt was born in Peine in the Kingdom of Hanover. He was trained as a merchant in Braunschweig and studied in Göttingen, Munich and Berlin.

== Russia ==
His career was determined by his engagement in 1841 as tutor in the family of Prince Gallitzin at Moscow, where he gained a thorough knowledge of Russian. This led to his appointment in 1844 as the head of a public school at Tiflis, Governorate of Tiflis (present-day Georgia).

== Persian studies ==
He took the opportunity of his proximity to Persia to study Persian literature and translate and publish in 1851 a volume of poetry under the fanciful title Die Lieder des Mirza Schaffy (English trans. by Elsa d'Esterre-Keeling 1880). The success of this work can only be compared with that of Edward FitzGerald's Omar Khayyám, produced in somewhat similar circumstances, but differed from it in being immediate. It has gone through 160 editions in Germany, and has been translated into almost all literary languages. The celebrity is not undeserved, for although Bodenstedt does not attain the poetical elevation of FitzGerald, his translation conveys a view of life which is wider, more cheerful and more sane, while the execution is a model of grace.

Though he claimed that the volume was his own poetry published under oriental disguise to gain popularity, it has been argued that the volume was a successful translation of the Persian and Azerbaijani poems of an Azerbaijani poet, and a known acquaintance of his, Mirza Shafi Vazeh.

== Return to Germany ==
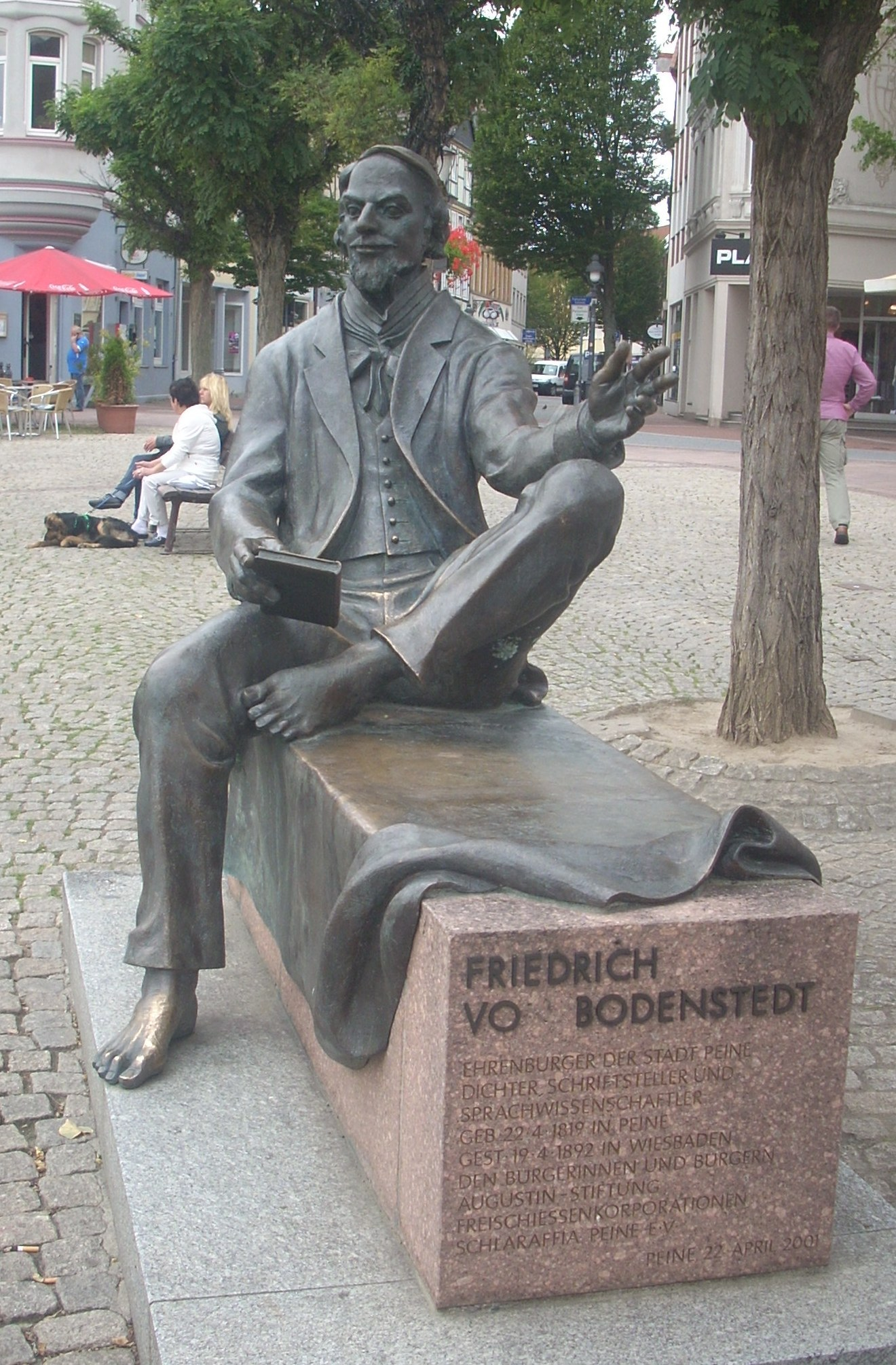
Statue of von Bodenstedt in Peine

On his return from the East, Bodenstedt engaged for a while in journalism, married the daughter of a Hessian officer (Matilde, the Edlitam of his poems), and was in 1854 appointed professor of Slavonic at Munich. The rich stores of knowledge which Bodenstedt brought back from the East were turned to account in two important books, Die Völker des Kaukasus und ihre Freiheits-Kämpfe gegen die Russen (1848), and Tausend und ein Tag im Orient (1850).

== Slavonic studies ==
For some time Bodenstedt continued to devote himself to Slavonic subjects, producing translations of Pushkin, Lermontov, Turgenev, and of the poets of Ukraine, and writing a tragedy on the false Demetrius, and an epic, Ada die Lesghierin, on a Circassian theme. Likely finding this vein exhausted, he exchanged his professorship in 1858 for one of Early English literature and published in 1858–1860 a valuable work on the English dramatists contemporary with Shakespeare, with copious translations. In 1862 he produced a standard translation of Shakespeare's sonnets, and between 1866 and 1872 published a complete version of the plays, with the help of many coadjutors.

== Theatre ==
In 1867 he undertook the direction of the court theatre at Meiningen and was ennobled by the duke. After 1873 he lived successively at Altona, Berlin and Wiesbaden, where he died on April 19, 1892. His later works consist of an autobiography (1888), successful translations from Hafiz and Omar Khayyam, and lyrics and dramas which added little to his reputation.

== American tour ==
From 1879 to 1880 Bodenstedt traveled through the United States. He published his travel account in 1882 in Leipzig, entitled Vom Atlantischen zum Stillen Ozean (From the Atlantic to the Pacific).

An edition of his collected works in 12 vols. was published in Berlin (1866–1869), and his Erzählungen und Romane at Jena (1871–1872).

== Works ==
(All links are German)

- Die Völker des Kaukasus und ihre Freiheitskämpfe gegen die Russen (1849) (The People of the Caucasus and their Struggle Against the Russians)
- Ada, die Lesghierin: Ein Gedicht (1853) (Ada the Lezgian: A Poem)
- Shakespeare's zeitgenossen und ihre werke; in charakteristiken und übersetzungen (1858) (Shakespeare's contemporaries and their works)
- Duftkörner aus persischen Dichtern gesammelt (1860) (Gems collected from Persian poets)
- Collected Works (1865): Vol. 1-2, Vol. 3-4, Vol. 5-6, Vol. 7-8, Vol. 9-10, Vol. 11-12
- Die Lieder des Mirza-Schaffy (1875) (The Songs of Mirza Shafi)
- Aus dem Nachlasse Mirza Schaffy's (From the Accounts of Mirza Shafi)
- Die Lieder und Sprüche des Omar Chajjam (1881) (Omar Khayam)
- Vom Atlantischen zum Stillen Ocean (1882) (From the Atlantic to the Pacific)
- Aus Morgenland und Abendland, neue Gedichte und Sprüche (1884) (From East and West, New Poems and Proverbs)
- Erinnerungen aus meinem Leben (1890) (Memories from My Life)
