= Goygol =

Goygol, Göygöl, or Goygöl may refer to:

== Places in Azerbaijan ==
- Goygol District
  - Goygol (city)
- Göygöl (lake)
  - Göygöl National Park
  - Göygöl (Ganja)

== Other uses ==
- "Goygol", a poem by AzerbaijanI poet Ahmad Javad
