= Ganja Mall =

Shopping mall in Ganja, Azerbaijan

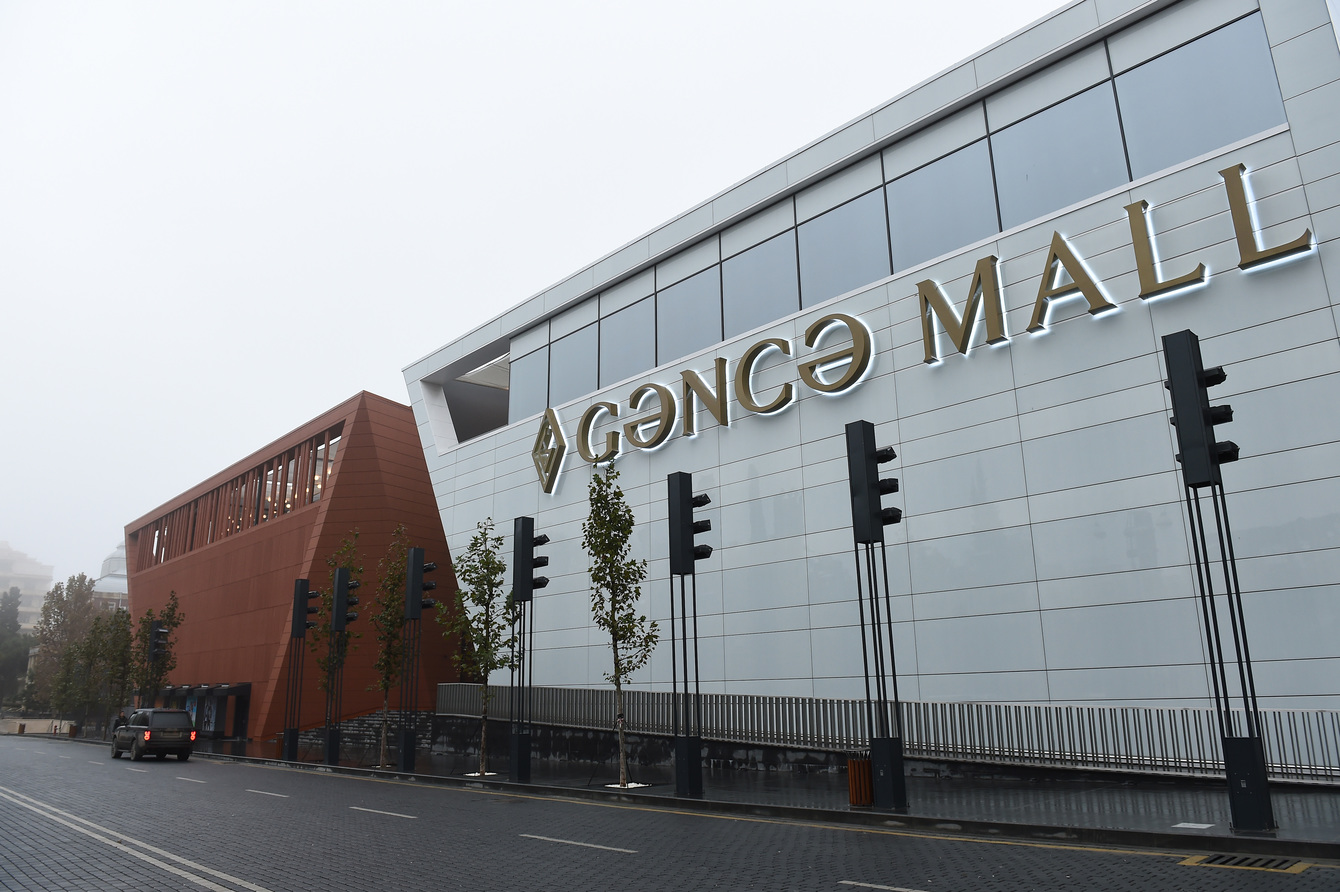

Ganja Mall is a shopping mall located in Ganja, and it's the largest mall in the city. It was opened on October 10, 2017.
