= Trolleybuses in Ganja, Azerbaijan =

Ganja trolleybus system

Operation
- Locale: Ganja, Azerbaijan
- Open: 1 May 1955
- Close: 2004
- Status: Closed
- Lines: 8 (max)

Statistics
- Route length: 112.9 km (70.2 mi) (max)

The Ganja trolleybus system was a system of trolleybuses forming part of the public transport arrangements in Ganja, the second most populous city in Azerbaijan, for most of the second half of the 20th century.

== History ==
The system was opened on 1 May 1955. At its height, it consisted of eight lines, and had a total length of 112.9 km (70.2 mi). It was closed in 2004.

== Services ==
During the final stages of the system's operation, only route 7 was still served by trolleybuses, during the rush hour peak period.

== Fleet ==
The Ganja trolleybus fleet in the period leading up to the system's closure was made up of 9 vehicles of types Škoda 9Tr and ZiU-682.

Previously, the system had used trolleybus vehicles of the following types:

- MTB-82
- Škoda 14Tr
- ZiU-5
- ZiU-9

== See also ==
- History of Ganja, Azerbaijan
- List of trolleybus systems
- Trams in Ganja, Azerbaijan
- Trolleybuses in former Soviet Union countries
