= Ganja, Azerbaijan =

Ganja Gəncə
- City
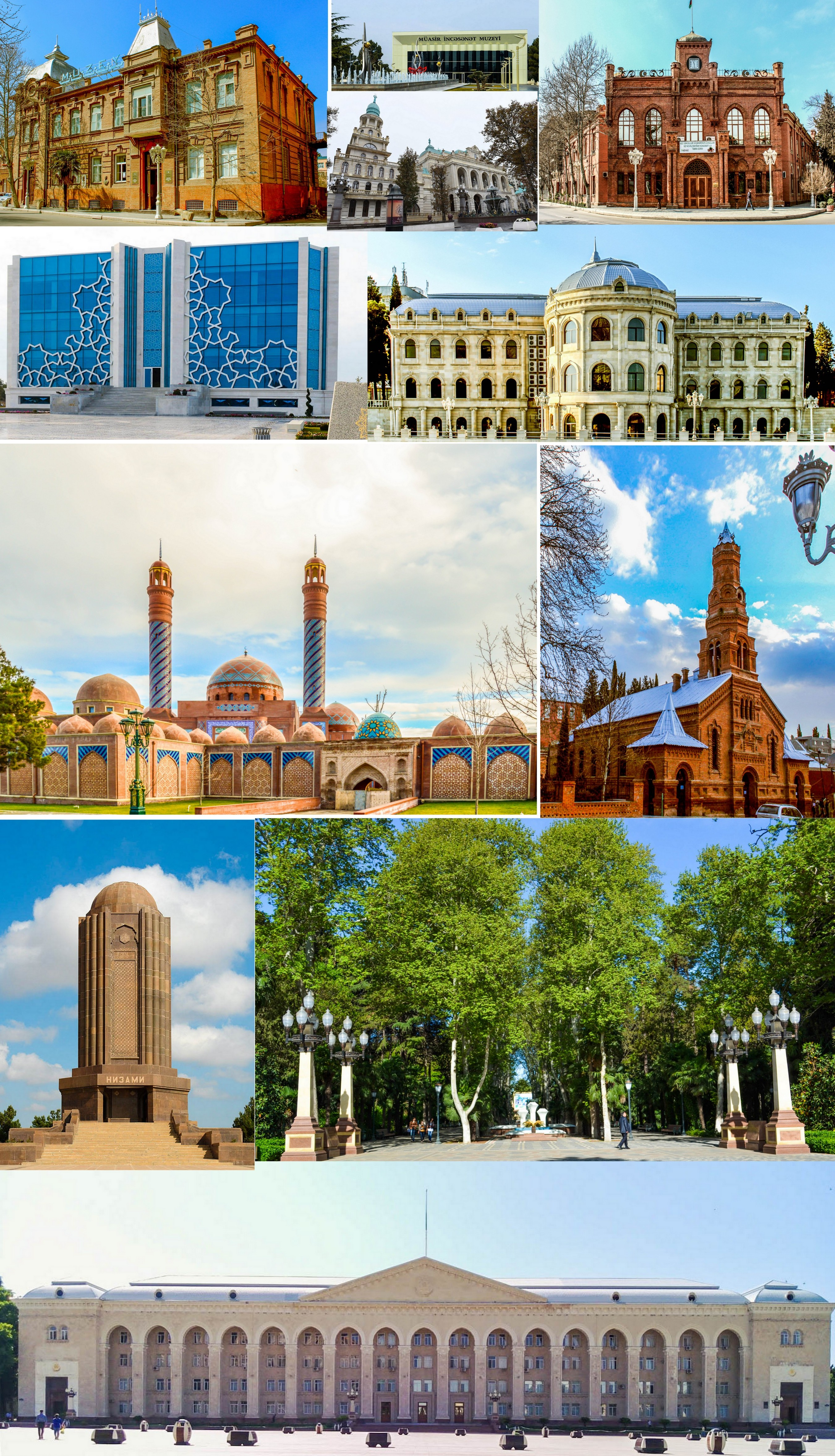

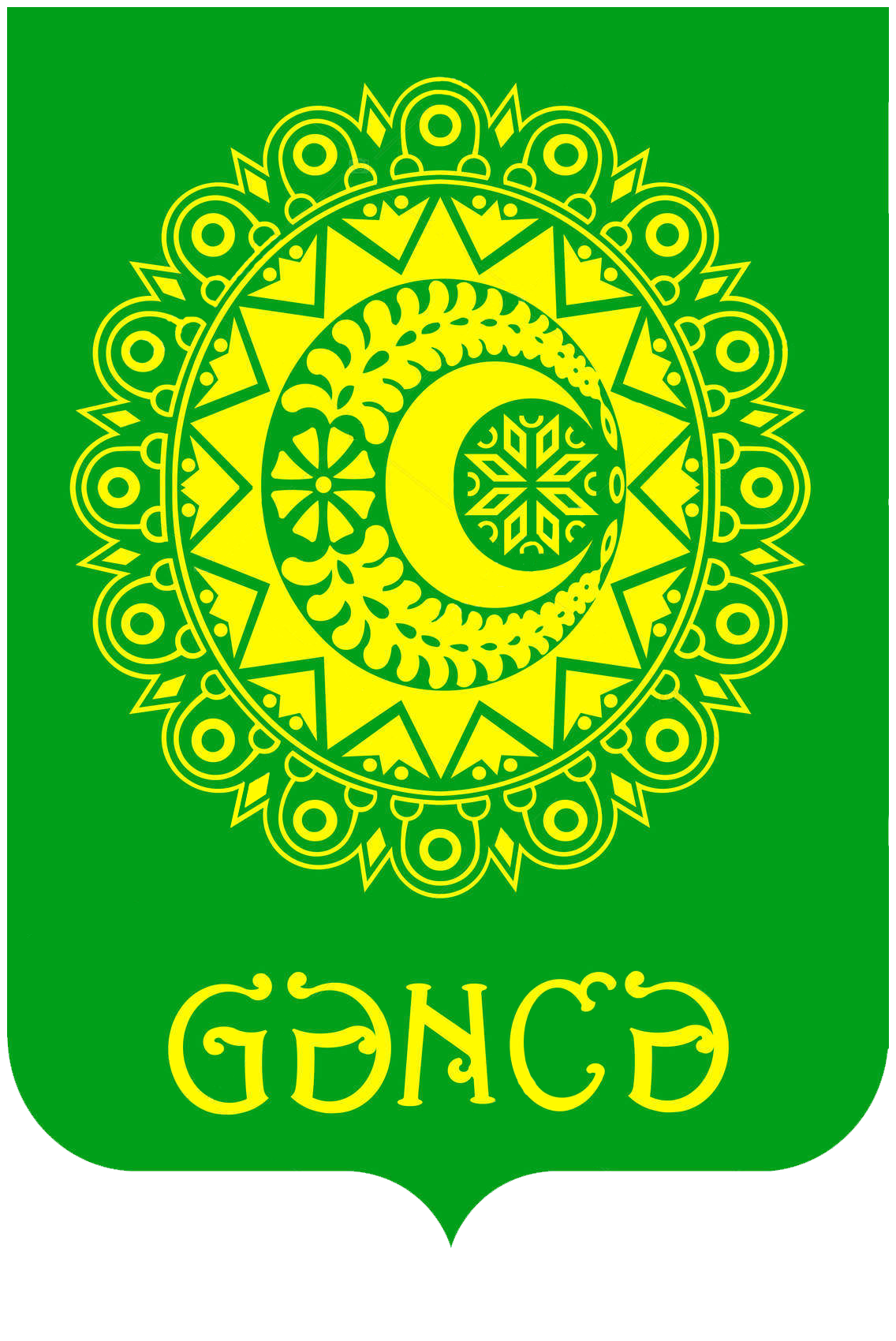
- Seal
- Nickname: Qırmızı Şəhər (Red City)
- Ganja in Azerbaijan
- Interactive map of Ganja
- Coordinates: 40°40′58″N 46°21′38″E
- Country: Azerbaijan
- Region: Ganja-Dashkasan
- Established: 660

Government
  - Mayor: Niyazi Bayramov

Area
  - Total: 110 km^{2} (42 sq mi)
- Elevation: 408 m (1,339 ft)

Population (2024)
  - Total: 330,663
  - Density: 3,000/km^{2} (7,800/sq mi)
  - Population Rank in Azerbaijan: 3rd
- Demonym: Ganjaly (Gəncəli)
- Time zone: UTC+4 (AZT)
- Postal code: 2000
- Vehicle registration: 20 AZ
- Website: ganja-ih.gov.az

Ganja (/ˈɡændʒə/; Azerbaijani: Gəncə [ɟænˈdʒæ]) is Azerbaijan's third largest city, with a population of around 335,600. The city has been a historic and cultural center throughout most of its existence. It was the capital of the Ganja Khanate until 1804; after Qajar Iran ceded it and most other Iranian territories in the Caucasus to the Russian Empire following the Treaty of Gulistan in 1813, it became part of the administrative divisions of the Georgia Governorate, Georgia-Imeretia Governorate, Tiflis Governorate, and Elizavetpol Governorate. Following the dissolution of the Russian Empire and the Transcaucasian Democratic Federative Republic, it became a part of the Azerbaijan Democratic Republic, followed by the Azerbaijan SSR, and, since 1991, the Republic of Azerbaijan.

== Etymology ==
The name Ganja derives from the Persian word ganj (Middle Persian: ganj), meaning "treasure" or "treasury". It was called Janza in Arabic sources and Gandzak in Armenian sources. The explanation that the city was named this after its founder discovered treasure nearby (see below) is considered a folk etymology. According to one view, the city may have been named after Ganzak, the pre-Muslim capital of Adurbadagan. The city was renamed Yelizavetpol (Russian: Елизаветпо́ль, romanized: Yelizavetpól', IPA: [jɪlʲɪzəvʲɪtˈpolʲ]) in 1813, when it was part of the Russian Empire. After its incorporation into the Soviet Union, it was initially renamed back to Ganja (Gyandzha) in 1924, but in 1935 the name was changed again to Kirovabad (Russian: Кироваба́д, romanized: Kirovabád, IPA: [kʲɪrəvɐˈbat]) in honor of the Soviet politician Sergei Kirov, a name which the city retained throughout most of the rest of the Soviet period. In 1989, during perestroika, the city regained its original name of Ganja (Azerbaijani: Gəncə), which is known as Gyandzha (Гянджа, Russian pronunciation: [ɡʲɪnˈdʑa]) in Russian, Gyanja (Գյանջա) or Gandzak (Գանձակ) in Armenian, and Ganjeh (گنجه) in Persian.

== History ==
=== Medieval era ===
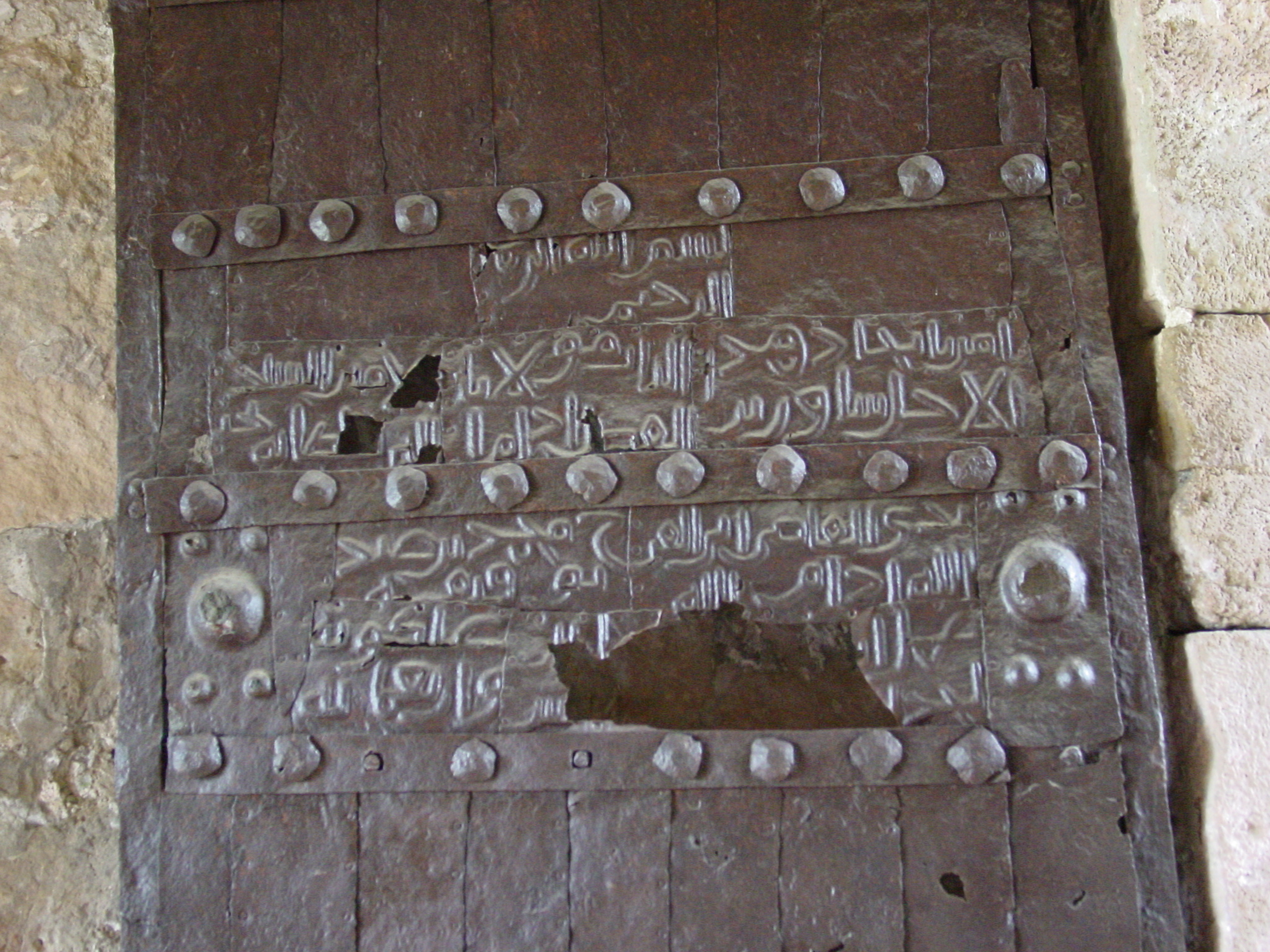
Gate of Ganja, now in Gelati Monastery, Imereti, Georgia

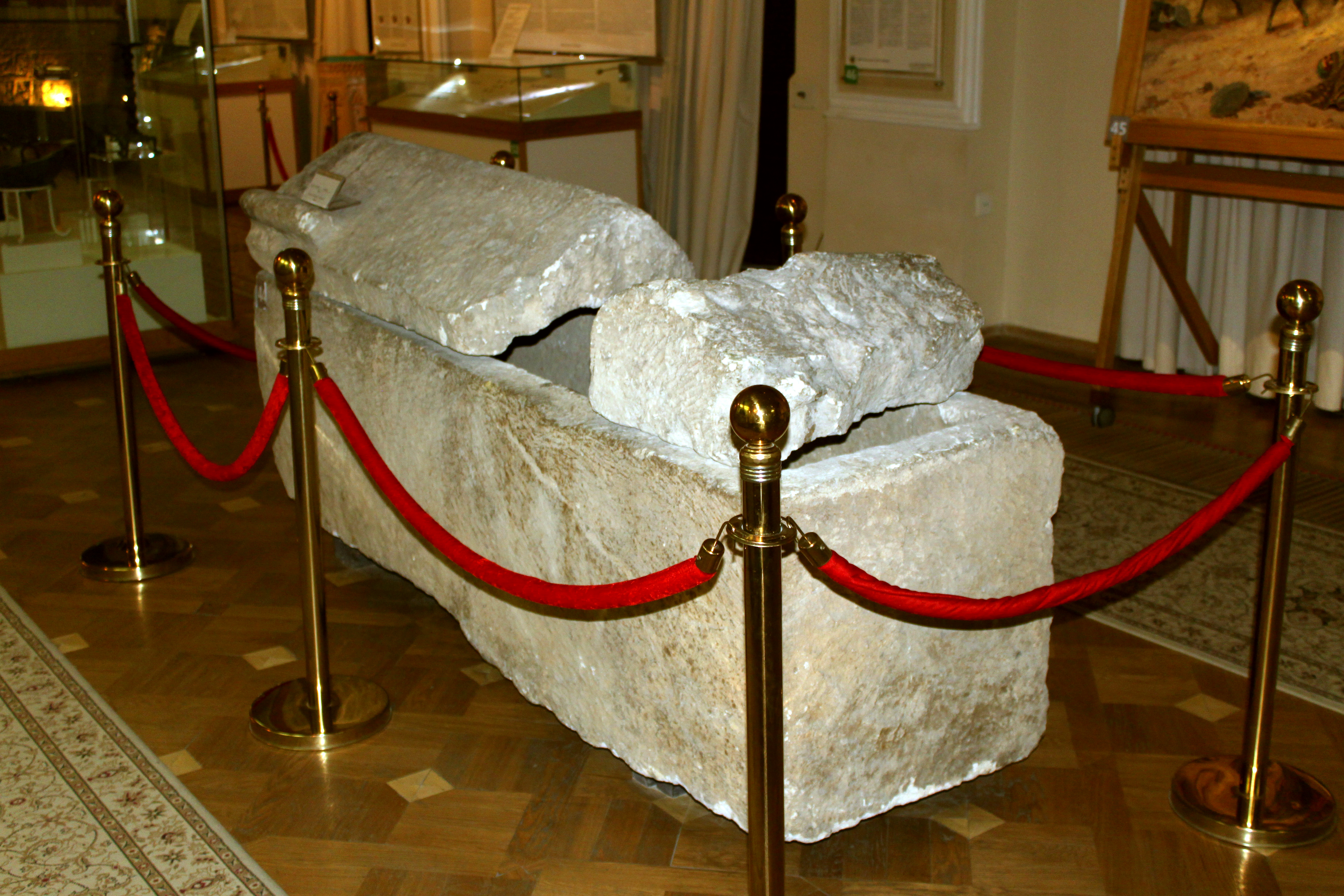
Ancient Ganja's necropolises and burial mounds

According to the anonymous medieval Arabic history Tarikh Bab al-abwab, the city of Ganja was founded in 859–60 by Muhammad ibn Khalid ibn Yazid ibn Mazyad, the Arab governor of the region during the reign of the caliph Al-Mutawakkil, and so-called because of a treasure unearthed there. According to the legend, the Arab governor had a dream where a voice told him that there was a treasure hidden under one of the three hills around the area where he camped. The voice told him to unearth it and use the money to found a city. He did so and informed the caliph about the money and the city. The caliph made Muhammad the hereditary governor of the city on the condition that he would give the money he found to the caliph. The foundation of the city by the Arabs in the 9th century is supported by the medieval Armenian historian Movses Kaghankatvatsi, who mentions that the city of Ganja was founded in 846–47 in the canton of Arshakashen by "Mahmed son of Xałtʿ" (i.e., Muhammad ibn Khalid). The 14th-century Persian historian Hamdallah Mustawfi instead claims that the city was founded in 659–60, when the Arab armies first arrived in the South Caucasus.

However, the Persian origin of Ganja's name suggests that there was an older pre-Islamic town there. According to some sources, it changed hands between Persians, Khazars and Arabs even in the 7th century. The area in which Ganja is located was known as Arran from the 9th to 12th century; its urban population spoke mainly in the Persian language.

Historically an important city of the South Caucasus, Ganja has been part of the Sassanid Empire, Great Seljuk Empire, Kingdom of Georgia, Atabegs of Azerbaijan, Khwarezmid Empire, Il-Khans, Timurids, Qara Qoyunlu, Ak Koyunlu, the Safavid, the Afsharid, the Zand and the Qajar empires of Persia/Iran. Prior to the Iranian Zand and Qajar rule, following Nader Shah's death, it was ruled locally for a few decades by the khans of the Ganja Khanate, who themselves were subordinate to the central rule in mainland Iran and were a branch of the Iranian Qajar family. Ganja is also the birthplace of the famous Persian poet Nizami Ganjavi.

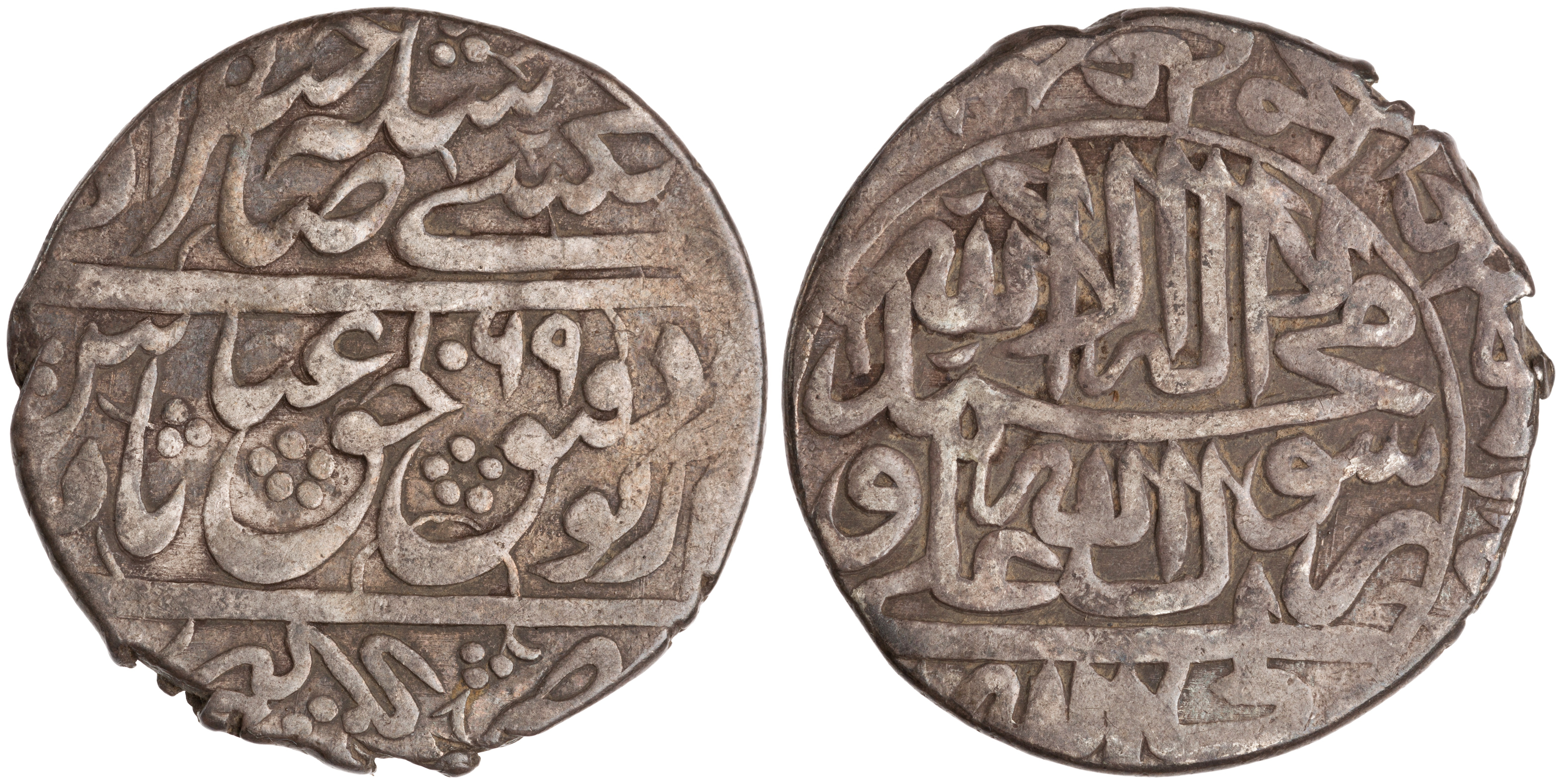
Silver coin of Abbas II (r. 1642–1666), minted in Ganja, dated 1658/9 (left = obverse; right = reverse)

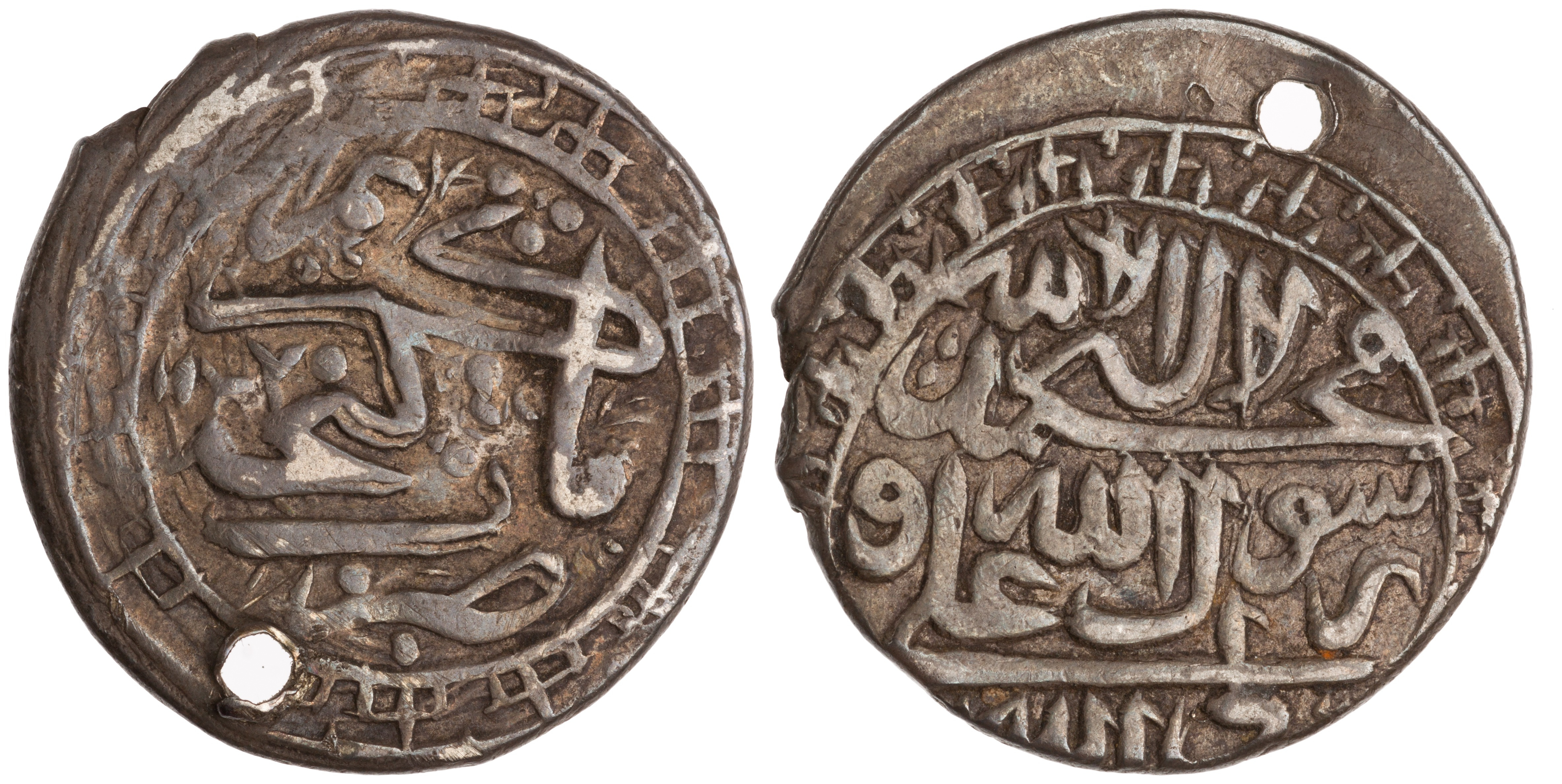
Silver coin of Karim Khan Zand (r. 1751–1779), minted in Ganja, dated 1763/4 (left = obverse; right = reverse)

The people of Ganja experienced a temporary cultural decline after an earthquake in September 1139, when the city was taken by king Demetrius I of Georgia and its gates taken as trophies which is still kept in Georgia, and again after the Mongol invasion in 1231. The city was revived after the Safavids came to power in 1501 and incorporated all of Azerbaijan and beyond into their territories. The city came under brief occupation by the Ottomans between 1578–1606 and 1723–1735 during the prolonged Ottoman-Persian Wars, but nevertheless stayed under intermittent Iranian suzerainty from the earliest 16th century up to the course of the 19th century, when it was forcefully ceded to neighbouring Imperial Russia.

=== 16th–19th centuries and Russian conquest ===
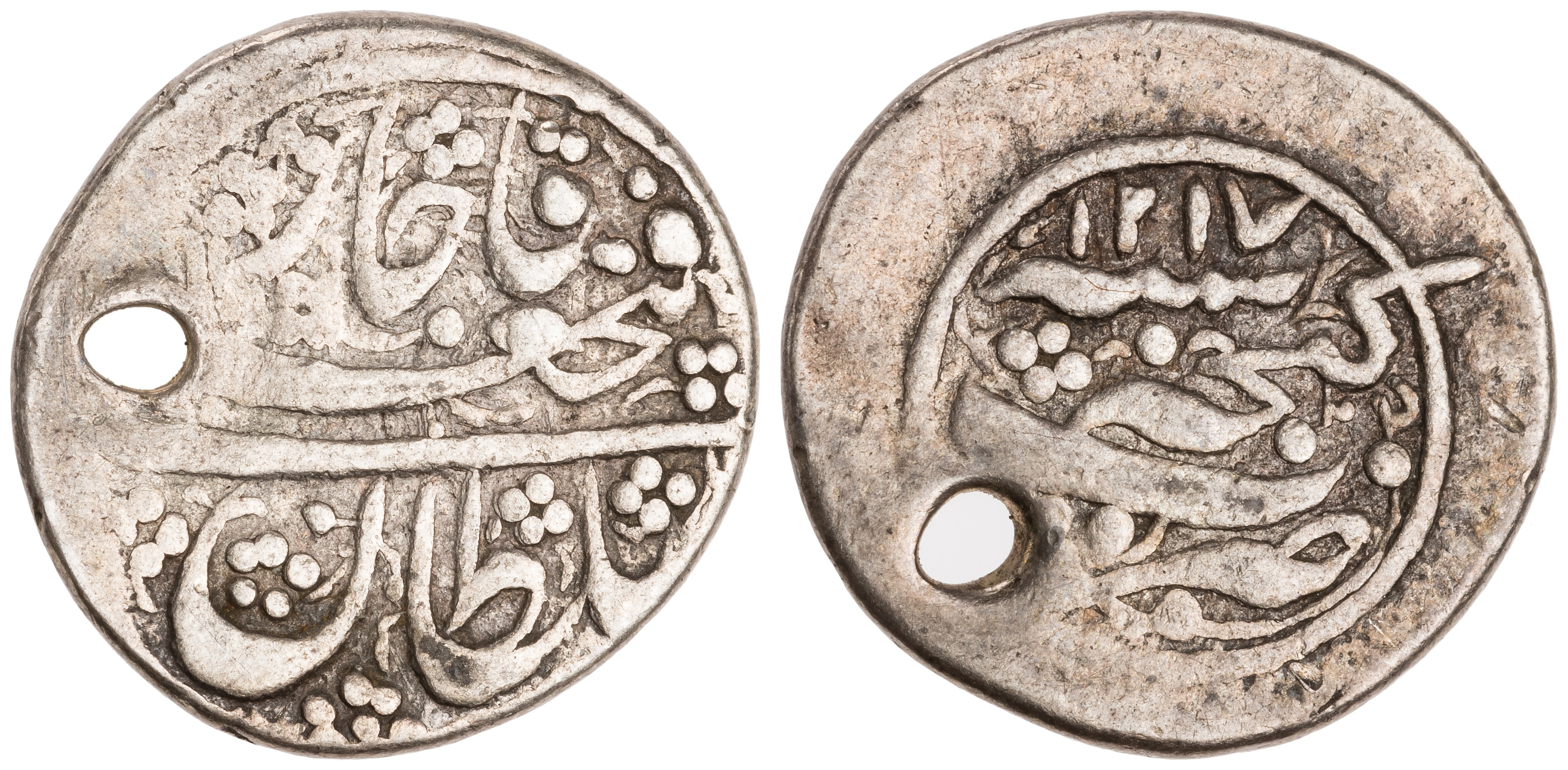
Silver coin of Fath-Ali Shah Qajar (r. 1797–1834), minted in Ganja, dated 1802/3 (left = obverse; right = reverse)

For a short period, Ganja was renamed Abbasabad by Shah Abbas after war against the Ottomans. He built a new city 8 kilometres (5 miles) to the southwest of the old one, but the name changed back to Ganja during the time. During the Safavid rule, it was the capital of the Karabakh province. In 1747, Ganja became the center of the Ganja Khanate for a few decades following the death of Nader Shah, until the advent of the Iranian Zand and Qajar dynasties. The khans/dukes who de facto self-ruled the khanate, were subordinate to the central rule in mainland Iran and were from a branch of the Iranian Qajar family.

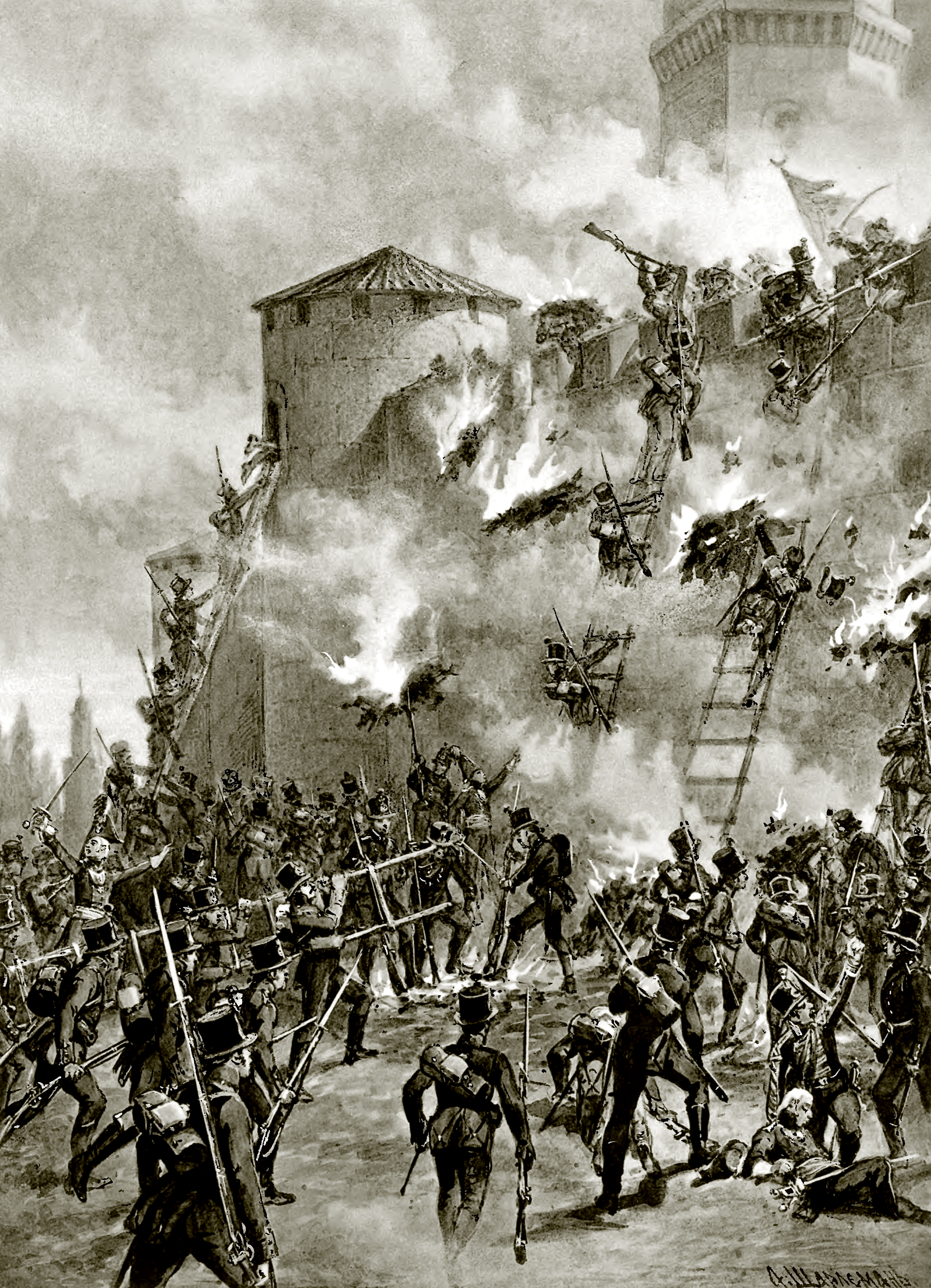
The siege of Ganja Fortress in 1804 during the Russo-Persian War (1804–1813) by the Russian forces under leadership of general Pavel Tsitsianov.

From the late 18th century, Russia actively started to increase its encroachments into Iranian and Turkish territory to the south. Following the annexation of eastern Georgia in 1801, Russia was now keen to conquer the rest of the Iranian possessions in the Caucasus. Russian expansion into the South Caucasus met particularly strong opposition in Ganja. In 1804, the Russians, led by General Pavel Tsitsianov, invaded and sacked Ganja, sparking the Russo-Persian War of 1804–1813. Some western sources assert that "the capture of the city was followed by a massacre of up to 3,000 inhabitants of Ganja by the Russians". They also claim that "500 of them were slaughtered in a mosque where they had taken refuge, after an Armenian apprised the Russians that there might have been 'Daghestani robbers' among them".

With their military superiority, the Russians were victorious in the Russo-Persian War of 1804–1813. By the Treaty of Gulistan that followed, Iran was forced to cede the Ganja Khanate to Russia. The Iranians briefly managed to oust the Russians from Ganja during the 1826 offensive during the Russo-Persian War of 1826–1828, but the resulting Treaty of Turkmenchay made its inclusion into the Russian Empire permanent. It was renamed Yelizavetpol (Елизаветполь) after the wife of Alexander I of Russia, Elizabeth, and in 1840 became the capital of the Elizavetpol uezd and later in 1868, the Elizavetpol Governorate. The Russian name of the city was rejected by the local Azerbaijanis, who continued call it Ganja.

=== 20th century ===
Ganja—known then as Yelizavetpol—was one of the main sites of the Armenian–Tatar massacres of 1905–07. In 1918, Ganja became the temporary capital of the Azerbaijan Democratic Republic, at which point it was renamed Ganja again, until Baku was recaptured from the British-backed Centrocaspian Dictatorship. In April 1920, the Red Army occupied Azerbaijan. In May 1920, Ganja was the scene of an abortive anti-Soviet rebellion, during which the city was heavily damaged by fighting between the insurgents and the Red Army. In 1935, Joseph Stalin renamed the city Kirovabad after Sergei Kirov. In 1991, Azerbaijan re-established its independence, and the ancient name of the city was given back. For many years the 104th Guards Airborne Division of the Soviet Airborne Troops was based in the town.

In November 1988, the Kirovabad pogrom forced the local Armenian population to leave the city.

=== 21st century ===
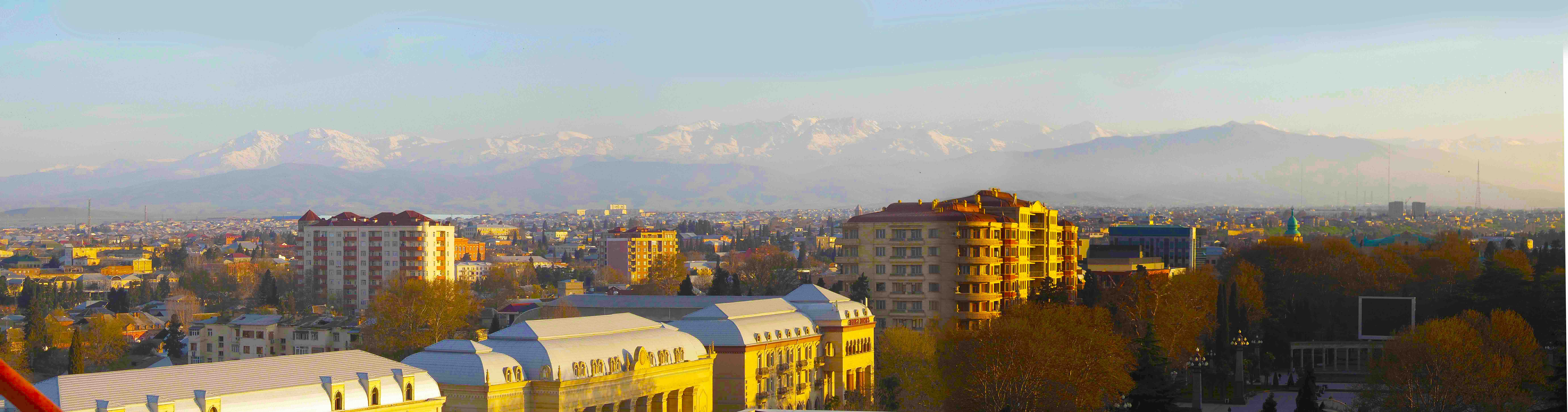
View of the city of Ganja

Reconstruction in the 21st century has led to dramatic changes in the city's urban development, transforming the old Soviet city into a hub of modern high-rise, mixed-use buildings.

In 2008, Ganja Mausoleum Gates were built on the basis of sketches of ancient Ganja gates made by local master Ibrahim Osmanoğlu in 1063.

In 2020, during the Nagorno-Karabakh conflict, Ganja came under bombardment by Armenian armed forces several times, killing 32 civilians and injuring dozens more. On 11 October, a residential apartment block in Azerbaijan's city of Ganja was destroyed overnight in an Armenian missile strike, killing 10 civilians and wounding 34 others. The Armenian MoD denied that this came from its territory, while Artsakh stated that Armenian forces had targeted and destroyed the Ganja military airbase on Ganja International Airport, which they alleged was used to bombard Artsakh's capital Stepanakert and also stated that the Azerbaijani population were given warning to move away from military facilities to avoid collateral damage. Subsequently, both a correspondent reporting from the scene for a Russian media outlet and the airport director denied that the airport, which had not been operational since March due to the COVID-19 pandemic, had been shelled. On 17 October, 21 civilians were killed and more than 50 injured when an Armenian SCUD B ballistic missile hit a residential area in Ganja.

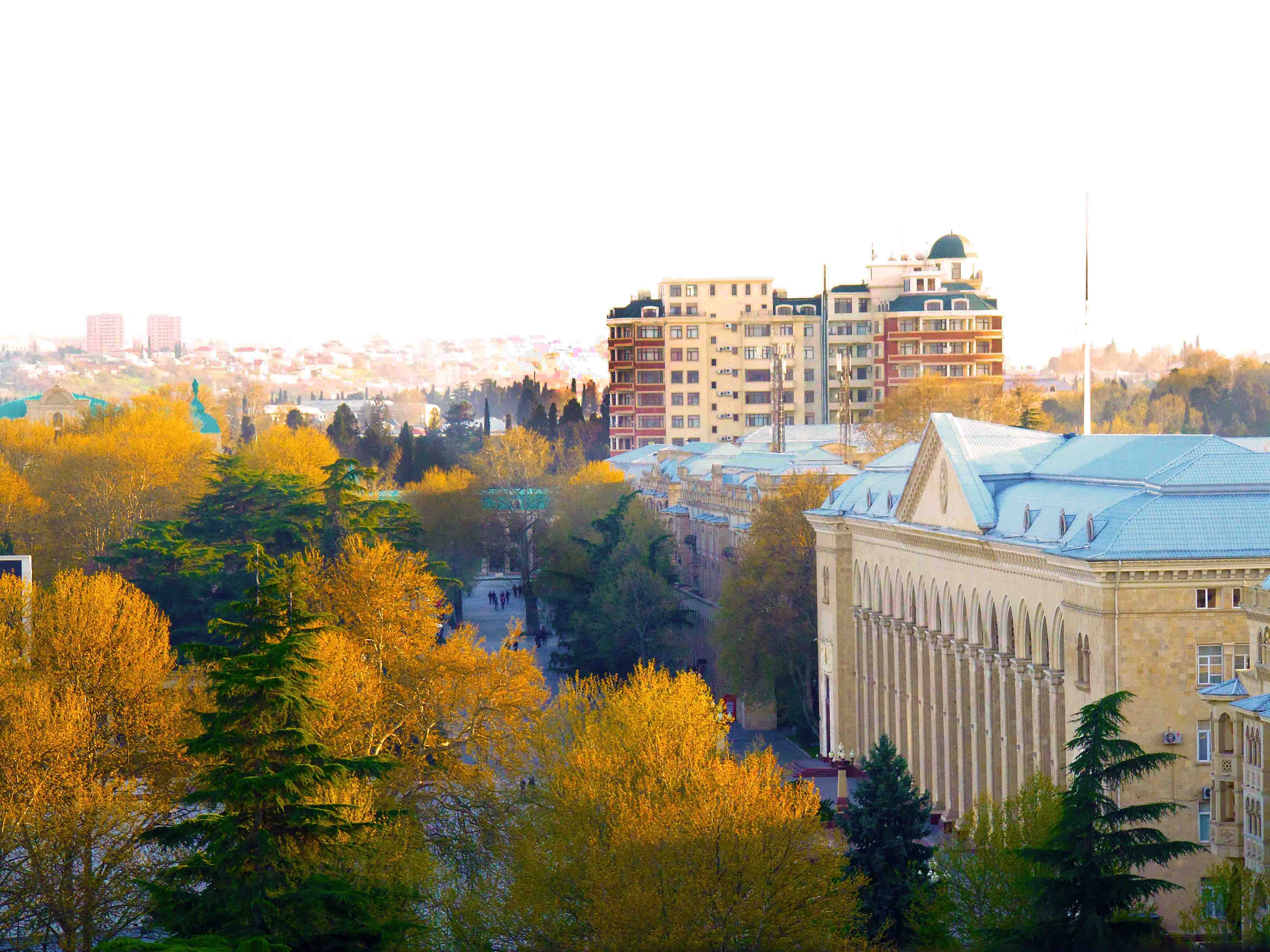
Ganja city in April 2018.

== Geography ==
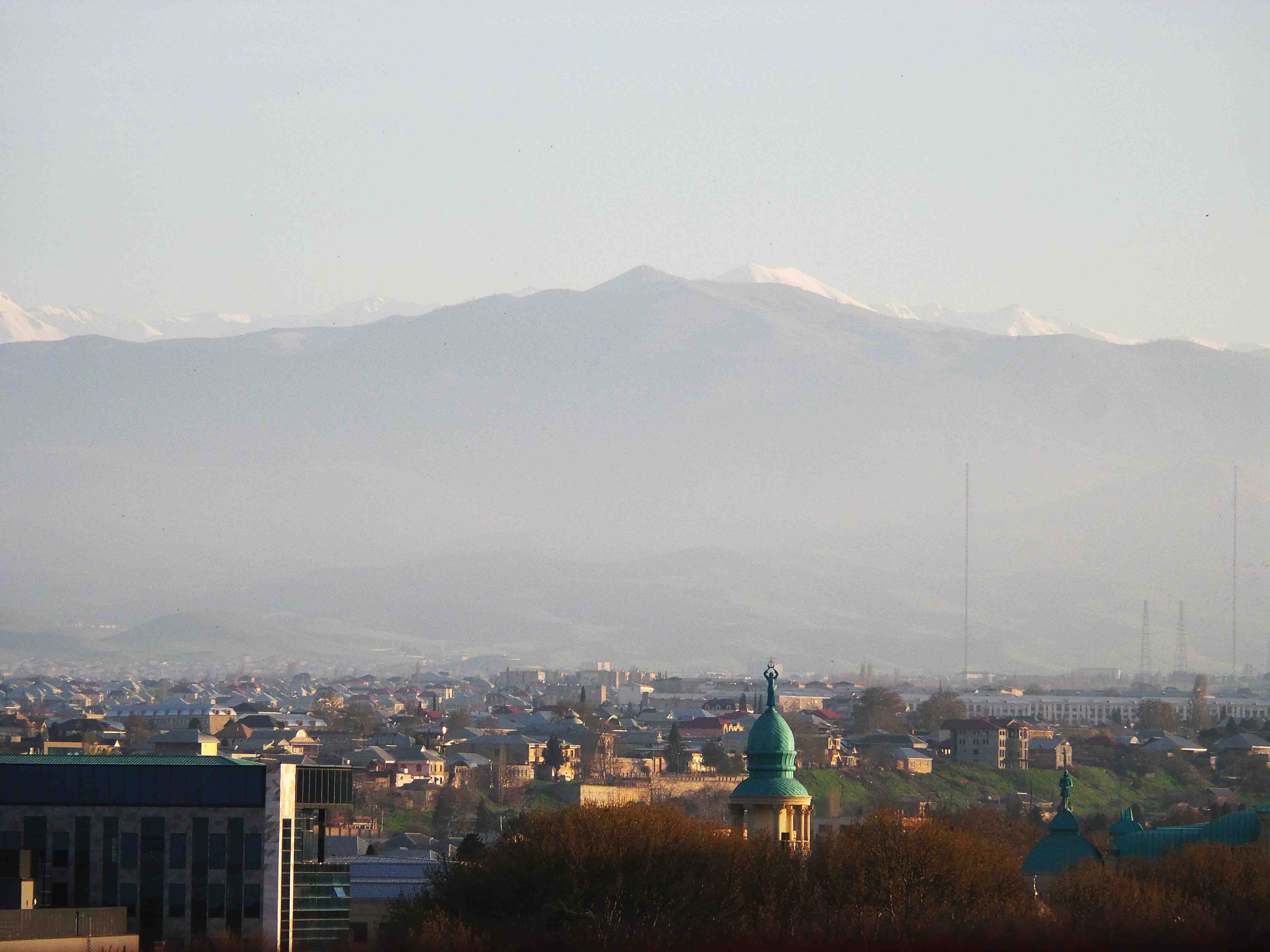
City of Ganja, Azerbaijan and Javadkhan mount

=== Location ===
Ganja, located 400–450 meters (1,310–1,480 ft) above the sea level, lies on the Ganja-Dashkasan plain in the Kur-Araz lowland in the west of Azerbaijan, 375 km (233 mi) away from Baku. It is situated at the north-eastern foothills of the Lesser Caucasus mountain ranges on the Ganjachay river.

The city borders on the administrative rayons of Goygol to the south, west and north-west and Samukh to the north-east.

=== Climate ===
Ganja has a cool semi-arid climate (Köppen climate classification: BSk), with an average annual precipitation of 241 millimetres (9.5 in), though annual precipitation varies in different years, ranging from 160 mm (6.3 in) in 1932 to 1,133 mm (44.6 in) in 1988. Winters are cold and may see snow, with 14 days per year in which snow cover is observed. Blizzard is seen in 0.2 days annually.

Climate data for Ganja (1991–2020 normals, extremes 1890–present)
Month	Jan	Feb	Mar	Apr	May	Jun	Jul	Aug	Sep	Oct	Nov	Dec	Year
Record high °C (°F)	22.8 (73.0)	25.0 (77.0)	29.7 (85.5)	35.6 (96.1)	39.5 (103.1)	39.2 (102.6)	42.0 (107.6)	41.7 (107.1)	38.8 (101.8)	33.4 (92.1)	29.0 (84.2)	23.3 (73.9)	42.0 (107.6)
Mean daily maximum °C (°F)	7.8 (46.0)	8.6 (47.5)	13.8 (56.8)	19.2 (66.6)	25.0 (77.0)	30.4 (86.7)	32.4 (90.3)	31.8 (89.2)	26.7 (80.1)	20.3 (68.5)	13.0 (55.4)	9.2 (48.6)	19.9 (67.7)
Daily mean °C (°F)	3.3 (37.9)	4.3 (39.7)	8.2 (46.8)	13.1 (55.6)	18.7 (65.7)	23.8 (74.8)	26.3 (79.3)	26.1 (79.0)	21.1 (70.0)	15.3 (59.5)	8.8 (47.8)	4.6 (40.3)	14.5 (58.0)
Mean daily minimum °C (°F)	0.8 (33.4)	1.1 (34.0)	4.0 (39.2)	9.2 (48.6)	14.3 (57.7)	18.6 (65.5)	21.2 (70.2)	20.9 (69.6)	16.5 (61.7)	11.5 (52.7)	5.5 (41.9)	2.2 (36.0)	10.5 (50.9)
Record low °C (°F)	−17.8 (0.0)	−15.2 (4.6)	−12.0 (10.4)	−4.4 (24.1)	1.5 (34.7)	5.8 (42.4)	10.1 (50.2)	10.5 (50.9)	2.8 (37.0)	−1.3 (29.7)	−7.9 (17.8)	−13.0 (8.6)	−17.8 (0.0)
Average precipitation mm (inches)	12.5 (0.49)	13.2 (0.52)	24.1 (0.95)	27.9 (1.10)	35.6 (1.40)	32.6 (1.28)	17.3 (0.68)	15.1 (0.59)	23.6 (0.93)	25.4 (1.00)	19.4 (0.76)	9.7 (0.38)	256.4 (10.08)
Average precipitation days (≥ 0.1 mm)	7	7	8	8.2	9	7	4	3	4	6.3	6.5	6	76
Average snowy days	3	5	2	0.2	0	0	0	0	0	0.4	1	2	14
Average relative humidity (%)	71	71	68	70	68	61	59	61	65	74	76	74	68
Mean monthly sunshine hours	120	113	141	182	229	267	278	252	212	168	123	115	2,200
Source 1: Deutscher Wetterdienst (precipitation days 1981–2010, sun 1961–1990) (Note: Station ID for Gandja is 37735 Use this station ID to locate the sunshine duration)Starlings Roost Weather
Source 2: Pogoda.ru.net

== Administrative divisions ==
Today, Ganja is divided into 2 rayons (administrative districts). The mayor, presently Niyazi Bayramov embodies the executive power of the city. Ganja includes 6 administrative settlements, namely Hajikend, Javadkhan, Shikhzamanli, Natavan, Mahsati and Sadilli.

=== Kapaz rayon ===
Kapaz District (Kəpəz rayonu) was established on 21 November 1980 according to the decision of Supreme Soviet of Azerbaijan SSR. The district consists of 2 administrative territorial units and 6 administrative settlements. It has an area of approximately 70 square kilometers (750,000,000 square feet)mi) with the population of 178,000.

=== Nizami rayon ===
Nizami District (Nizami rayonu) was also established on 21 November 1980 according to the decision of Supreme Soviet of Azerbaijan SSR as Ganja raion of Kirovabad city. When Ganja's historic name was restored and the city was renamed as Ganja instead of Kirovabad in 1989, the district was also renamed as Nizami rayon. The district consists of 2 administrative territorial units. The area of the district is roughly 39 square kilometers (420,000,000 square feet)mi) and population is 148,000.

== Demographics ==
Ethnic groups in Ganja
Year	Azerbaijanis	%	Armenians	%	Russians	%	Others ^{1}	%	TOTAL
1886	11,139	54.9	8,914	43.9	131	0.6	110	0.5	20,294
1892	13,392	51.8	10,524	40.8			1,842	7.2	25,758
1897	17,426	51.8	12,055	35.9	2,519	7.5	1,625	4.8	33,625
1916	37,619	65.2	12,125	21.0	6,091	10.6	1,896	3.3	57,731
1926	30,878	53.8	16,148	28.1	4,470	7.8	5,897	10.3	57,339
1939	49,755	50.3	27,121	27.4	16,992	17.2	4,626	4.7	98,494
1959	63,258	54.5	32,371	27.9	16,545	14.2	4,039	3.5	116,122
1970	122,973	64.9	40,588	21.4	22,022	11.6	3,929	2.1	189,512
1979	167,251	72.4	40,354	17.5	19,822	8.6	3,639	1.6	231,066
1999	294,876	98.5	32	0.01	2,814	0.9	1,620	0.5	299,342
2009	311,813	99.5	6	0	895	0.3	535	0.2	313,249
^{1} Georgians, Jews, Ukrainians etc.

Ganja is the third largest city of Azerbaijan after Baku and Sumqayit with about 335,600 residents. The city is also inhabited by a large number of Azerbaijani refugees from Armenia and IDPs from the Azerbaijani community of Nagorno-Karabakh and surrounding areas. Their number was estimated to be more than 33,000 in 2011.

Lezgi people in Ganja number around 20,000.

=== Historic Armenian community ===
In addition to Persian and Turkic-speaking Muslims, the city had a numerically, economically and culturally significant Christian Armenian community. The city's traditional Armenian name is Gandzak (Գանձակ), which derives from gandz (գանձ), a loan word from Old Iranian, which means treasure or riches. The founder of the Hethumid dynasty, Oshin of Lampron was an Armenian nakharar (prince) and lord of a castle near Ganja who fled to Cilicia in 1075 during the Seljuk invasion of Armenia.

The city's historically important Armenian figures include:

- Mkhitar Gosh, 12th-century philosopher, author of the Code of Laws that was used in Armenia, Armenian Kingdom of Cilicia and Armenian diaspora communities in Europe
- Kirakos Gandzaketsi, a 13th-century historian
- Vardan Areveltsi, 13th-century polymath
- Grigor Paron-Ter, Armenian Patriarch of Jerusalem in 1613–45
- Karo Halabyan, Soviet architect
- Askanaz Mravyan, secretary of the Armenian SSR Communist Party
- Abram Alikhanov and Artem Alikhanian, physicists
- Sergei Adian, Soviet mathematician
- Albert Azaryan, artistic gymnast and Olympic champion

=== Religion ===
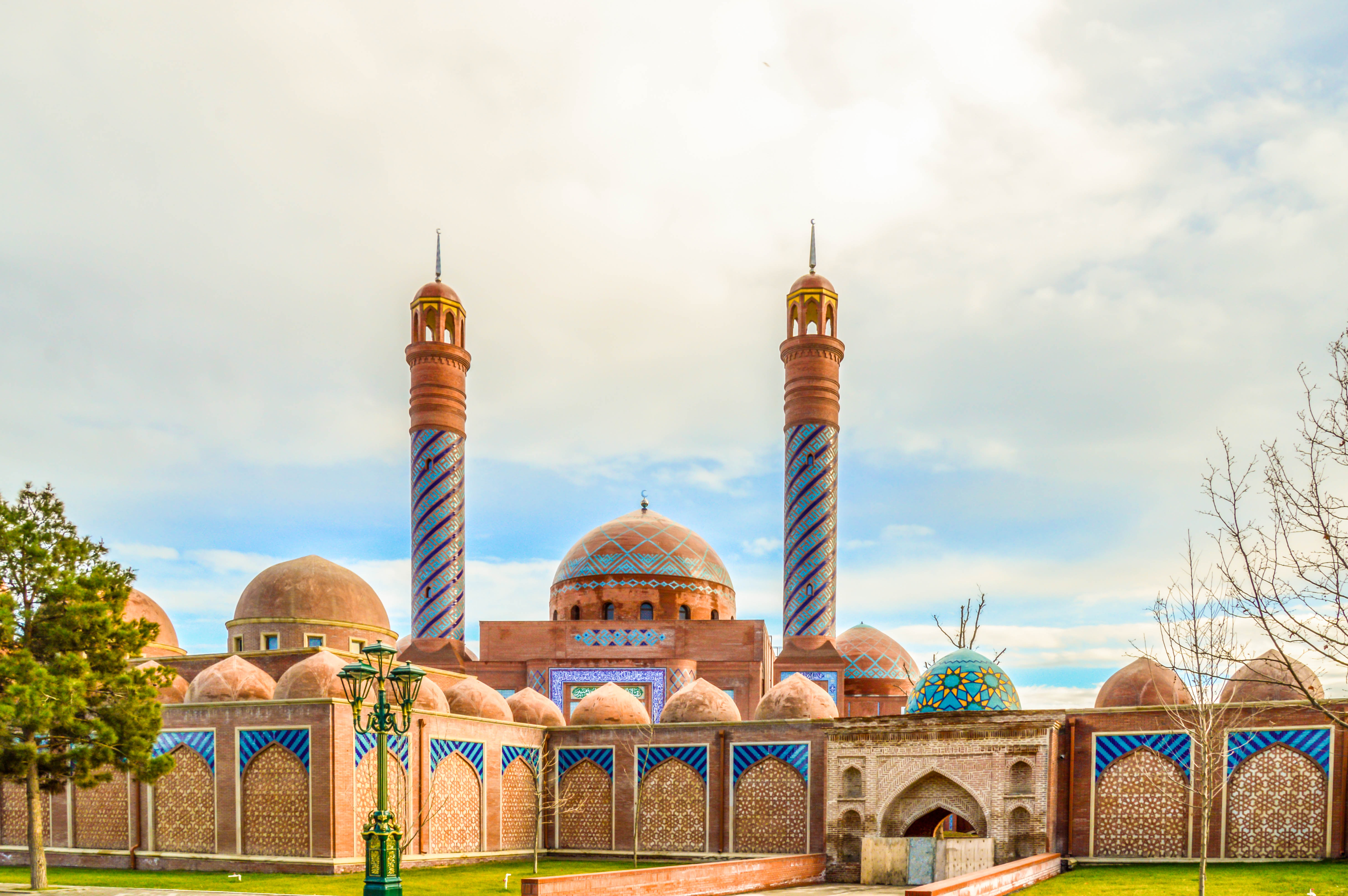
Imamzadeh religious complex

The urban landscape of Ganja is shaped by many communities. Religious diversity has however greatly decreased over the last decades, with the emigration of most Armenians, Slavs, Jews and Germans. The religion with the largest community of followers by far is Islam. The majority of the Muslims are Shia Muslims, and the Republic of Azerbaijan has the second-highest Shia population percentage in the world after Iran. The city's notable mosques include Shah Abbas Mosque, the Imamzadeh Complex incorporating the Goy Imam Mosque, Shahsevenler Mosque, Qirikhli Mosque and Qazakhlar Mosque.

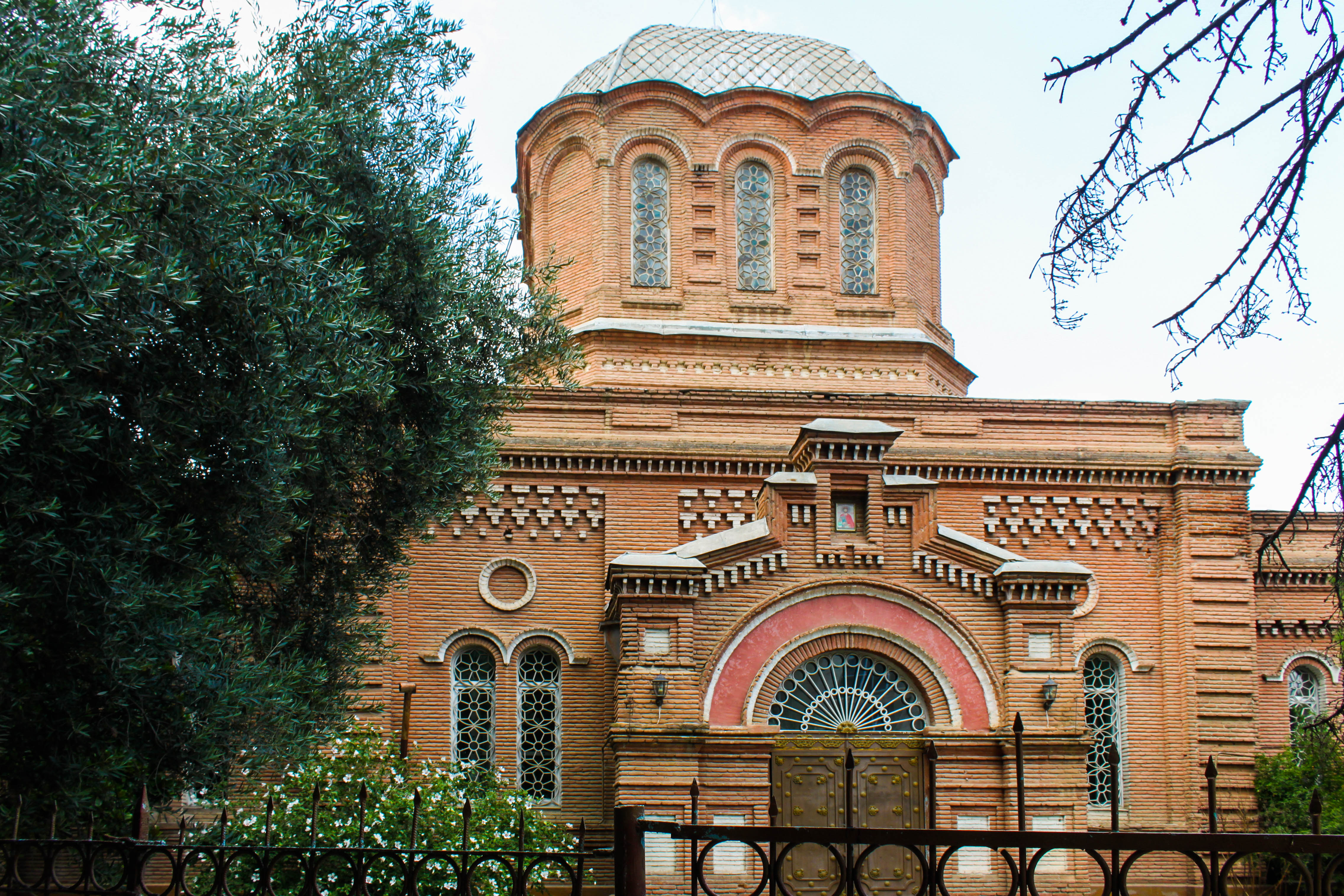
Alexander Nevsky Church

There are some other faiths practiced among the different ethnic groups within the country. The other faith worshipping places include Alexander Nevsky Church, German Lutheran Church, Saint John Church and Saint Sarkis Church. Before the Kirovabad pogrom in 1988 a significant community of Armenian Christians existed.

=== Population ===
According to the State Statistics Committee, as of 2018, the population of the city recorded 332,600 persons, which increased by 31,900 persons (about 10.6 percent) from 300,700 persons in 2000. Of the total population, 162,300 are men and 170,300 are women. More than 26 percent of the population (about 86,500 persons) consists of young people and teenagers aged 14–29.

Population of the district by the year (at the beginning of the year, thsd. persons)
Region	2000	2014	2015	2016	2017	2018	2019	2020	2021
Ganja town	300,7	324,7	328,4	330,1	331,4	332,6	334,0	335,6	335,8
Nizami region	...	150,4	151,2	151,6	152,0	152,5	153,0	153,0	
Kapaz region	...	178,0	178,9	179,8	180,6	181,5	182,6	182,8	

== Economy ==
The economy of Ganja is partially agricultural, partially tourist based, with some industries in operation. Ore minerals extracted from nearby mines supply Ganja's metallurgical industries, which produces copper and alumina. There are porcelain, silk and footwear industries. Other industries process food, grapes and cotton from the surrounding farmlands.

The city has one of the largest textile conglomerates in Azerbaijan and is famous for a fabric named Ganja silk, which received the highest marks in the markets of neighboring countries and the Middle East.

People are mainly employed in manufacturing, education, transportation, service sectors and catering. Det.Al-Aluminium is the largest employer operating in Ganja, followed by Ganja Auto Plant and Ganja Winery Plant 2.

=== Tourism and shopping ===
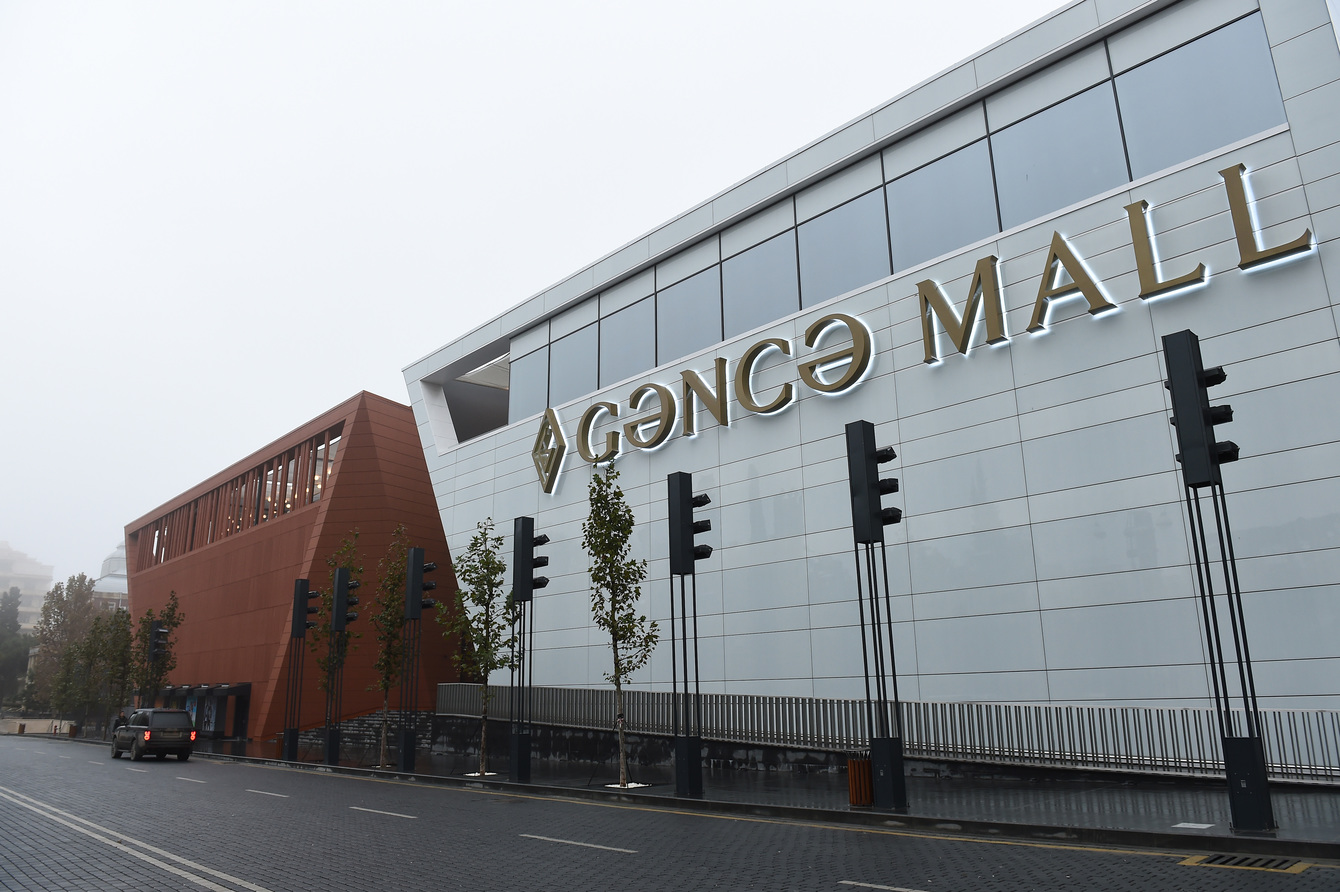
Ganja Mall

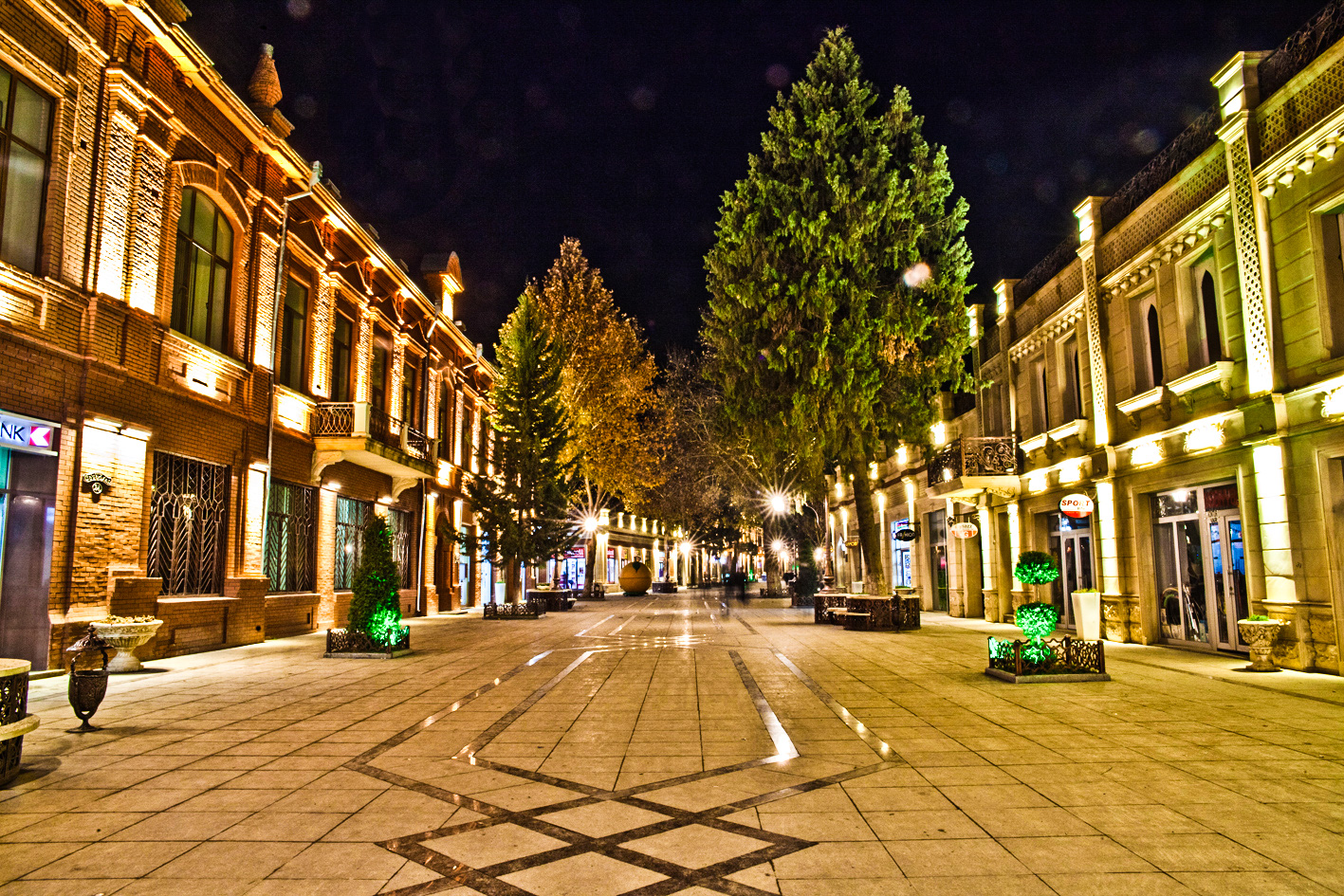
Javad khan street in Ganja

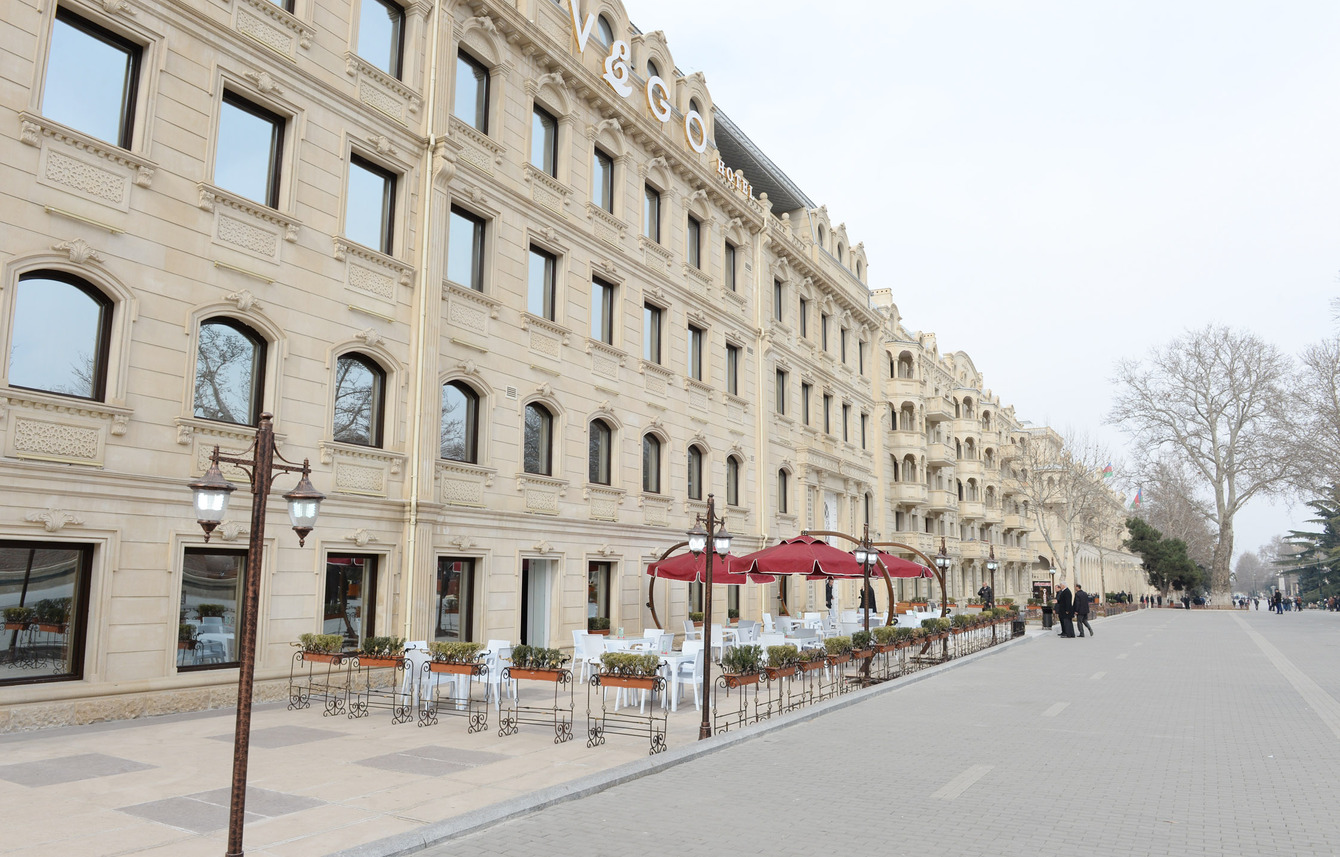
Vego Hotel, Ganja

Traditional shops, modern shops and malls create a mixture of shopping opportunities in Ganja. Javad Khan Street is the traditional shopping street that is located in the old town. Constructed between 2014 and 2017, Ganja Mall is considered the city's largest mall. Other shopping centers include Khamsa Park, Taghiyev Mall and Aura Park.

Ganja is one of the famous tourist destinations in Azerbaijan with its historic buildings such as Nizami Mausoleum, Ancient gates, Juma Mosque, Imamzadeh, Tomb of Javad Khan, Chokak Hamam, Shah Abbas Caravanserai and Ugurlu Bay Caravanserai.

Other tourist and entertainment spots include Javad khan street, Triumphal Arch near Heydar Aliyev Center, the Bottle House, Flag square, Hajikend resort zone. Goygol National Park with the sceneries of lake Goygol, lake Maralgol, Mount Kapaz and Mount Murov are located near Ganja.

In 2016, Ganja was selected as the European Youth Capital by the final decision of international jury at the General Assembly of the European Youth Forum. Ganja became the first city to win the title of European Youth Capital among the former Commonwealth Independent States (CIS) and non-EU cities. It was an event with a budget of 5.7 million euros, projected to boost tourism by about one-fifth.

== Culture ==
Some of the city landmarks include Gates of Ganja.

As of 2012, the city along with Baku and Lankaran participates in Earth Hour movement.

=== Museums ===
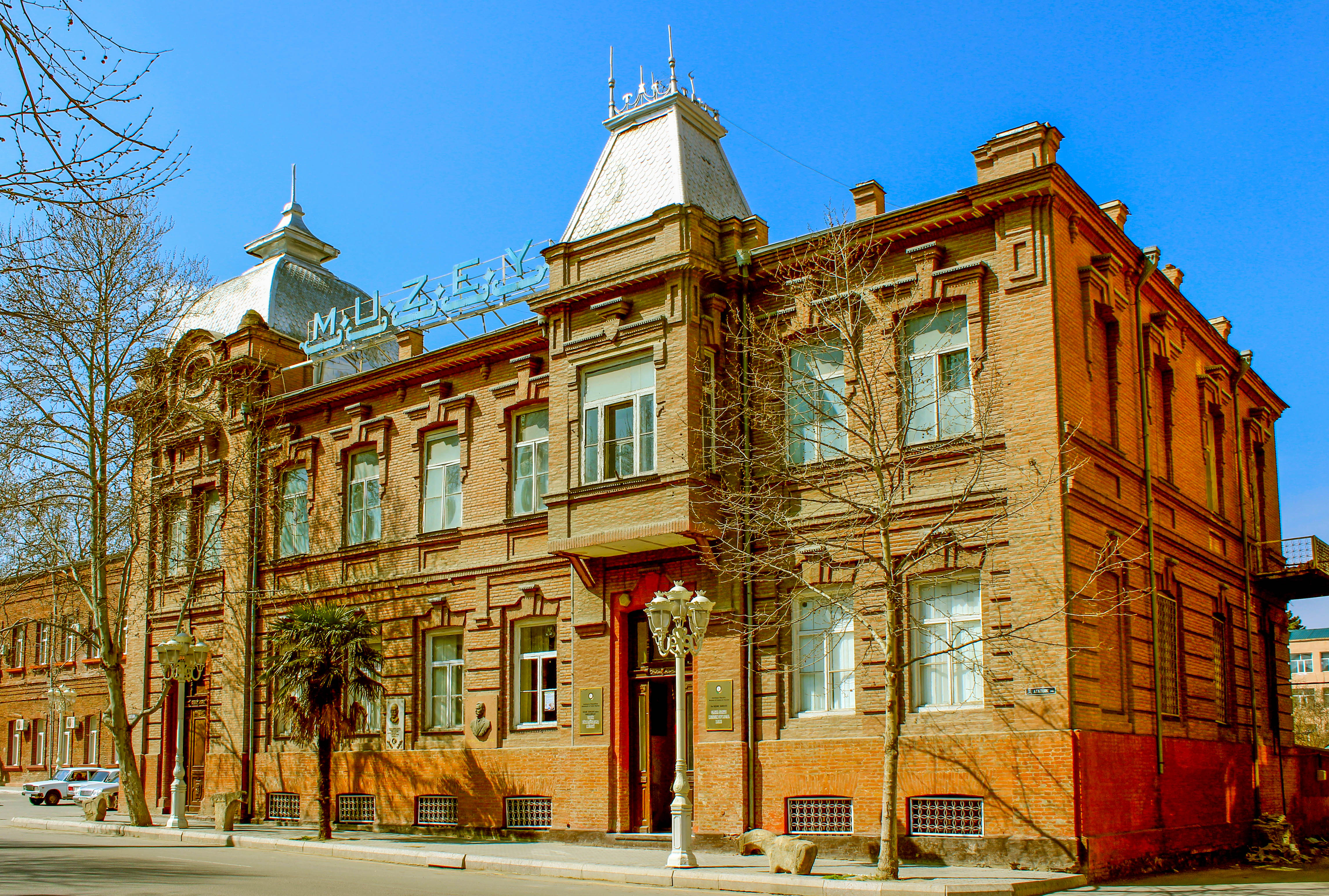
Ganja History Ethnography Museum

Ganja Fortress Gates – the Museum of Archaeology and Ethnography

Ganja State History-Ethnography Museum is the oldest museum in the city, with over 30,000 artifacts. The city is also home to Nizami Ganjavi Museum, which was built in 2014. The museum contains a research section, a library, a conference room, and corners for guests and tourists' relaxation.

Other museums include Heydar Aliyev Museum, House Museum of Mir Jalal Pashayev, Memorial House-Museum of Nizami Ganjavi, Memorial-House Museum of İsrafil Mammadov, Ganja branch of Museum of Miniature Books, "Ganja Castle Gates – Archaeology and Ethnography Museum" monument complex, Cultural Center named after Mahsati Ganjavi, Museum of Modern Art and Museum of Mirza Shafi Vazeh.

=== Galleries ===
Ganja State Art Gallery was established in April 1984 according to the decision of Council of Ministers of Azerbaijan SSR. The Gallery is headed by the carpet-artist Faig Osmanov.

=== Architecture ===
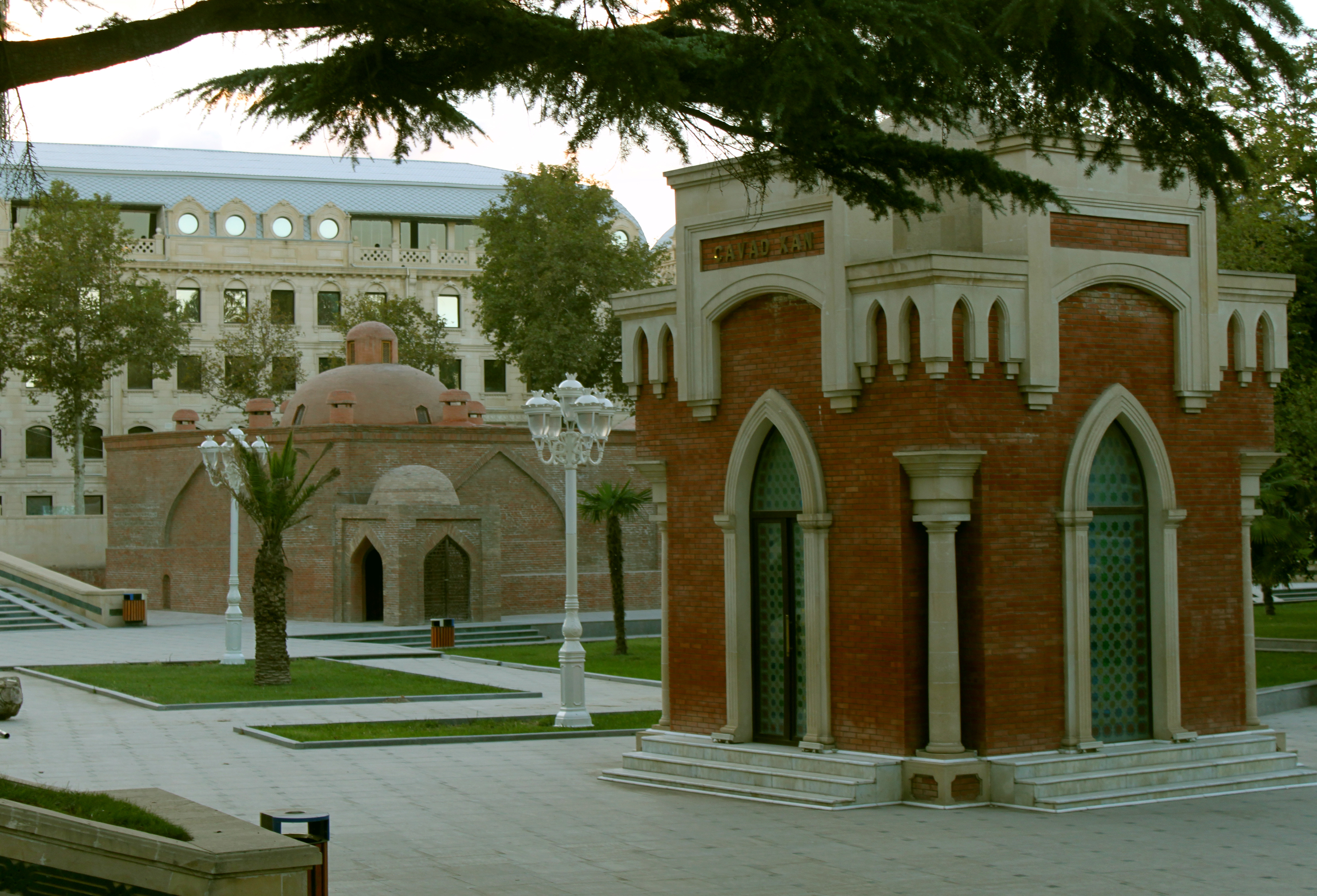
Chokak Bath and Javad Khan's tomb

Ganja is primarily known for its Azerbaijani and Islamic architecture, but its buildings reflect the various peoples and empires that have previously ruled the city. During the Ganja Khanate period, the Khans proceeded to make an indelible impression on the skyline of Ganja, building towering mosques and houses from red bricks.

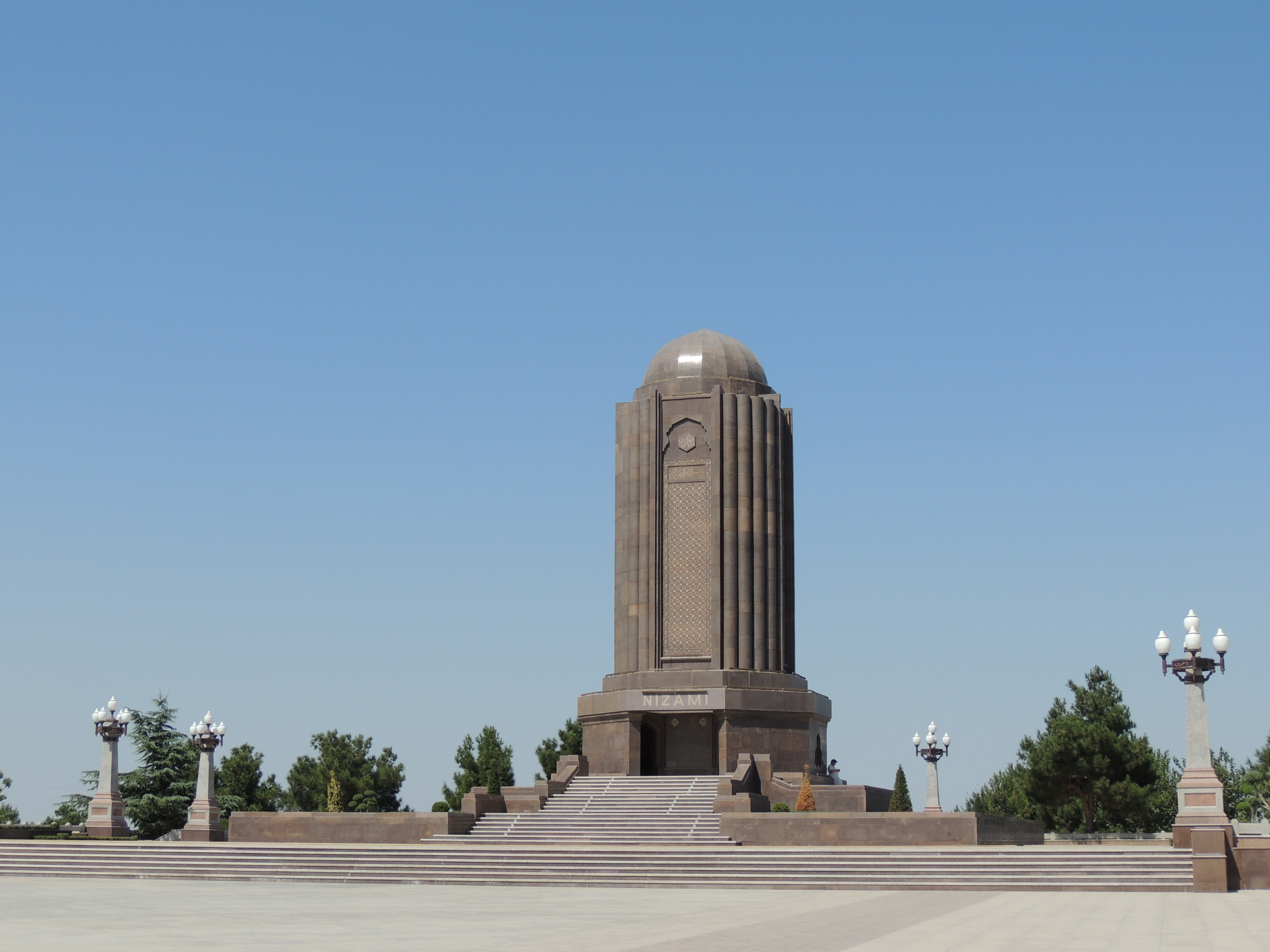
Nizami Ganjavi Mausoleum in Ganja

Among the oldest surviving examples of Islamic architecture in Ganja are the Nizami Mausoleum and Shah Abbas Caravanserai, which assisted the Shahs during their siege of the city. The area around and inside the mosques, contains many fine examples of traditional architecture like Chokak Bath.

Another interesting building is the Bottle house of Ganja.

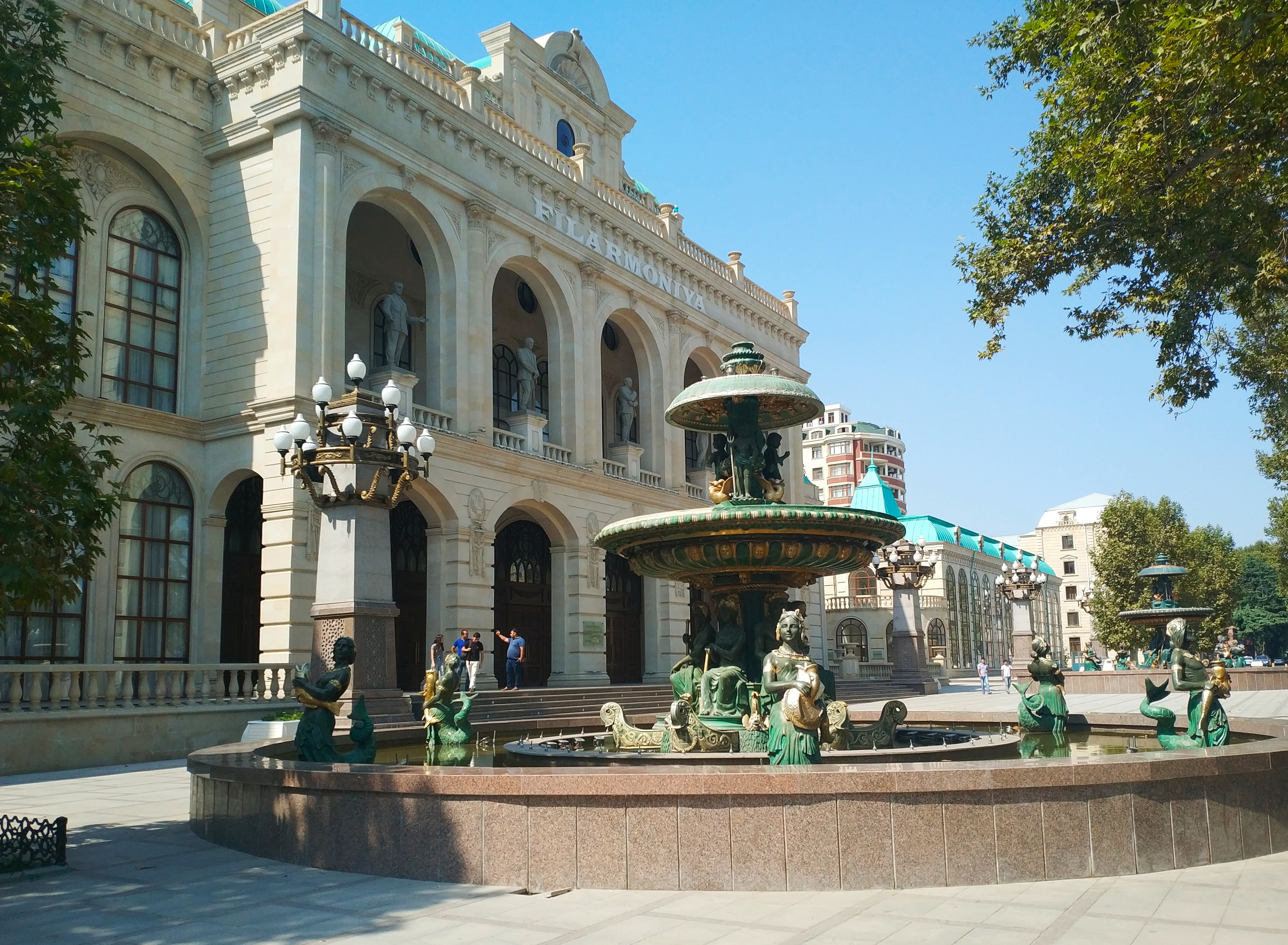
New building of Ganja State Philharmonic Hall

=== Music and media ===
The Ganja State Philharmonic was established in August 1990 according to the decision of the Ministry of Culture of the Azerbaijan SSR. On 21 January 2012, president Ilham Aliyev laid the foundation of the Ganja State Philharmonic. The facility includes a 1,200 concert hall, an open-air cinema theatre, a drawing gallery, an urban center and an observation tower. The new building of the Philharmonic Hall was put into use in 2017. The Goygol State Song and Dance Ensemble, the Orchestra of Folk Instruments and the Ganja State Chamber Orchestra operate under the Ganja State Philharmonic.

Bottle house in Ganja, a local icon entirely made of glass bottles

Two regional channels, Kapaz TV and Alternativ TV, are headquartered in Ganja. Two newspapers are published in Ganja (Gəncənin səsi and Novosti Qyandji).

=== Theaters ===
==== Ganja State Drama Theater ====
The building of the Ganja State Drama Theater was built by the German entrepreneur Christofor Forer in the 1880s. Ganja Drama Theater was established in 1921 in Baku as "Tənqid-təbliğ" (literally means "Criticism-propaganda"). In 1935 the theater moved to Ganja with its staff and continues its activity here under different names until 1990. The theater has been called the Ganja State Drama Theater since 1990.

==== Ganja State Puppet Theater ====
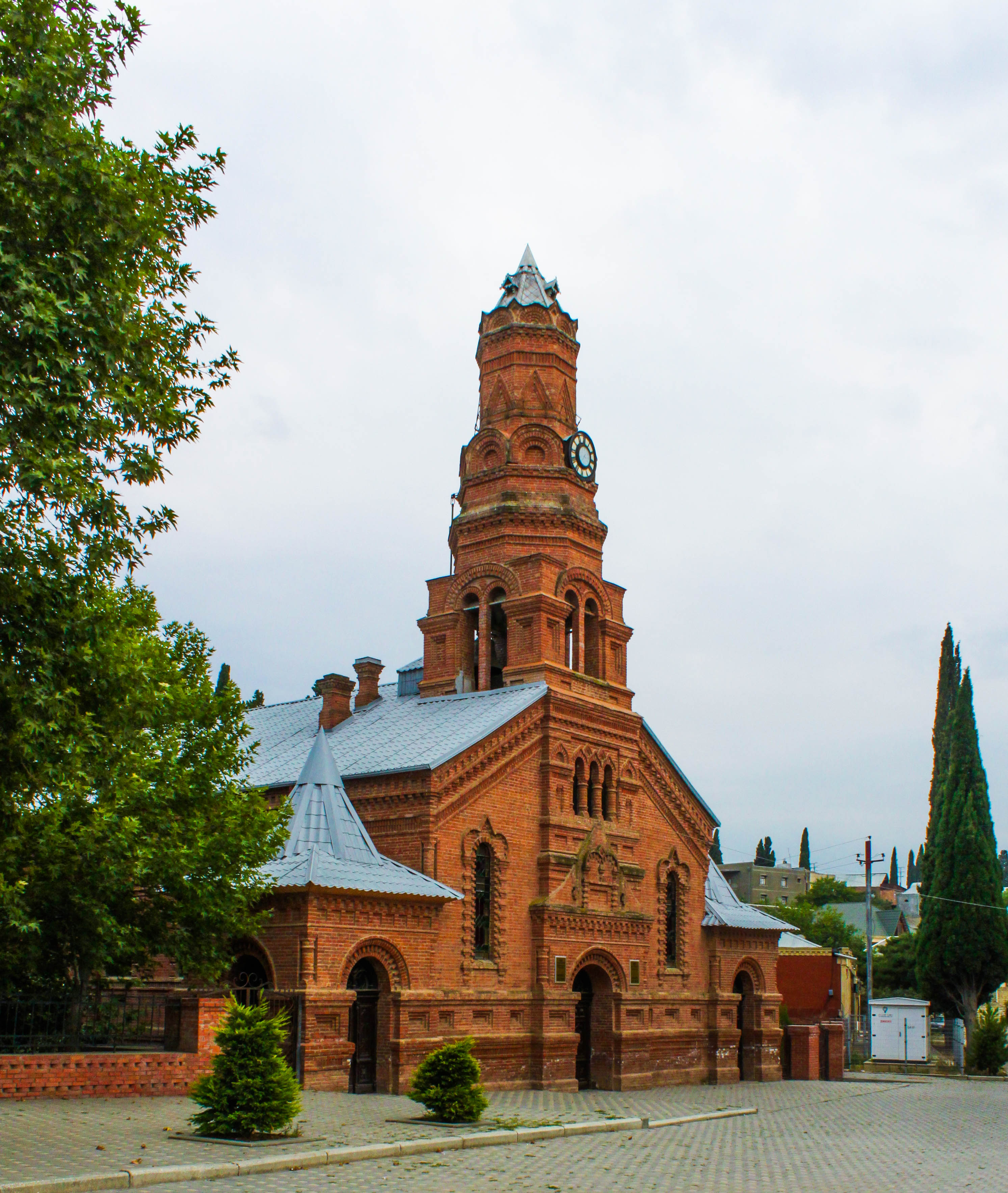
Ganja State Puppet Theater

Ganja State Puppet Theater was established according to Decree No. 299 of the Council of Ministers of the Azerbaijan SSR in September 1986. Before receiving "state theater" status in 1986, it was functioning as public theater. Ganja Puppet Theater operates in the building of Lutheran church constructed in 1885 by German settlers.

=== Parks and gardens ===
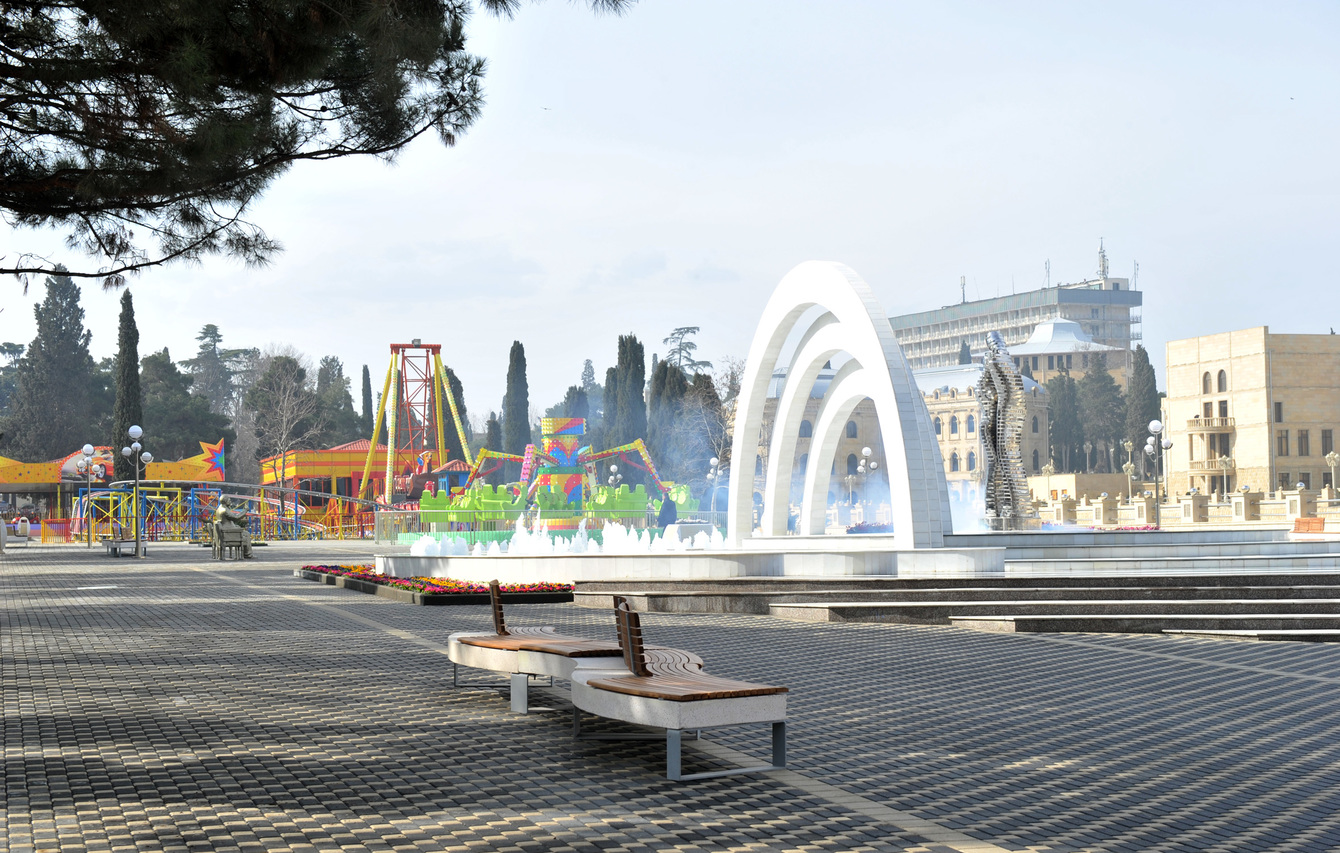
Ganjachay rpark-boulevard complex

Ganja has many parks and gardens, with the Khan's garden being one of the city's most known landmarks. It features a variety of landscaping, trees, and plants in an open concept.

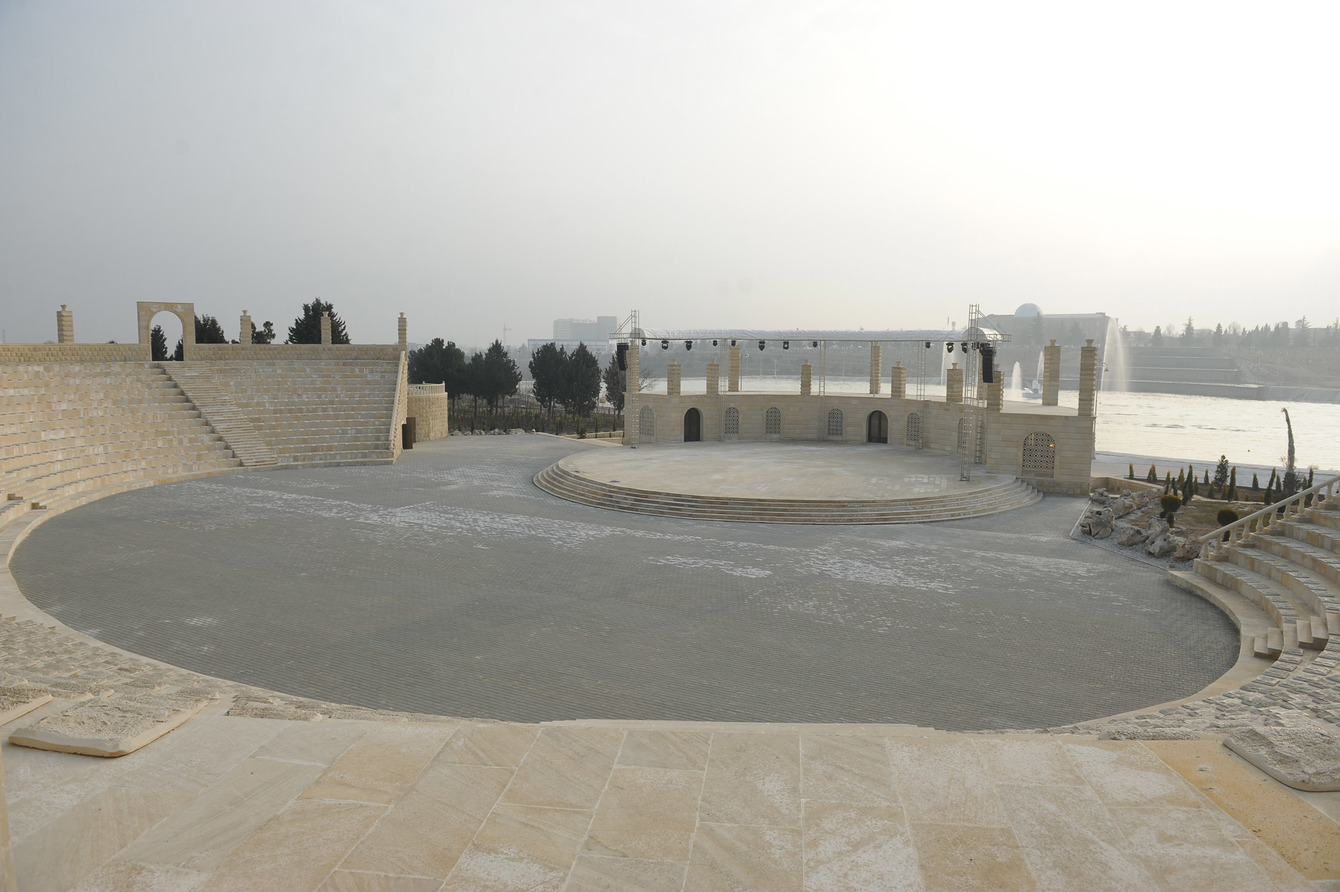
Amphitheater in Ganja (2014)

Other prominent parks and gardens include Heydar Aliyev Park Complex, "Ganja 2016 European Youth Capital Park", "Ganja river" park-boulevard complex, Istiglal Avenue, Fikrat Amirov Park, Fuzuli Park, and Narimanov Park. Heydar Aliyev Park Complex includes an Amphitheater considered for organizing large outdoor events for up to 5000 people.

=== Sports ===
New Ganja City Stadium, September 2025

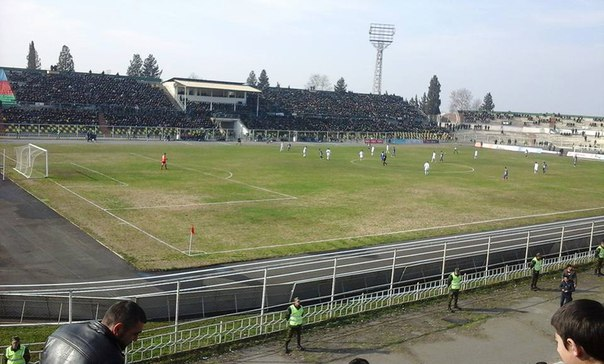
Old Ganja City Stadium in 10 March 2016

The city has one professional football team, Kapaz, currently competing in the second-flight of Azerbaijani football, the Azerbaijan First Division. The club has three Azerbaijani league and four cup titles.

There are Olympic Sports Complex with 2 buildings (put into operation in 2002 and 2006 respectively), Ganja City Stadium with a capacity of 27,000 put into use in 1964 and other sporting facilities in Ganja.

In September 2017 "Ganja Marathon 2017" was organized involving 11,000 people from different regions of Azerbaijan, as well as foreigners under the slogan "Be with us in the Marathon". The race started from Triumphal Arch and finished at the Heydar Aliyev Park Complex covering a distance of 17 kilometers.

== Transportation ==
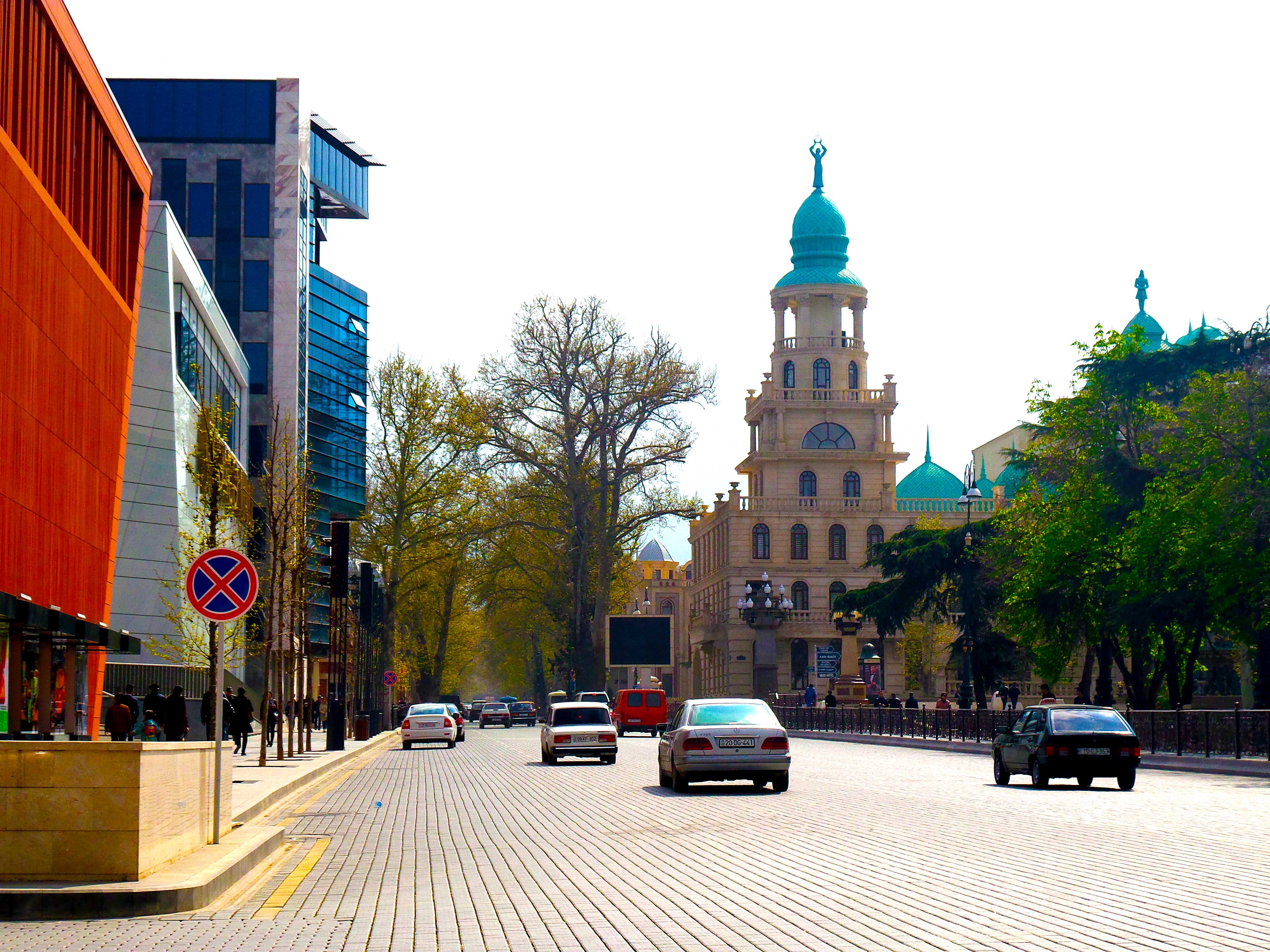
City of Ganja, Azerbaijan

=== Public transport ===
Ganja has a large urban transport system, mostly managed by the Ministry of Transportation. In 2013, Ministry of Transportation stated that the city, along with Nakhchivan and Sumqayit will have a new subway line within the framework of the 20-year subway program. The city had a trolleybus system, functioning from 1955 to 2004.

Ganja is without a tram system since Ganja tramway network ceased in the 1980s.

Public transport in Ganja, the second largest city of Azerbaijan, is primarily served by municipal bus routes. Since the introduction of the CityCard system, cashless payment has become the main method of fare collection. Passengers can pay for bus rides using a rechargeable contactless smart card or directly with any bank card (Visa and Mastercard).

The CityCard mobile application is available on both App Store and Google Play, allowing users to manage their balance and access route information. A detailed map of bus routes in Ganja is provided on the CityCard official website.

=== Air ===
Ganja International Airport is the only airport in the city. The airport is connected by bus to the city center. There are domestic flights to Baku and international service to Russia and Turkey.

=== Rail ===
Baku–Tbilisi–Kars railway directly connects the city with Turkey and Georgia.

Ganja sits on one of the Azerbaijani primary rail lines running east–west connecting the capital, Baku, with the rest of the country. The Baku–Tbilisi–Kars railway runs along the line through the city. The railway provides both human transportation and transport of goods and commodities such as oil and gravel.

Ganja's Central Railway Station is the terminus for national and international rail links to the city. The Baku–Tbilisi–Kars railway, which directly connects Turkey, Georgia and Azerbaijan, began to be constructed in 2007 and completed in 2017. The completed branch connects Ganja with Tbilisi in Georgia, and from there trains continue to Akhalkalaki, and Kars in Turkey.

== Education ==
The first seminary in Azerbaijan aimed at professional training of school teachers was opened in Ganja in 1914 which was united with Girls Seminary in 1927 and renamed as Ganja Pedagogical Technical School (Azerbaijani: Gəncə Pedoqoji Texnikumu).

Ganja is home to four major institutes for post-secondary education. Ganja State University was founded as Ganja Teachers Institute after Hasan bey Zardabi in 1939. In 2000, the President of Azerbaijan renamed the institute to Ganja State University. The university includes 8 faculty departments and 10 offices. The city also includes Azerbaijan State Agricultural University, Azerbaijan Technological University and a local branch of the Azerbaijan Teachers' Institute.

There are also schools offering secondary specialized education like Ganja Music College, Ganja Medicine College, Ganja State Regional College (established by combining Ganja Humanitarian College and Ganja Technical College in 2010).

There are a total of 7 schools offering vocational education in Ganja, being located as 3 vocational lyceums and a vocational school in Kapaz raion, a vocational lyceum and 2 vocational schools in Nizami raion.

== Notable residents ==
The city's notable residents include: poet Nizami Ganjavi, scientist Firuddin Babayev, Olympic champion Toghrul Asgarov, ruler of Ganja Khanate Javad Khan, poets Mirza Shafi Vazeh, Mahsati Ganjavi, Nigar Rafibeyli, writer Ibn Khosrov al-Ustad, composer Fikrat Amirov, historian Farid Alakbarli, major political figure Nasib Yusifbeyli, deputy speaker of Azerbaijan Democratic Republic, Hasan bey Aghayev, geologist Mirali Qashqai, prime minister of Azerbaijan Artur Rasizade, chess player Faiq Hasanov, footballer Mahmud Qurbanov, automotive designer Samir Sadikhov, and Supreme Court Justice Aziz Seyidov. There were also several notable Armenian residents of Ganja, including Mkhitar Gosh, Kirakos Gandzaketsi, Vardan Areveltsi, Grigor Paron-Ter, Karo Halabyan, Askanaz Mravyan and Albert Azaryan.

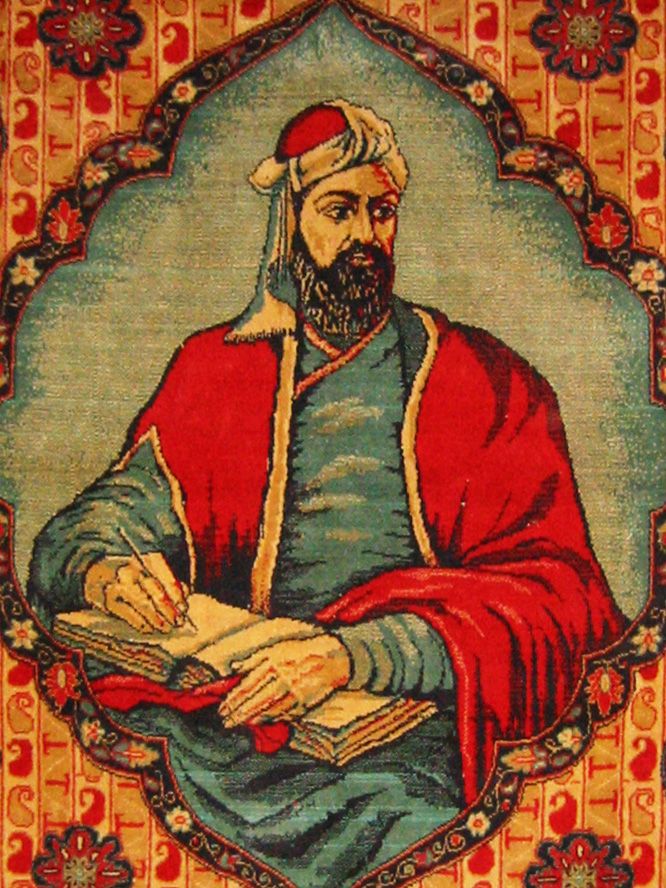
Nizami Ganjavi, the author of Khamsa, considered one of the Middle East's greatest poets.

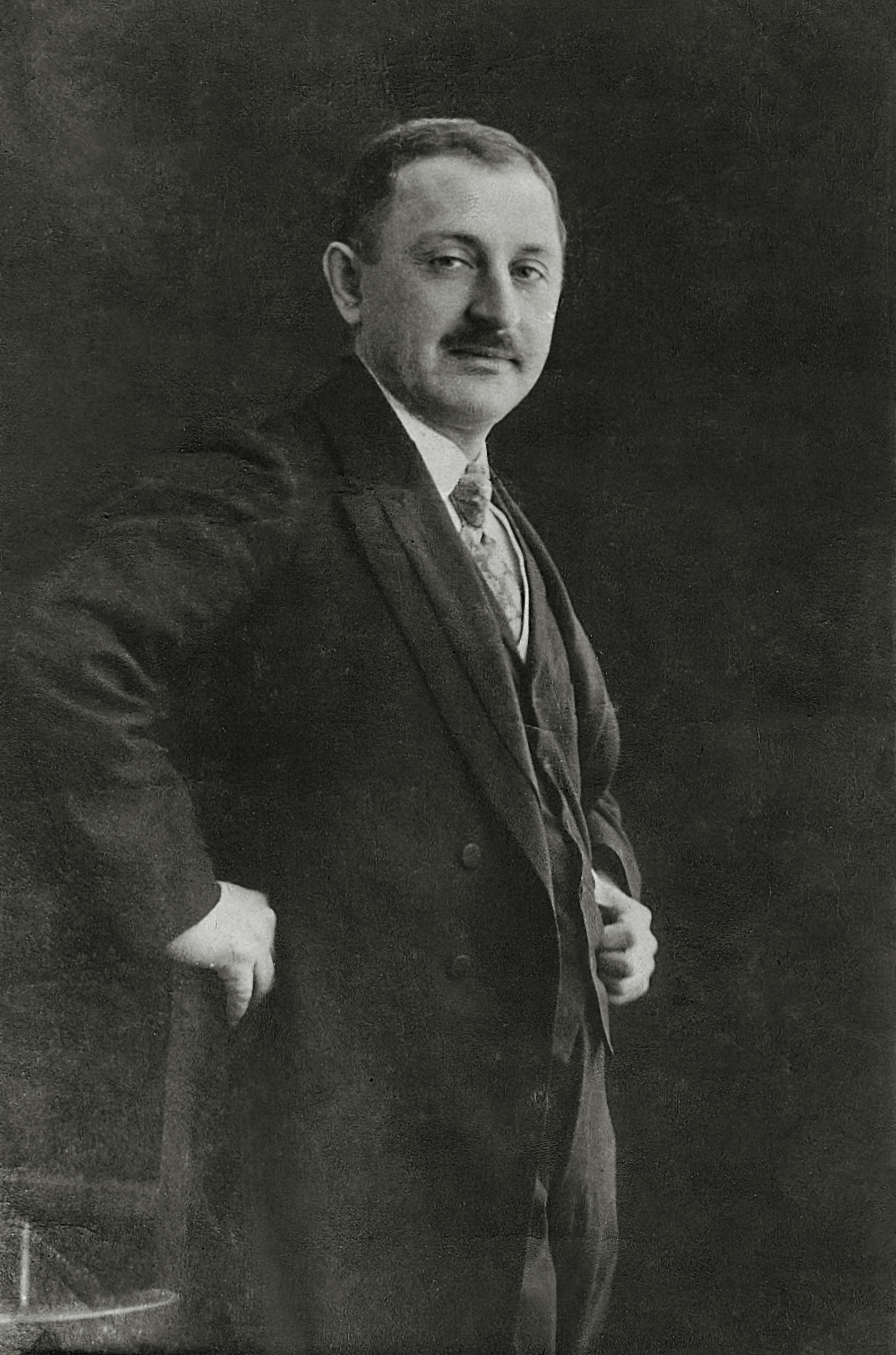
Nasib Yusifbeyli, was a major political figure in the Azerbaijan Democratic Republic.

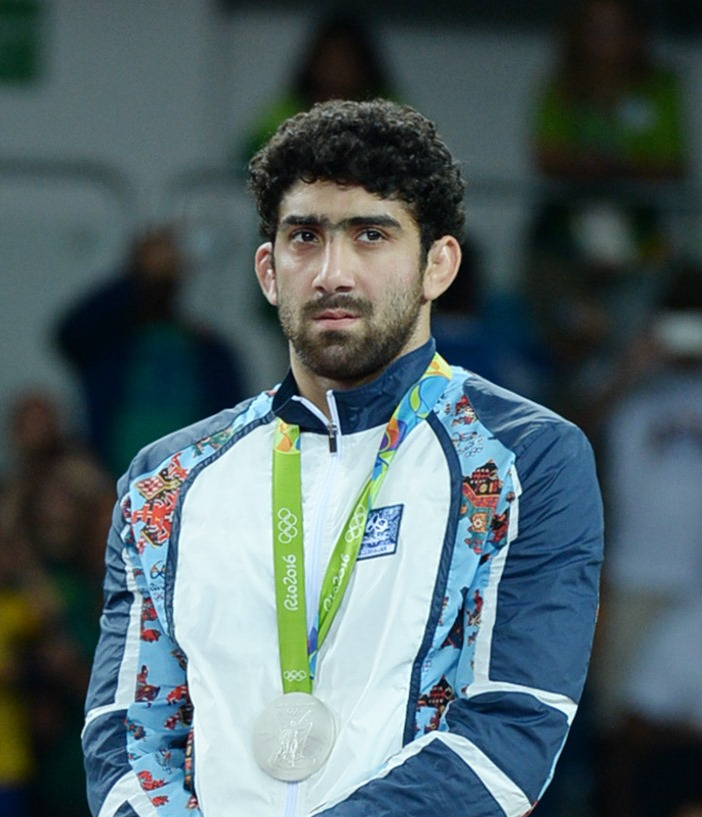
Toghrul Asgarov, Azerbaijani Olympic and European champion in freestyle wrestling.

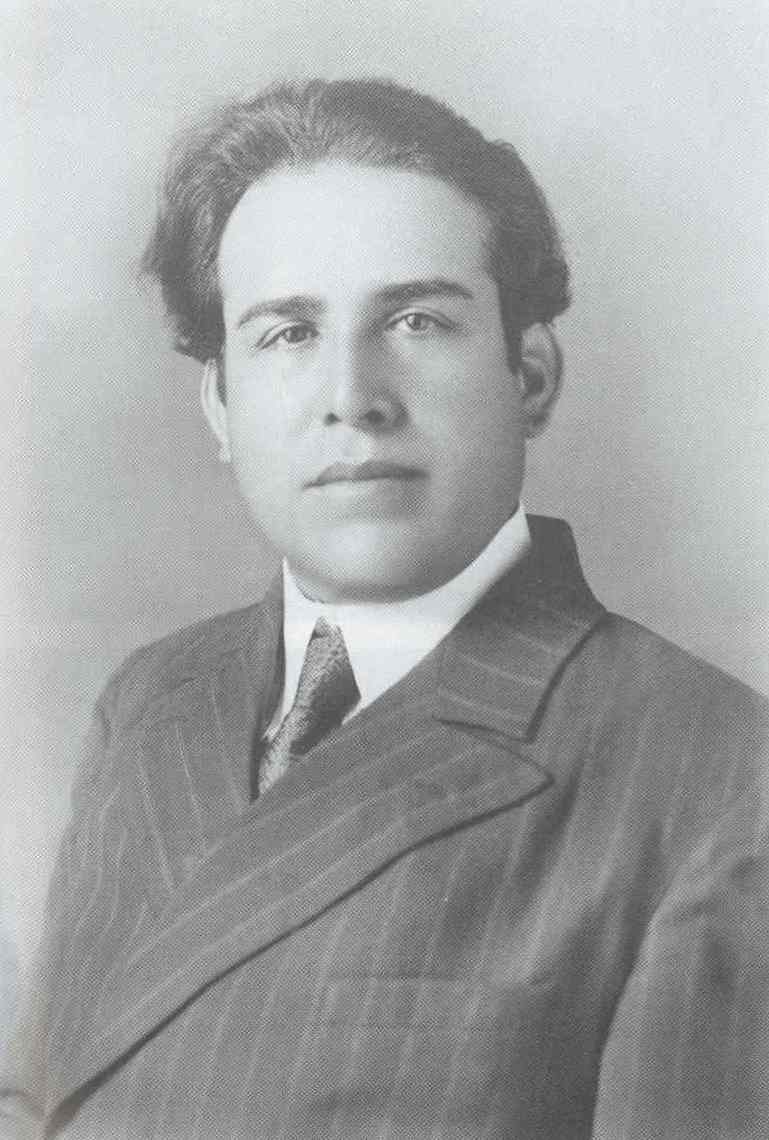
Mirali Qashqai, was an eminent Azerbaijani geologist, author of multitude works in the sphere of geomorphology and stratigraphy.

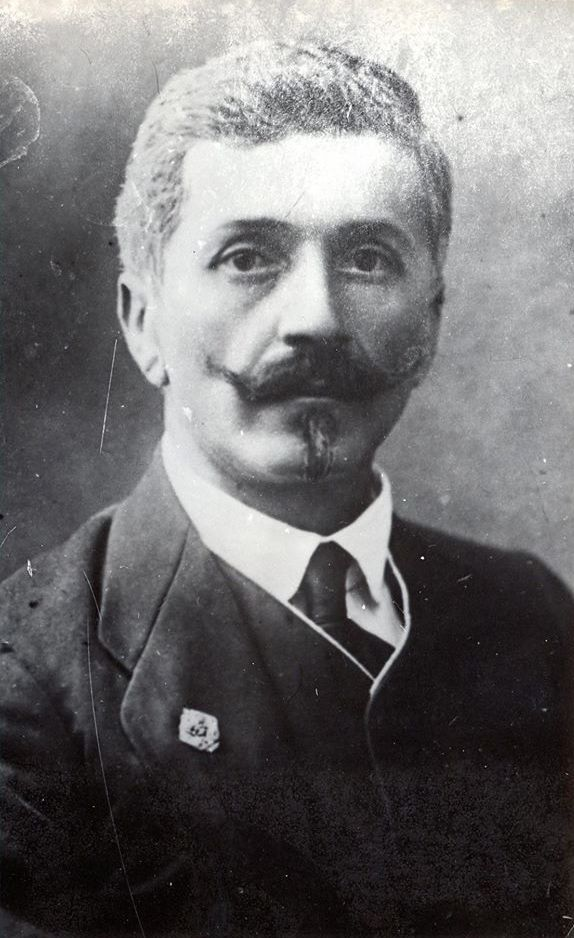
Hasan bey Aghayev, served as Deputy Speaker of the National Assembly of the Azerbaijan Democratic Republic.

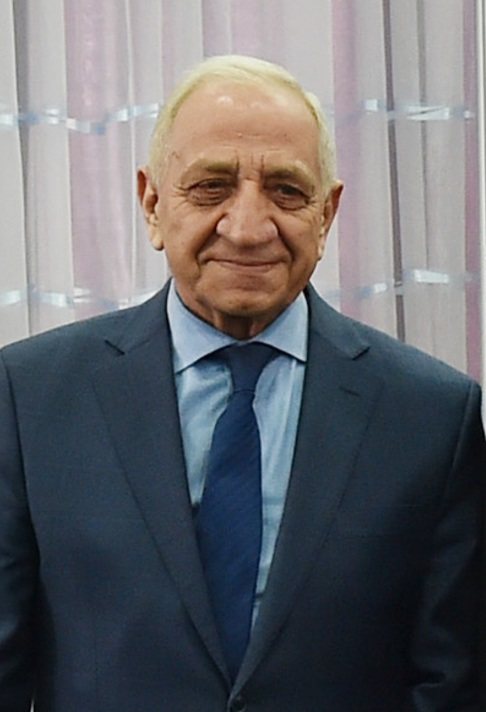
Faiq Hasanov, known as International Arbiter of chess and television presenter of weekly Chess Club programme.

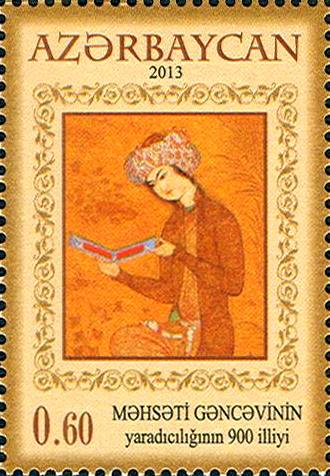
Mahsati, a 12th-century woman poet persecuted for her courageous poetry condemning religious fanaticism and dogmas.

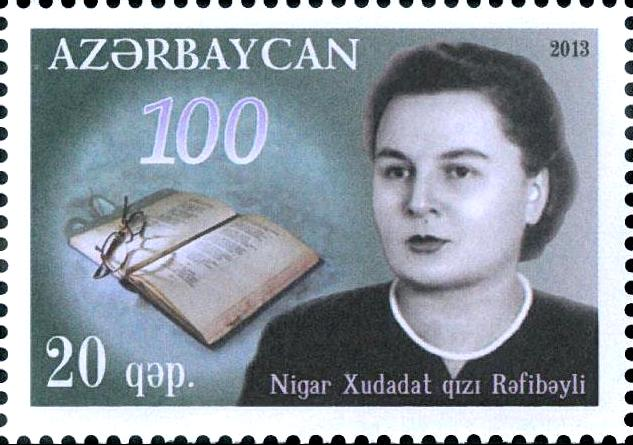
Nigar Rafibeyli, writer and the Chairman of the Writers' Union of Azerbaijan.

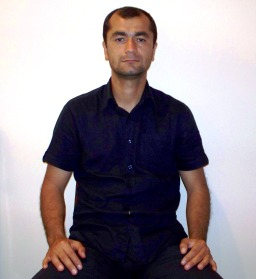
Mahmud Qurbanov, won Azerbaijan Premier League record 12 times with six different clubs.

== Twin towns – sister cities ==
Ganja is twinned with:

- Derbent, Russia
- Kars, Turkey (2001)
- (Georgia (country)) Kutaisi, Georgia (1996)
- Vung Tau, Vietnam
- Moscow, Russia
- Newark, United States (2004)
- Olomouc Region, Czech Republic (2012)
- Ordu, Turkey
- Aksaray, Turkey
- Tabriz, Iran (2015)
- Osh, Kyrgyzstan (2026)

== See also ==
- List of cities in Azerbaijan
- Mingachevir
- Nakhchivan (city)
- Qabala
- Sumgait
- Ganja rugs
