= Alexander Nevsky Church, Ganja =

Coordinates: 40.6792°N 46.3564°E

Alexander Nevsky Church
- Alexander Nevsky Church
- Location: Ganja
- Country: Azerbaijan
- Denomination: Eastern Orthodox Church

History
- Founded: 1887

Architecture
- Architectural type: Byzantine Revival architecture

The Alexander Nevsky Church (Azerbaijani: Aleksandr Nevski kilsəsi, Russian: Александро-Невская церковь) is a Russian Orthodox church in Ganja (Azerbaijan), built in 1887. Services at the church are carried out on Saturdays and Sundays, and also during the Twelve Great Feasts and Holidays. Andrey Bezotosny is currently the priest of the church.

== History ==
The church was constructed on the site of an ancient cemetery, allocated for charitable means by the local Orthodox Christians and Muslims. As of 1916, the church was considered a cathedral. The Alexander Nevsky Church was constructed in the Byzantine style with the use of brick called plinfa. In 1931, the church was closed down, and from 1935 to 1938 the building housed the museum of local history. Later the museum was transferred to another building and the church was turned into a warehouse. In 1946, the building was reopened as a church. Icons of the pre-revolutionary interior have survived. Among them there are icons of St. Alexander Nevsky and Mary Magdalene.

In September 1997, the 110th anniversary of the church was celebrated.
