= Grigor Paron-Ter =

Grigor Paron-Ter (Armenian: Գրիգոր Պարոն-Տեր), was the Armenian Patricarch of Jerusalem; He reigned from 1613 to 1645.

During his tenure, the Ottoman Empire was in crisis, which also impacted the Armenian people and Armenian Jerusalem. Even before entering into religious service, Paron-Ter, a native of Ganja in modern Azerbaijan, had campaigned to eliminate the burdensome debts of the patriarchate. He was able to secure major contributions, not only from Van, New Julfa, and Aleppo but also from places such as Urfa, and Bitlis, virtually encouraging their competition to erase the debt. During his thirty-two-year patriarchal reign, Paron-Ter expanded the Armenian presence in Jerusalem, acquiring new properties, organizing pilgrimages and creating a spiritual atmosphere within the monastery. Almost half of the present residential quarters of the Armenian monastery of St. James in Jerusalem were built during his rule.

== See also ==
List of Armenian Patriarchs of Jerusalem

Religious titles
Preceded by David Merdeentzee	Armenian Patriarch of Jerusalem; 1613–1645	Succeeded by Theodore III of Jerusalem (Asdvadzadoor Daronetzee)
