= Göygöl (Ganja) =

Goygol
- Azerbaijani: Göygöl
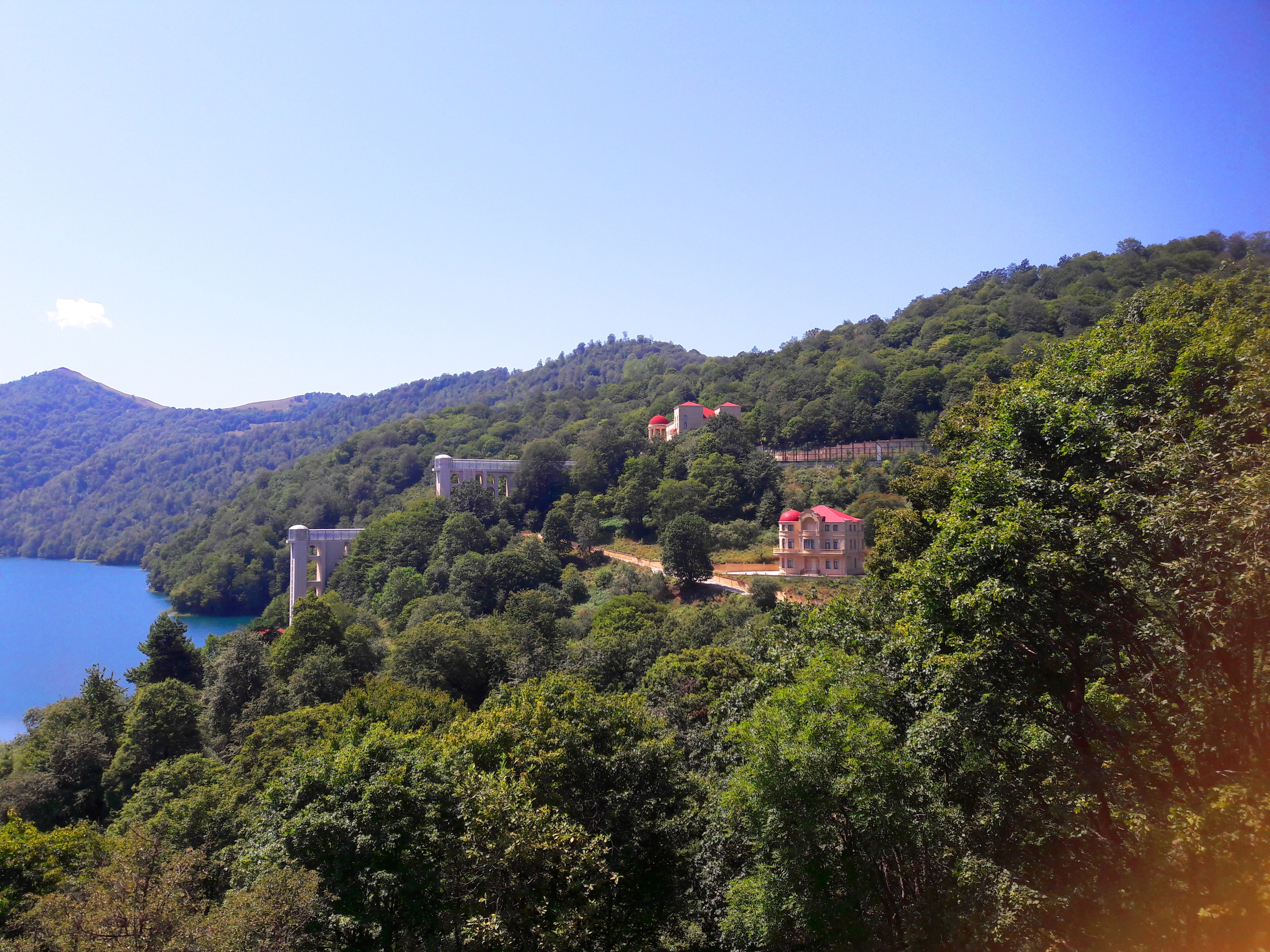

- Location within Azerbaijan
- Coordinates: 40°25′05″N 46°19′37″E
- Country: Azerbaijan
- District: Goygol
- Time zone: UTC+4 (AZT)
  - Summer (DST): UTC+5 (AZT)

Göygöl (also, Goygol) is a village situated on the banks of Lake Göygöl and forming part of the City of Ganja in Azerbaijan. Until the 1960s it was part of Khanlar District.
