= Jahangir bey Kazimbeyli =

Russian-Azerbaijani military officer

Jahangir Bey Kazimbeyli
- Cahangir bəy Kazimbəyli
- Kazimbeyli in 1940
- Born: March 15, 1885; Elisabethpol, Caucasus Viceroyalty Russian Empire
- Died: January 17, 1955 (aged 69); West Berlin, Federal Republic of Germany
- Burial place: Şehitlik Mosque
- Education: Ganja Men's Gymnasium
- Military career
- Allegiance: Imperial Russian Army (1902–1917); Azerbaijani Special Corps (1919–1920); Polish Armed Forces (1929–1939)
- Service years: 1902–1939
- Rank: Lieutenant colonel
- Commands: 3rd Ganja Infantry Regiment
- Conflicts: World War I; Eastern Front; Armenian–Azerbaijani War; 1920 Ganja revolt

Jahangir Bey Kazimbeyli (Azerbaijani: Cahangir bəy Kazimbəyli), also known as Jahangir Bey Kazimbeyov (Azerbaijani: Cahangir bəy Kazimbəyov; 15 March 1885 – 17 January 1955), was an Azerbaijani military officer who had served in the Russian, Azerbaijani and Polish armies. He is known as one of the leaders of the Ganja revolt in 1920.

== Early life ==
Jahangir Bey Kazimbeyli was born on 15 March 1885 in Elisabethpol (modern-day Ganja). He graduated from Ganja Men's Gymnasium.

== Military service ==
=== Russia ===
In 1902, Kazimbeyli entered military service in the Imperial Russian Army. Three years later, he was promoted to a cornet. Kazimbeyli fought in the Eastern Front of World War I during his military service in Russia. He completed his military career in the Imperial Russian Army in 1917 as a lieutenant colonel.

=== Azerbaijan ===
In January 1919, Kazimbeyli joined the ranks of the newly formed Azerbaijani Special Corps. On 14 January, by order of the Minister of War, General of Artillery, Samad Bey Mehmandarov, he was appointed the commander of the 3rd Ganja Infantry Regiment of the 1st Infantry Division as a lieutenant colonel. On 24 March 1920, by the order of the military department, Jahangir Bey Kazimbeyli was promoted to a colonel.

Kazimbeyli was one of the organizers of the Ganja revolt, directed against the newly established Soviet rule in Azerbaijan after Red Army's invasion of the country. He served as the commander of the Ganja garrison during the revolt. After the suppression of the revolt, Kazimbeyli fled to neighbouring Georgia with a small detachment under his command. From there, he emigrated to Turkey.

=== Poland ===
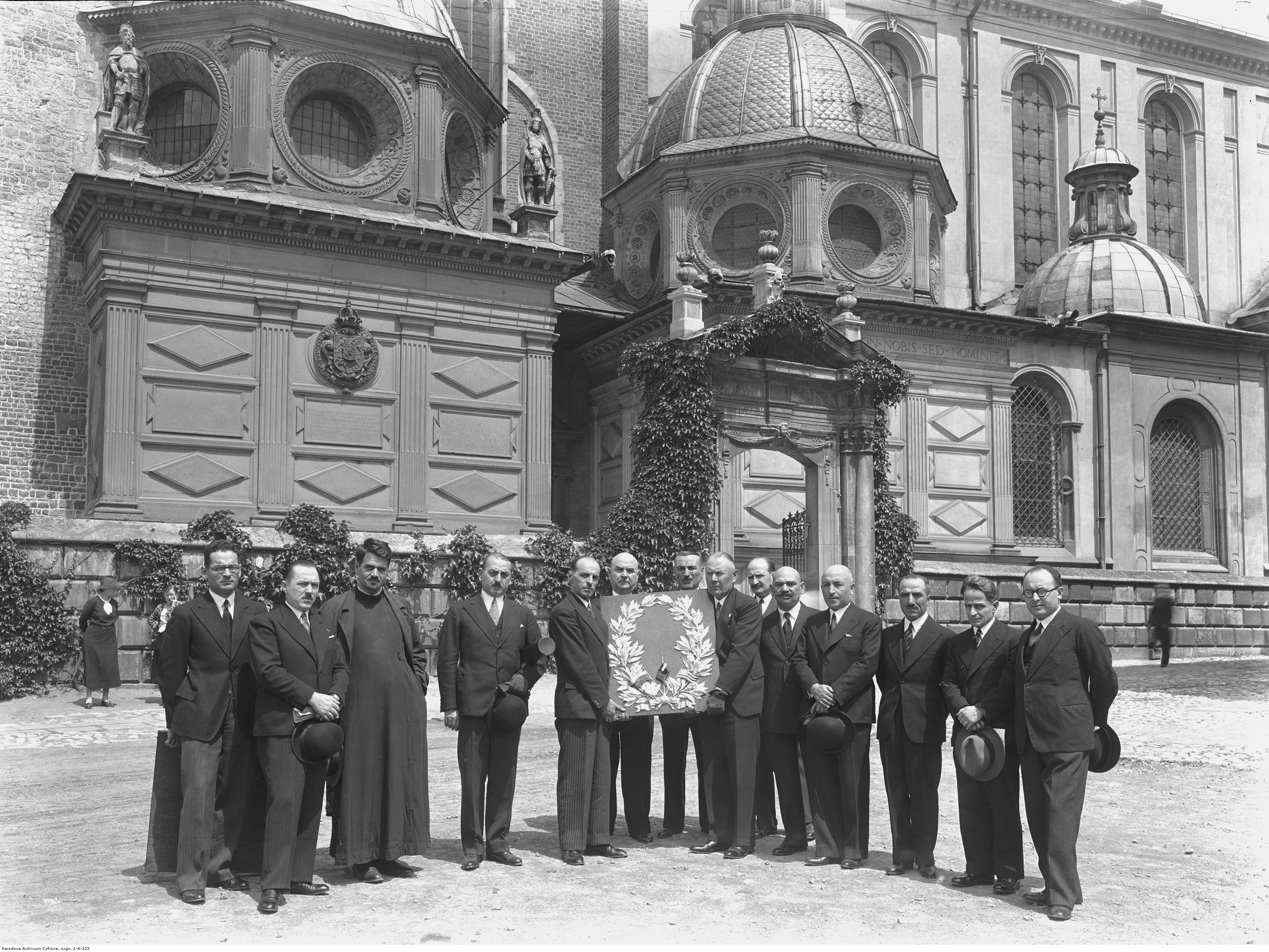
Jahangir Bek Kazim-Bek (4th from left) among Caucasian delegates before laying a wreath at the tomb of Marshal Jozef Pilsudski in Krakow, 1936

In 1923, Kazimbeyli moved to Poland and in the same year became a contract officer in the Polish Army. He took courses for students of the Polish Armed Forces, commanded a battalion and a regiment until the German invasion in 1939.

== Political career ==
Kazimbeyli became one of the active participants in the Azerbaijani émigré movement during World War II. It was he who was entrusted with the opening of the Azerbaijani National Congress, held in 1943, in Berlin.

== Later life and death ==
After the end of World War II, he moved to Italy and lived there for some time, and then settled in Turkey. He died in 1955, in Berlin, under unknown circumstances. He was buried in the Şehitlik Mosque in Berlin.
