= Nizami raion (Ganja) =

Nizami
- Raion
- Location within Azerbaijan
- Coordinates: 40°40′58″N 46°21′38″E
- Country: Azerbaijan
- City: Ganja

Area
  - Total: 39.25 km^{2} (15.15 sq mi)

Population
  - Total: 148,798
- Time zone: UTC+4 (AZT)
  - Summer (DST): UTC+5 (AZT)
- Website: http://nizami.ganja-ih.gov.az/index.html

Nizami Rayon (Azerbaijani: Nizami Rayonu) is a municipal district of the city of Ganja, the city of Azerbaijan. The district is named after poet Nizami Ganjavi. Its population is 152,000.

== Details ==
Nizami raion was established as Ganja raion of Kirovabad (former name of Ganja city) in November 1980 according to the decision of Supreme Soviet of Azerbaijan SSR. After the historic name of the city, Ganja was restored in 1989, this district was also renamed and since then it is called Nizami raion.

The total area of this district is 3,925 ha (9,700 acres), and its population is 152,000 (2018). The district consists of 2 administrative territorial units and 3 residential areas (Yeni Ganja, Mahrasa baghi and Gulustan).

There are 22 schools, 3 vocational schools, 20 kindergartens, Ganja State Drama Theatre, Ganja State Puppet Theatre, Ganja State Philharmonic Hall, Ganja State Chamber Orchestra, 3 music schools, Children's Art School, Children's Painting School, Heydar Aliyev Center, Ganja History Ethnography Museum, House Museum of Mir Jalal Pashayev, Memorial House-Museum of Nizami Ganjavi, Memorial-House Museum of Israfil Mammadov, Ganja State Art Gallery, Nizami cinema, Central Library and its 10 branches, as well as Children's Library, Ganja Olympic Sports Complex in Nizami district.

== Gallery ==
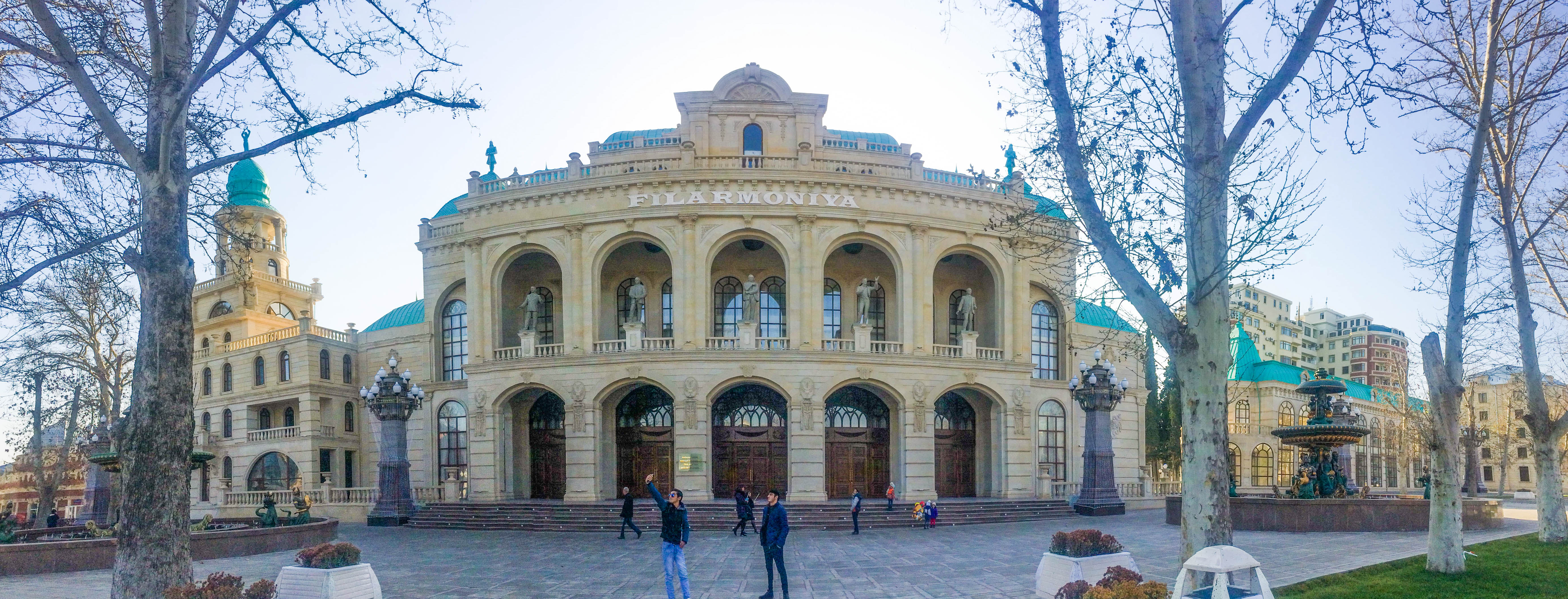
Ganja State Philharmonic Hall

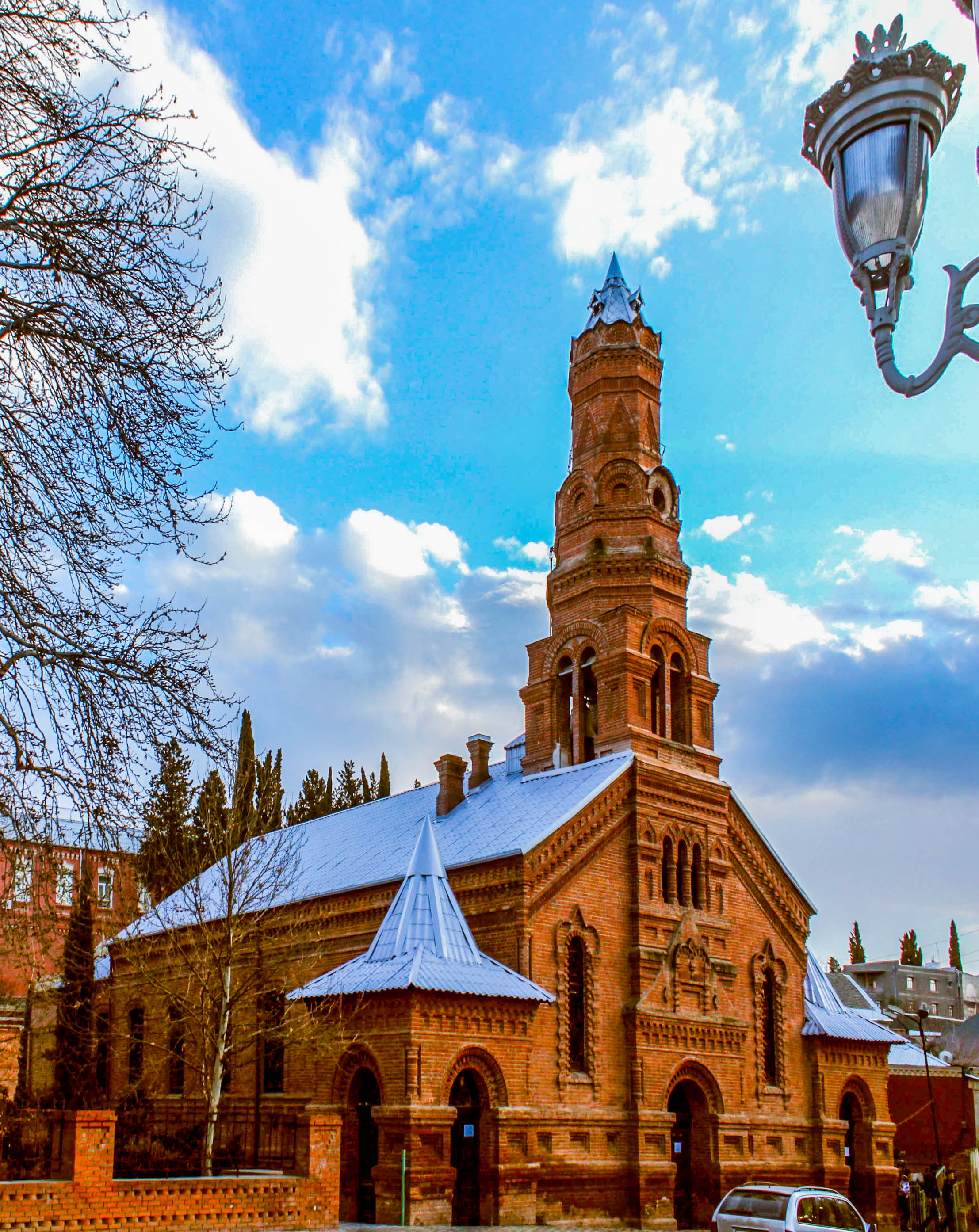
Ganja State Puppet Theatre

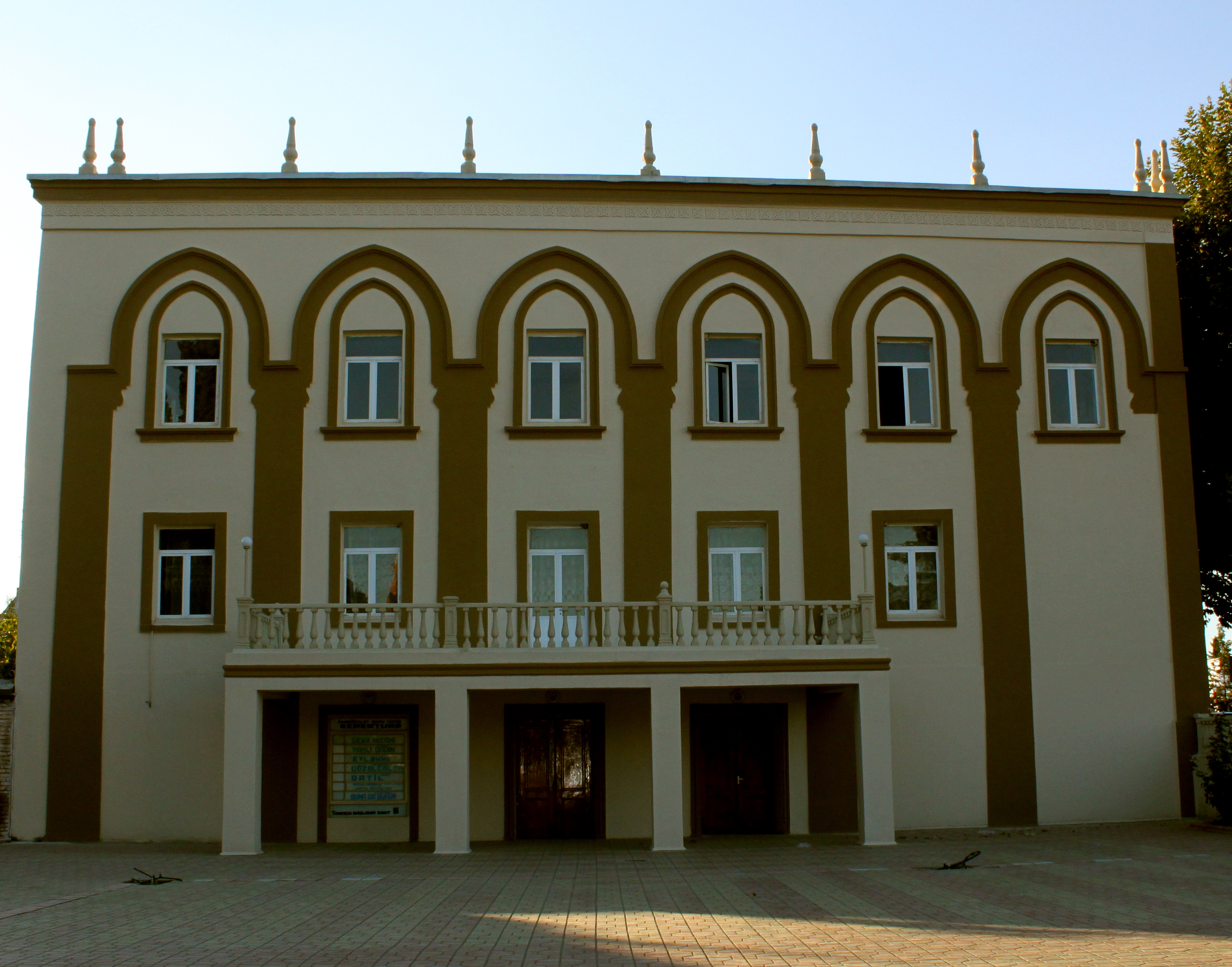
Ganja State Drama Theatre

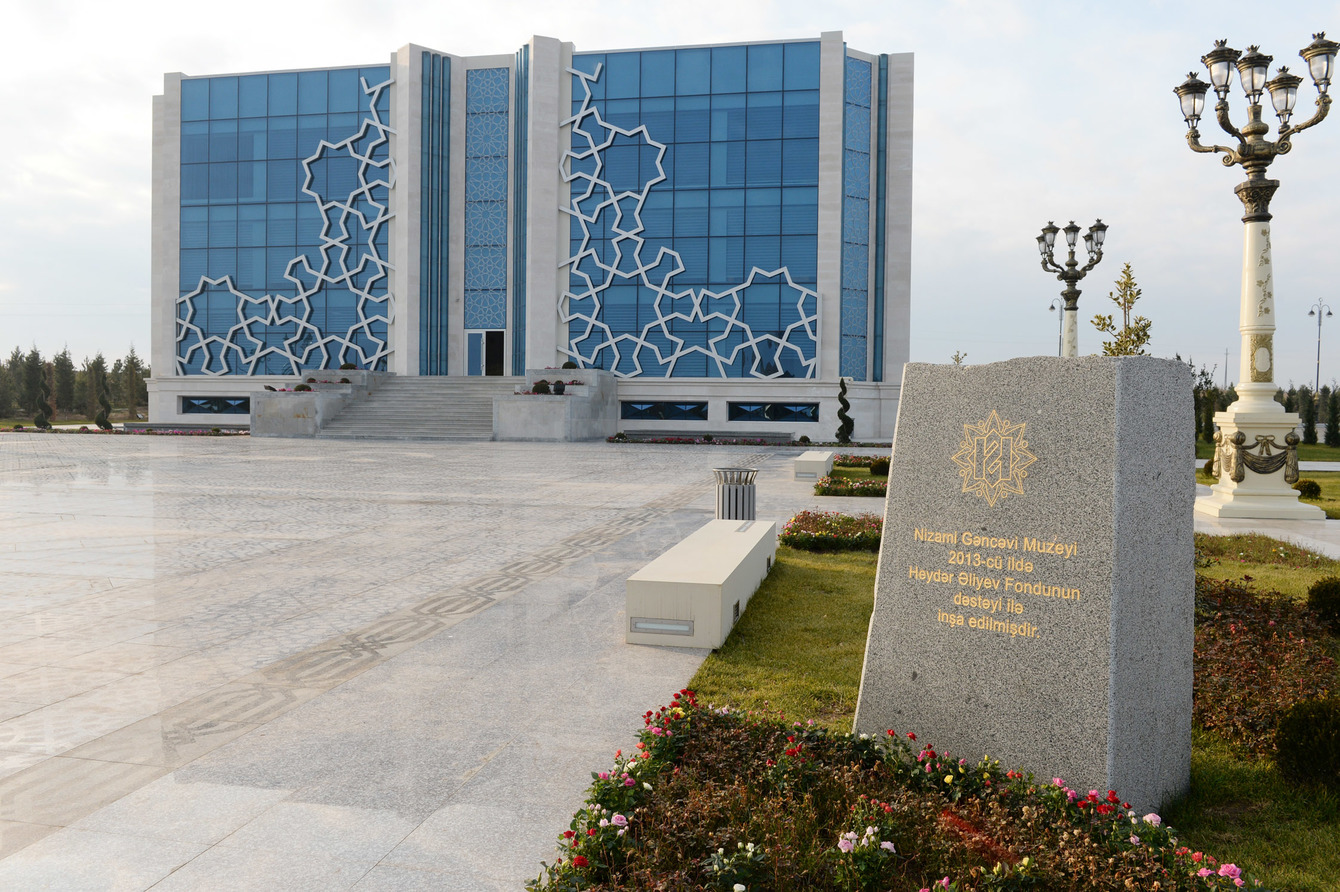
Nizami Ganjavi Museum

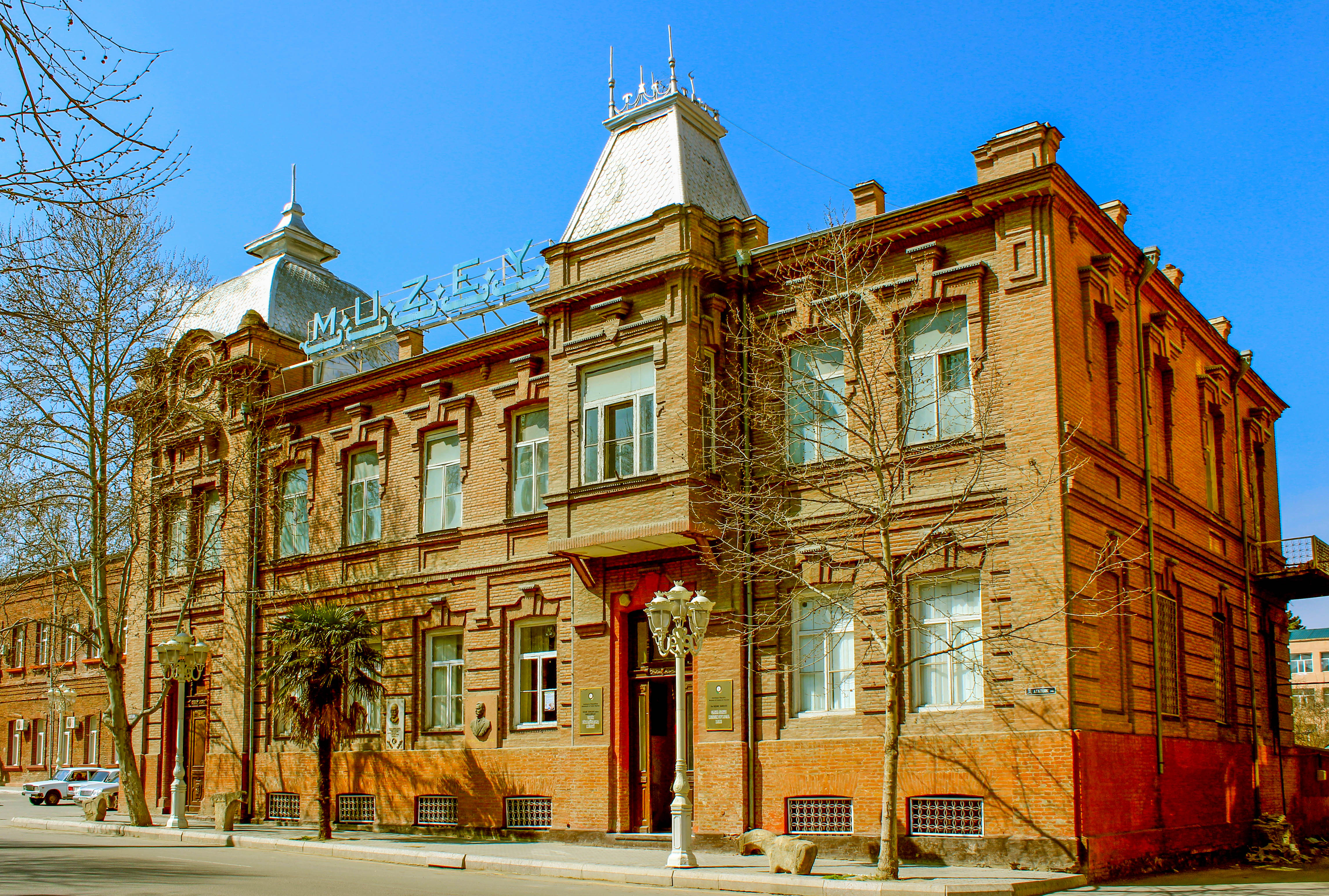
Ganja State History-Ethnography Museum

== See also ==
- Kapaz district
- Administrative divisions of Azerbaijan
