= 1920 Ganja revolt =

Azerbaijani uprising against Bolshevik power

Date	26–31 May 1920
Location	Ganja, Azerbaijan
Result	Bolshevik victory, revolt suppressed

Belligerents
(Azerbaijan) 1st Infantry Division (Azerbaijan) Gachags	(Russian Soviet Federative Socialist Republic) XI Army

Commanders and leaders
(Azerbaijan) Mahammad Mirza Qajar † (Azerbaijan) Javad bey Shikhlinski (Azerbaijan) Teymur bey Novruzov (Azerbaijan) Jahangir bey Kazimbeyli	(Russian Soviet Federative Socialist Republic) Mikhail Levandovsky (Russian Soviet Federative Socialist Republic) Mikhail Velikanov (Russian Soviet Federative Socialist Republic) Pyotr Kuryshko (Russian Soviet Federative Socialist Republic) Anastas Mikoyan (Russian Soviet Federative Socialist Republic) Alexander Shirmakher (WIA) (Russian Soviet Federative Socialist Republic) Mikhail Gorivatov † (Russian Soviet Federative Socialist Republic) Colonel Naumov †

Strength
10,000–12,000	Unknown

Casualties and losses
Unknown	Unknown

The 1920 Ganja revolt (Azerbaijani: Gəncə üsyanı) was a popular uprising against the Soviet occupation that took place in Ganja on 26 to 31 May 1920. The goal of the uprising was to overthrow the Soviet government in Azerbaijan. This was the largest rebellion against Soviet rule in Azerbaijan in the 20th century, and caused the most losses. The organizers and leading force of the uprising were officers of the army of the former Azerbaijan Democratic Republic.

The 1st Infantry Division of the Azerbaijan Army, the units of the 3rd Ganja Regiment in the city, the training team of the 3rd Sheki Cavalry Regiment, an artillery battery, and the personnel of the commandant's unit subordinated to the divisional headquarters were mainly involved in the organisation of the uprising. Qachaq Gambar, Sari Alakbar, Qachaq Gasim Kolakhani, Qachaq Mikayil and others also participated in the Ganja uprising with their armed men. The armies of the surrounding villages joined the rebellion army. Their number was more than 10 thousand people.On the eve of the uprising, units of the 20th infantry division of the 11th Red Army took up positions in and around the city. The 178th and 180th infantry regiments of the division were in the Armenian neighbourhood of the city, and the communications battalion and commandant unit of the 3rd brigade were in the Azerbaijani part of the city. The 40th Cavalry Brigade was stationed around the village of Zurnabad. On 25 May, the II regiment of the Taman Cavalry Brigade was also brought to Ganja.

During the uprising that started on the night of 25–26 May, the rebels quickly took control of the important facilities of the city, the Red Army units in the Azerbaijani part. The military warehouse, the city prison, the railway station, the building of the emergency commissariat was also captured. On 28 May, the leaders of the Ganja uprising and the city community gathered at the district court building to celebrate the second anniversary of the declaration of Azerbaijan's independence.

On 29 May, the Bolshevik attack on the rebels ended in failure. The Bolshevik forces were unable to fulfill their task in the attack carried out from several directions. On the contrary, the counterattacks by the rebels put the Bolshevik forces in a difficult position. Later, the XI Red Army command brought additional forces to Ganja. Before the start of the next battles on 30 May, the 11th Red Army had 5 infantry regiments, 6 cavalry regiments, 7 separate units and detachments, 57 cannons and 2 armoured vehicles in Ganja. Most of these forces were deployed to the north of the city, and from there the main attack began on 31 May. Rebels who could not leave the city, as well as civilians, were surrounded and shot en masse. After the suppression of the rebellion, 12 generals, 27 colonels and lieutenant colonels, 46 captains, staff captains, 12 generals, 27 colonels and lieutenant colonels, 46 captains, staff captains of the Azerbaijani army, along with prominent figures such as Major-General Muhammad Mirza Qajar, Qachaq Gambar, lawyer Ismayil Khan Ziyadkhanov, writer Firidun Bey Kocherli, engineer Abuzar Bey Rzayev and teacher Mirza Abbas Abbaszadeh, lieutenants and second lieutenants, 146 ensigns and sub-ensigns, and 267 other military personnel were shot by the Bolsheviks.

== The situation before the uprising ==
=== April Invasion ===
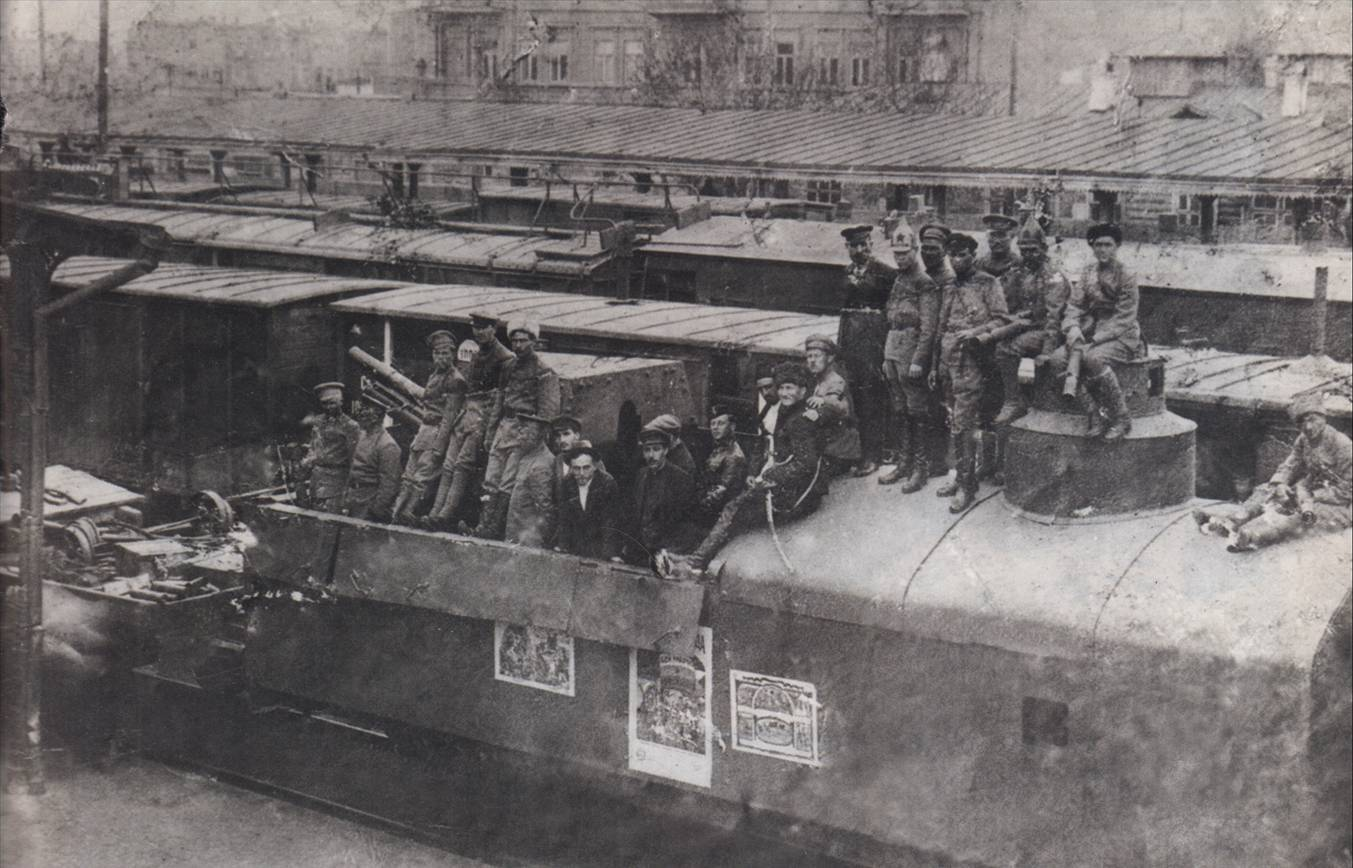
The arrival of the armoured train of the XI Red Army in Baku on 28 April 1920. In the photo, Mikhail Yefremov, Anastas Mikoyan, Gazanfar Musabayov, Simon Ter-Petrosyan and others are depicted on the III International train

On 21 and 23 April 1920, the Revolutionary Military Council of the Caucasian Front, under the leadership of S.G.Ordzhonikidze, ordered the XI Red Army to cross the border of Azerbaijan on 27 April and occupy the entire territory. On 26 April, the XI Red Army headquarters moved to Derbend to lead the offensive. The attack of the XI Army began at 12 o'clock on the night of 26–27 April. 70,000 XI Red Army, the "III International" in front, 3 more armoured trains and 300 infantrymen, crossed the bridge over the Samur River. Among the leaders of this troop were Anastas Mikoyan and Gazanfar Musabeyov.

On the same day, the ACP Ganja District Committee formed the Revolutionary Committee of Gubernia after hearing about the events in Baku. In the evening of the next day, Governor Khudadat Bey Rafibeyli signed the act on the transfer of power to the Revolutionary Committee in the entire Ganja Governorate. Ganja Revolutionary Committee consisted of chairman Ibrahim Aliyev, deputy Farhad Aliyev, Vakilov, Sultanov and Eminbeyov.

During the change of government in Ganja governorate, armoured trains started moving from Baku to Ganja. As they approached the city, they engaged in a major battle with bands of Musavatists who tried to block their path. On 1 May, Soviet armored trains and landing companies of the 28th Infantry Division captured the Ganja station and the railway district of the city. The next day, the regiments of the II Cavalry Corps and the Taman Cavalry Division arrived Ganja and occupied the city as well as its subordinate districts.

After the telegram sent by Lenin to the leadership of Soviet Azerbaijan on 5 May, which was regarded as the recognition of Soviet Azerbaijan as a new state, a telegram signed by Ibrahim Aliyev, the chairman of the Revolutionary Committee of Gubernia, arrived from the Ganja Revolutionary Committee on 8 May. In this telegram, the recognition of the Azerbaijan Soviet Socialist Republic by the RSFSR was welcomed by Ganja governorate and the telegram expressed readiness to fight mercilessly against those who exploit the working class of the whole world. At the same time, during the Ganja uprising, many villagers did not even know about the sovietization of the country.

=== Policy towards the ADP Army ===
On 28 April, according to the decree of the Azerbaijan Revolutionary Committee, the People's Commissariat for Military and Naval Affairs was established and Chingiz Yildirim was appointed as its first commissioner. The next day, the Azerbaijan Revolutionary Committee appealed to the soldiers of the Azerbaijani army, urging them to help the Red Army in the fight for the Soviet government. On the same day, a decision was made to immediately subordinate the Azerbaijani army to the XI Red Army and re-form it on the basis of the Workers-Peasants' Red Army while keeping the name of Azerbaijan for the appropriate number and units of army. The newly formed army was initially (in May) the successor of the former ADR army in terms of its personnel and equipment, only its name was changed and it was called the Red Army. Soldiers and officers were already serving in the army under the new government. On the 30th of the month, Chingiz Yıldırım appointed the former Deputy Minister of Defense Aliaga Shikhlinski as his temporary assistant.

They began to appoint members of the Communist Party of Azerbaijan to the former army units in order to concentrate the political leadership in their hands. According to the recommendation of the Azerbaijan Revolutionary Committee (ARC) and by order of the People's Commissar for Military and Naval Affairs of the Azerbaijan Soviet Republic, Ahmad Rzayev was appointed as the commissar of the military units located in Ganja on 4 May. On 7 May, the ARC made a decision to subordinate the renamed army and navy to the 11th Red Army and the Volga-Caspian military fleet "in terms of operational, administrative, organizational and all types of supplies". Subordinating parts of the former ADR army to the XI Red Army was not only a political activity. It was important to increase the personnel of the XI Red Army, which entered the Caucasus.

In order to implement this, according to the decision made on 11 May by the commander of the XI Red Army, Mikhail Levandovsky, member of the Revolutionary Military Council, Konstantin Mekhonoshi, and chief of staff, Alexander Remezov, the Azerbaijani units located in the Ganja district should be subordinated to the commander of the 32nd division, The inspectors of the 11th Red Army were instructed to re-form the Azerbaijani units, as well as to draw up a plan to create the 1 st United Azerbaijan worker-peasant red Soviet rifle division. On that day, Chingiz Yıldırım wrote:

The Revolutionary Military Council of the XI Red Army and the Military-Naval Commissariat of the Azerbaijan Soviet Republic were instructed to re-form the Azerbaijani army on the basis of the Workers and Peasants' Red Army. The re-formation of the fleet should be carried out together with the command of the Caspian Red Fleet. The mobilization and formation of units is conducted by the Military-Naval Commissariat of the Azerbaijan Soviet Republic.

During the reformations, units of the former Azerbaijani army were reorganised. According to the decision by the Military and Naval Commissar of the Soviet Republic of Azerbaijan dated 16 May, the name of the 3rd Ganja Infantry Regiment was changed to the 3rd Azerbaijan Workers and Peasants' Red Rifle Regiment, and the 1 st Infantry Division (which later revolted) was merged with the 2nd Infantry Division and the name was changed to the 1 st Workers and Peasants' Red Rifle Brigade. The 1 st Workers' and Peasants' Red Rifle Brigade became a part of the 1 st Azerbaijan Workers' and Peasants' Red Division. (The headquarters of the 1 st infantry division took the name of the Azerbaijan Workers and Peasants' United Division). Almost at the same time, by the decision of the Military-Naval Commissioner of the Soviet Republic of Azerbaijan, the name of the Military School of the Azerbaijan Democratic Republic was changed to the Workers-Peasants' Red Command Courses. The task of reshaping the training units was assigned to General Aliagha Shikhlinski, a former army officer who at that time was the assistant to the Naval Commissar of the Azerbaijan Soviet Republic: "The reshaping of the training units should be carried out according to the instructions of my deputy Aliagha Shikhlinsky".

=== Military and political situation ===
On 10 May, the Bolshevik uprising began and was suppressed by the Armenian government. Suppression was also helped by England and the Dashnaks were offered weapons worth 1 million pounds sterling, which they accepted on 19 May. Although the uprising was suppressed, an armed struggle against the government broke out in a number of regions of Armenia. On 18 May, the government of Soviet Azerbaijan even sent 17 wagons of food and 5 million rubles to the rebelling Shamshadin region. Nevertheless, after long battles, the Armenian insurgents, numbering 1600 people, crossed the Azerbaijani border. In Soviet Azerbaijan, the Armenian Red Insurgent Regiment (1 st Kazakh Insurgent Regiment) was formed from them.

The May uprising of the Bolsheviks in Armenia coincided with the period when the 32nd Rifle Division of the XI Red Army crossed the border of the Kazakh province with Armenia. Armenian detachments withdrew from Karabakh under the pressure of the Red Army. Armenian units were also retreating from Karabakh under the pressure of the Red Army. On 18 May, the commander of the 32nd infantry division, Steiger, received an order from the XI Red Army that "all parts of the division should be concentrated around Shusha by May 25 and strong detachments should be sent in the direction of Nakhchivan - Julfa - Ordubad." The goal here was to capture those territories. According to the order, on 20 May, the first brigade of the XX division was sent from Ganja to Shusha along the Yelenendorf-Chaykend-Tartar-Khankendi route. At the same time, the division's second brigade and headquarters remained in Ganja. On 20 May, rebels and people's militia units, with the help of Azerbaijan SSR, captured Caravanserai, which was the border region of Armenia with Azerbaijan. The next day, Red Army units also entered here. However, the Ganja and Zagatala uprisings, as well as the conflicts in Zangezur and Karabakh, diverted the forces of the XI Red Army from some targets.

== Status of the Parties ==
=== Former Azerbaijani army ===
At the time of the uprising, the 1 st Azerbaijani infantry division of the ADR had not yet been re-formed in the Soviet way. This division, with a total number of 1800 people, consisted of the III Ganja Rifle Regiment, the training detachment of the III Sheki Cavalry Regiment, an artillery battery and the commandant team of the divisional headquarters. The leadership of the division was not changed either. For example, Major General Amir Kazim Mirza was the head of supply of the Govanli-Qajar division and was also the commandant of the city until 20 May.

=== XI Red Army ===
The 178th and 180th infantry regiments of the 20th division were stationed in the south-eastern part of Ganja where Armenians lived, and the personnel of the commandant unit of the Taman Cavalry Brigade and the communication battalion were located in the northwestern part of Ganja, i.e. where the Turks (Azerbaijanis) lived. The III brigade commanded by Alexander Schirmacher consisted of 2,000 personnel, 30 machine guns and one light artillery division.

The 20th Cavalry Brigade, located in the village of Zurnabad, 20 km southwest of Ganja, had 450 personnel, one cavalry battery and 8 machine guns. The division's artillery headquarters and a two-gun battery were located in the German colony Yelenendorf, located 5-6 km south of Ganja. On 25 May, the II regiment of the Taman Cavalry Brigade was also sent to Ganja.

== History ==
Regarding the dates of the beginning and end of the uprising, there is no consensus in the sources. Georgian historian Giorgi Mamulia and Ramiz Abutalibov wrote the book "Odlar yurdu", here the date of the start of the uprising was indicated as 22 May. Journalist and researcher K. Bayramov indicated that in most documents of the Bolsheviks, the date of the beginning of the uprising üas 25 May, and the date of the final suppression of the uprising was 31 May. At the same time, the report of the People's Commissar of Internal Affairs indicates that the uprising lasted until 30 May, and according to Linchevsky, a participant in the suppression of the uprising and the evenings of reminiscences in 1937, the city was "cleared of Musavatists" on the night of 1–2 June. At the same time, Linchevsky believed that the disarmament from which the uprising began took place on the night of 25–26 May.

Qachaq Mammadgasim from Samukh, the leader of the Qachaq group, and Jahangir Bey Kazimbeyli, one of the organisers of the uprising, mentioned in their memoirs that the uprising began on 24 May. According to Kazimbayli, the uprising was suppressed on the night of 3–4 June. This date was also mentioned in his letter to Khanlar Bayramov by Zahid Khan Khoyski, a participant in the uprising and later emigrant. In his work, Khanlar Bayramov was based on the dates mentioned by the participants of the uprising.

There are also differences of opinion regarding the starting time of the uprising. According to the memoirs of Jahangir Bey Kazimbeyli, the disarmament of the Bolsheviks began at 20:00 and ended at 23:00. In the Soviet literature, it was mentioned that the uprising started at 3 o'clock in the night, and the townspeople joined the uprising from 5 o'clock in the morning.

In the encyclopaedia "Civil war and military intervention in the USSR" published in 1983, the events were explained from 26 May, and the suppression of the rebellion was recorded as 31 May. In the encyclopaedia "Revolution and Civil War in Russia: 1917-1923", published in Russia in 2008, it is mentioned that the uprising in Ganja took place on 25–31 May. Almost the same dates can be found in the book written by the British historian Jonathan Smele. He also noted that the uprising began on the night of 25–26 May, and on 31 May, the Red Guards managed to concentrate the main forces that suppressed the uprising in Ganja.

Nagi Bey Sheykhzamanli, who was the head of the counter-revolution organisation during the Azerbaijan Democratic Republic, also noted in his memoirs that the uprising lasted for 9 days.

=== Preparation ===
A member of Central Committee of the ACP (b), Azrevkom and the Revolutionary Military Council of the Caucasian Front Sergo Ordzhonikidze received a report from the Turkish communist Mustafa Subhi. In this document, under the title "Report on the results of the visit to Ganja", it was reported about a secret meeting that took place in the estate of Shahmalinsky, located in Samukh, two weeks before the uprising. Former Prime Minister Nasib Bey Yusifbeyli, Governor General of Gazakh Province Amiraslan Khan Khoyski, former Minister of Internal Affairs Mustafa Bey Vakilov, Jahangir Bey Kazimbeyli and Turkish General Nuru Pasha participated in this meeting. The purpose of their secret meeting was to prepare for the uprising.

On 23 May, the new head of one of the divisions (According to Kadishev, the Azerbaijani division, and according to Darabadi, the XX division) came to the city from the headquarters of the XI Army together with the command staff. The events that provoked the Azerbaijani units to revolt, the radical change of the division's leadership and the plans for the renewal of its personnel. On that day, a secret meeting was organised in the cemetery. At the meeting attended by the officers of the former army, General Mohammad Mirza Qajar declares the importance of revolt. Joint headquarters and operative groups were created here.

In advance, the rebels organised secret weapons depots in the city. Armed groups of local residents retreated to the surrounding villages. A group of soldiers under the leadership of the head of the military garrison, Major General Javad Bey Shikhlinski and the commander of the Ganja Infantry Regiment, Colonel Jahangir Bey Kazimbeyli, drew up an operational plan of the uprising. The former commandant of Ganja, Major General Muhammad Mirza Qajar, was assigned to build defensive fortifications around the city. According to Jahangir Bey's memoirs, the leaders of the rebellion planned to use the unexpected attack to quickly disarm the Red Guards and unite with the Azerbaijani army units fighting the Armenians in Karabakh and the Georgian army to liberate the country.

The III Sheki Cavalry Regiment, commanded by Colonel Tokayev, was located in Aghdam and Tartar. There was a conflict between the soldiers of the Sheki Cavalry Regiment and the 282nd Regiment of the XI Red Army located in the same place just before the Ganja Uprising. Attempts by the Red Army soldiers to steal the horses of the Sheki Cavalry Regiment were responded with shooting by the Azerbaijani units, which led to the conflict. As a result, on 21 May, the units of the III Sheki Cavalry Regiment located in Tartar and the local population revolted. According to Soviet sources, during the uprising, 80 members of the Red Army forces, including the regimental commander Naumov, were killed by the rebels. However, the number of Red Army soldiers and the appeals by the ASSR People's Commissar for Naval Affairs, Chingiz Yıldırım and the ASSR People's Education Commissar Dadash Bunyadzade to tolerate the new government caused the uprising to calm down. Relying on the help of the 3rd Sheki Cavalry Regiment, the organisers of the Ganja Uprising sent two officers to Aghdam and Tartar regions to meet with the regiment commander and inform about the upcoming uprising. Eristov, Sumbatov and Israfil Bey Yadigarov were sent to Georgia to establish contact with the Georgian army.

Rumors circulated in teahouses and local barracks that Christians would be given new Red Army uniforms but not Muslims. Opinions such as "Russians want to restore their power over Muslims" spread among people and created a basis for rebellion.

On the eve of the uprising, armed groups under the leadership of Qachaq Gambar and Sari Alakbar gathered in the village of Nuzgar, located west of Ganja. Since Jahangir Bey Kazimbeyli's house was always under surveillance, he held those secret meetings either in Baghmanlar on the outskirts of Ganja or in the villages on the banks of Kura. The last meeting was held on 24 May around 4 o'clock in Baghmanlar. In this meeting, the places and methods of fighting were determined. After a certain signal, the qachaq groups were supposed to attack from Baghmanlar, cross the Ganja river and attack the Red Army unit located in the Armenian part of the city. One of the Tabors, with the help of qachaqs, was assigned to surround the area where the red division was located and force them to surrender. The other battalion was assigned to capture the most important state facilities such as the post office, telegraph, and military warehouses and to disarm the Sharia Regiment. The operative document of the XI Red Army dated 1 June stated that:

The next actions of the rebels, after liberating the city, were in the direction of gaining access to the railway and cutting off the connection between Baku and Aghstafa. They wanted to cut off the connection of Baku with the delegation that was conducting peace negotiations with the Georgian delegation at the Poylu station.

According to the Great Soviet Encyclopedia, the armed uprising was organised by members of the Musavat Party.

=== Start ===
The command of the 11th Red Army considered the main issue of rebuilding and "redding" the army units formed during the ADR era in order to prevent the possibility of rebellion and armed resistance against the Soviet regime within the republic. After the leadership of the military ministry was changed, the commanders of divisions and units began to be changed. On 20 May, the new leadership team of the 1 st Azerbaijan Division, headquartered in Ganja, arrived in the city and began their duties. National army officers were to be replaced by "red" soldiers loyal to the new regime.

The city commandant found out about it 2-3 hours before the start of the uprising, and therefore they decided to remove the Azerbaijani soldiers on guard duty and surround their barracks. But they can deliver this warning only to the XX infantry division. Museyib Shahbazov wrote:

The uprising began on the night of 24–25 May 1920. In a short time, the important facilities of the city, the Red Army units in the neighbourhoods inhabited by Azerbaijanis were taken under control. The military warehouse, the central prison, the railway station, the building of the emergency commissariat was captured.

The uprising began on the night of 24-25 May 1920. In a short time, the important facilities of the city, the Red Army units in the neighborhoods inhabited by Azerbaijanis were taken under control. The military warehouse, the central prison, the railway station, the building of the emergency commissariat was captured.

On 3 June 1920, the report sent to Baku by the People's Commissariat of Internal Affairs stated:

On May 18, the extraordinary commissar Hamid Sultanov arrived in Ganja with 6 instructors. On May 25, at 3 o'clock in the night, an uprising began after an artillery fire. At 5 o'clock in the morning, when the instructors and state employees of the Revolutionary Committee went out on the street, they were arrested and put in prison. At that time, a fierce struggle was going on in the city. The rebels were led by General Shikhlinski, Colonel Kazimbeyli, Prince Muhammad Mirza, Khoyski brothers, well-known Gambar and Alakbar, and soldiers of the 3rd Ganja Regiment.

==== Joining of other forces ====
As soon as the uprising began, the divisional commander of the III Sheki cavalry regiment, lieutenant colonel Ehsan Khan Nakhchivanski went to the headquarters of the Red Army in Yevlakh to get information about the incident. But he was killed as soon as he reached the headquarters. His death gave impetus to the participation of the Sheki III Cavalry Regiment in the rebellion.

The III regiment of the Red Army, consisting entirely of Azerbaijanis, also joined the rebels. Later, it was mentioned in a number of sources that the workers of the city and railway militia also joined the rebels en masse. In addition, many representatives of the local authoritiesm of the Soviet government also chose the side of the rebels, as a result of which the XI Red Army lost confidence in the local authorities.

The number of soldiers who rebelled was about 2,000. Later, thanks to the volunteers formed from the city population, the number of rebels reached 10-12 thousand people. That same night, the clergy called Muslims to jihad against the Bolshevik government.

Ganja Armenians sided with the Bolsheviks from the first day of the uprising. As Behbud Shahtakhtinsky wrote to Lenin, they thought that if the rebels succeeded, they would kill them together with the Bolsheviks. Red Army soldiers were also assisted by German peasants from Yelenendorf. According to the researcher journalist Khanlar Bayramov, there were Mensheviks, White Guardsmen, Germans and Georgians among the rebels. Thus, the infantry detachments of the rebels were headed by Colonel Krause, and the artillery detachments by the supporter of Denikin, Colonel Nikolayev.

==== Arrest of Bolsheviks ====
The rebels entered the Armenian part of the city and killed Kolesnikov, one of the commanders of the Red Army, and several communist Muslims. In addition, the rebels arrested many staff members and Red Army soldiers and officers, including Alexander Schirmacher, who was a former staff captain of the tsarist army and the commander of the III brigade at the time of the uprising. Bala Efendiyev, the deputy chairman of the Revolution Committee of Ganja, was also arrested and put in prison. According to S. Levcheski's memoirs, about 1,200 Red Army soldiers were imprisoned. In addition, the people who were previously arrested by the Bolsheviks were released from prison, and confiscated weapons were distributed to the local population. Museyib Shahbazov wrote in his memoirs about the arrests and attitude towards members of the Red Army:

Arrests and pressures began against the employees of the military establishments located in the Muslim part of Ganja and the members of the Red Army. Soon the Ganja prison was filled with prisoners, and the unbearable torture of the captured Red Army members began here. There was almost no drinking water and we satiated our thirst with water from the ponds. For a week 3/8 of a pound of bread per person was given, valuables were confiscated, prisoners who managed to hide money gave the rebels 1000 rubles for a pound of bread.

Azerbaijani emigrant officer Asgar Kangerlinski mentioned another idea in his memoirs. He stated in his memoirs that the rebels did not even kill a disarmed member of the Red Army.

=== The following days ===
The uprisings that started in the regions and especially in Ganja posed a serious threat to the newly established Bolshevik government. The top-secret operative directive of the XI Red Army, sent from Baku on 26 May, ordered to prepare for a possible general uprising and brutally suppress it.

On 26 May, the attack of the Bolsheviks and Armenian units began from the Yelenendorf (south), but the rebels stopped the enemy's attack with a counterattack and caused them to suffer losses. On the same day, the Bolsheviks tried to attack from the Shamkir, but the rebels prevented this attack with a machine gun and artillery fire and caused the enemy to suffer heavy losses. At 5 o'clock, the Bolsheviks began to shell the city and the positions of the rebels with artillery fire. But the rebels silenced them with return fire. On that day, the news spread that General Mohammad Qajar was ill.

The 20th Cavalry Brigade, regrouping the units, captured the southwest of the city on 27 May to prevent the rebels from going to the mountains. A regiment of the brigade and a platoon of horse artillery were assigned to cross Ganja from the north and east, capture the northwestern suburbs of the city and isolate the rebels. At this time, the rebels concentrated all their forces in the north of the city and tried to capture the railway station again. But all their attempts failed. They dug trenches in vineyards and melons along the highway. An armoured train from Baku began to help the XX cavalry regiment and horse artillery platoon, which had been ordered to attack the rebels. As a result, the rebels were again removed from the station. Despite this, the artillery of the rebels managed to destroy one of the bridges located in the west of Ganja, and this cut off the Red Army's communication with the Gazakh for a while. During the day, the rebels managed to repulse 7 attacks by the Bolsheviks who tried to capture the city. Unable to capture the city, the Bolsheviks shelled the city with artillery fire throughout the day.

In accordance with the decree of the Communist Party of Azerbaijan and the Revolutionary Committee of Azerbaijan, the Workers and Peasants' Defense Council of Azerbaijan, which included Nariman Narimanov, Mirza Davud Huseynov and others, was established. On 28 May, the newspaper "Izvestiya Vremennogo Revolyutsionnogo Komiteta Azerbaijan" published this decree of the Revolutionary Committee of Azerbaijan. The following was written in the newspaper:

Azerbaijan's counter-revolution brought its criminal and bloody claws to the head of the worker-peasant government. The young Soviet Republic was attacked by robbers and angry mobs. Considering the threat to the worker-peasant revolution, the Provisional Revolutionary Committee of the Azerbaijan Soviet Socialist Republic, the Central Communist Party of Azerbaijan with the consent of his party, it was decided to create the Workers and Peasants' Defense Council of Azerbaijan, giving it all broad powers in order to quickly cancel the counter-revolution.

On 29 May, the Central Committee of the ACP addressed all the workers, peasants and Bolsheviks of Azerbaijan in the following content:

The revolution is in danger! The bourgeois class is still strong, it is not disarmed...Each one of you rise up to protect your interests, to protect the Soviet government!

Units of the Red Army formed in Azerbaijan were also involved in suppressing the rebellion. An international detachment of 200 people was formed to help the Red Army units in Chardagli village, located in Ganja province.

Despite the intense fighting, the rebels decided to celebrate the second anniversary of the declaration of the Azerbaijan Democratic Republic on 28 May. On that day, at 8 o'clock in the morning, influential people of the city, representatives of the organisers of the Ganja uprising, and Sheikh-ul-Islam gathered in the district court, celebrated the anniversary of Azerbaijan's independence and shared their views on the situation in the city. The participants of the ceremony called everyone to fight until the end. About this event, Jahangir Bey Kazimbeyli wrote in his memoirs:

Everyone was calling for a fight to the end. Let them win over us, but let the enemy achieve his victory over hundreds and thousands of his own dead bodies. Let 28 May be written in our history not only as the day when our independence was declared, but also as a day of great sacrifices for the sake of the Motherland. May the enemy face a heavy, merciless, life-and-death struggle on 28 May. Worthy resistance on 28 May will be a symbol of the greatness of our will, a symbol of our moral victory.

The ХІ Army Command further strengthened its military power in the city. By the order signed on 28 May, the 179th regiment and the cavalry brigade of the 20th infantry division were brought to Ganja. On the same day, the 18th Cavalry Division, which was in the Zagatala region, was also brought to Ganja. This division was operationally subordinated to the 20th infantry division. Among the new forces brought to the city was a howitzer division. The number of armoured trains here was increased to 4. Aviation units located in Baku were also involved in suppressing the rebellion. For this purpose, the 18th and 33rd air detachments of the 2nd Division were deployed in Yevlakh. The planes were initially planned to be deployed around Ganja. However, due to the fact that many of the members of the personnel of the 33rd detachment contracted malaria in Ganja, that detachment was released from the combat mission, and the other two detachments were deployed around Yevlakh.

A Soviet military group was formed that was both quantitatively and qualitatively superior to the armed forces that rebelled in Ganja. This group was tasked with suppressing the uprising in Ganja quickly and restoring Soviet power in the city. The 20th infantry division was supposed to surround the southern and southwestern part of the city, starting from the Ganja river. The 20th Cavalry Brigade was supposed to attack from the west and northwest of the city. The direction of attack of the 178th and 179th infantry regiments should be towards the north and northwest direction of the city. The 180th infantry regiment and units located in the Armenian part of the city were assigned to attack from the east of the city, and the cavalry from the south and southwest to attack the part of Ganja inhabited by Azerbaijanis. In order to achieve order in the activities of the units involved in the attack, all cavalry forces were subordinated to the commander of the 18th cavalry division, the units and divisions located in the Armenian part of the city were subordinated to the newly appointed commander of the Azerbaijani division, and the forces in the north were subordinated to the commander of the 20th division.

Jahangir Bey Kazimbayli, who received the news that there would be a serious attack from the Shamkir early in the morning, saw that the situation was really tense after intelligence with the German-born colonel Hauzen, and concentrated the main forces in the western direction. The Azerbaijani units led by Kazimbeyli, Hausen and Captain Mirizade allowed the 18th Cavalry Division of the Bolsheviks to move 600 meters forward and were able to defeat them with the help of 22 machine guns and 6 cannons. According to Kazimzade's memoirs, the battlefield was full of dead and wounded Bolsheviks.

At 2 o'clock in the day, information was received about the attack of the Bolsheviks from the Yelenendorf direction. An additional machine gun unit and a partisan unit were sent to help the infantry battalion that had taken a position in that direction. As a result of the joint efforts of Tabor and the partisans, this attack attempt of the Armenian-Bolshevik detachment was prevented. On 28 May, the Bolshevik forces, which could not enter the city, started shelling the city. Rebel artillerists did not respond actively against these fires in order to save ammunition. The information given by V. Voronkov, the head of the operational department, to the army headquarters stated:

Half of the city was destroyed by our artillery strikes.

On the 3rd day of the uprising, the commander of the 20th division, Velikhanov, saw that only 100-150 of his subordinate soldiers were left, and began to prepare to evict the survivors from the city and build a fortification in one of the nearby areas. Commanders like Mikhail Gorivatov also died in the battle. On the same day, 4-5 artillery brigades were deployed around the station. Armored trains "Krasny Dagestanets", "Krasnaya Astrakhan", "III International", "Grom", "Karl Marx", "Shaumyan-Kaparidze" also arrived at the station. The city was constantly under fire from artillery and armoured trains. Bolshevik soldiers also died as a result of these artillery fires.

The spies of Said Javadov, a staunch communist living in Ganja, used to run through the vineyards at night and inform the headquarters of the 11th army about the places where the rebels gathered and the ammunition depots. Because of their betrayal, Said and his spies were caught and shot by Sari Alakbar's men.

On the night of 28–29 May, the rebels received information about the peace treaty concluded between Soviet Russia and Georgia. This was a big blow for the rebels. It was clear that no help would come from Georgia. The rebels had to rely only on their own strength.

At 7 o'clock in the morning on 29 May, the units of the Red Army began to attack. The 178th and 179th regiments attacked in the northwestern direction of the city. Before entering the city, the Bolsheviks encountered resistance from the rebels. The forces attacking from the Armenian part, from the east of the city did not manage to reach the other side of the Ganja river. The Red Cavalry, advancing from the south of the city, was stopped by the rebels who had taken positions in the gardens and vineyards here. Despite their large numbers, the Bolsheviks could not break the resistance of the national forces. After repelling the first blows of the Bolsheviks, the rebels successfully launched a counterattack and attempted to encircle the 178th and 179th regiments. In order not to be encircled, these regiments of the Bolsheviks retreated with great losses. Riders of the 18th Cavalry Regiment under the leadership of Kuryshko were supposed to attack the city from the south and southwest, but due to strong resistance, they could not fulfill this task and retreated with heavy losses. The 180th infantry regiment also tried to enter the city from the eastern direction with the help of Armenian units, but this attempt was prevented by the rebels. When the Bolsheviks tried to cross the overflowing Ganja River, they were fired upon by machine guns. As a result, dozens of Bolsheviks were drowned and shot dead. With the help of cannons, two machine gun divisions and partisans, it was possible to resist the Bolshevik forces until the end of the day. Captain Mirizade, the battalion commander, was heroically martyred during the fighting.

The following is written in the notes for 1 June in the operational manual of the XI Red Army headquarters:

the besieged stubbornly resisted and inflicted serious losses on us. The anger of the Bolsheviks grew stronger and stronger. Probably, the rebels, seeing the failure of our demonstration attack and our weakness, simultaneously attacked the Armenian part of the city and the station, where our units were located during the rebellion. After that, the rebels didn't try to attack any more. However, they opened artillery fire and inflicted significant losses on us.

After the unsuccessful attack on 29 May, the command of the XI Red Army had to urgently involve new forces here. In particular, the 2nd division of the 20th rifle regiment led by Voytsekhovsky from the border of Georgia, as well as the 175th and 176th regiments, one light artillery division, an Armenian mountain battery and an armoured car division from Baku were involved in suppressing the rebellion. As a result, before the attack, the Bolsheviks had 5 infantry regiments, 6 cavalry regiments, 57 heavy artillery guns, 2 armoured car divisions and 6 armoured trains.

From 30 May, Soviet forces began to seize the military initiative around and inside the city. Initially, the 1 st battalion and the partisan detachment around it, had to retreat from their position under the strong pressure of numerous red forces. As a result, the Armenian quarter of the city came under the control of the Soviet forces. On that day, at the same time, a serious attack took place on the positions of the 2nd battalion, which took a position in the direction of Shamkir. However, it was possible to stop the Soviet forces in this direction.

=== Suppression of the Uprising ===
The rebellion that began in Ganja quickly affected the nearby regions and covered the entire country. Realizing what these speeches could mean for the Soviet government, the 11th army headquarters sent the following directives to all military unit commanders on the day of the Ganja uprising:

Baku, May 26, special secret operational directive No. 60. A rebellion has broken out in Yelizavetpol. A similar rebellion was put down in Tartar a while ago. It seems that something is being prepared in Baku... A general uprising is expected... We must be ready for the struggle. For this, the territory of the Republic of Azerbaijan is divided into military districts, the brutal suppression of rebellions is entrusted to the responsible chiefs of those districts... When suppressing a rebellion, district chiefs should not wait for an order to cancel, because communication can be broken at any moment. Independent action must be taken, full initiative must be taken to destroy the rebellions, all suspects elements should be shot without trial. In order to prevent the uprising, 4 people should be taken as hostages from among the most prominent and influential sections of the population to be shot in the future. Small sparks should be suppressed with harshness and ruthlessness, if the uprisings take the form of a mass emergency on the basis of national and religious strife, then we should all turn to Baku and cleaning the city from all harmful elements. Rebellions in other areas of the republic must be brutally suppressed.

On 31 May, the Bolsheviks gathered 5 infantry and 6 cavalry regiments, 7 special detachments, 2 armoured car divisions, 8 armoured trains, and 57 heavy artillery around Ganja. They decided to make a decisive attack from the north from the direction of the railway station. The reason for this was that there were few buildings in that direction. According to historians Darabadi and Kadishev, the decisive attack began at 9 o'clock on 31 May from the direction of the railway station and extended along the highway. Colonel Obertas, Velikanov's aide-de-camp, also noted that the attack was at 9 o'clock in the morning. At the same time, at 1:00 p.m. on the same day, the following was written in the order given by Kurishko: "In May of this date, at 5:00 p.m., a general attack on the city of Ganja will begin... All commanders should be in their places... The rebels must be destroyed at any cost in a real battle. keep them firmly in mind."

The main attack was aimed at the northern direction of the city with five infantry regiments. The attack was carried out in two echelons, with 3 regiments in the first and 2 regiments in the second. The latter two regiments were instructed to continue the raid if successful, and to reinforce the defence if unsuccessful. The five attacking regiments were supported by all the artillery forces and the armoured division under the leadership of L. Plumen, who commanded the XX infantry regiment. The cavalry units were assigned to restrict access to the city and prevent the retreat of the rebels to the west, towards the mountains. The area where the military operations took place was almost entirely made up of vineyards, which made the attack difficult. In addition, the clay soil washed by the rains also hindered the movement of the equipment. Later, the Red Army forced the rebels to retreat from the vineyards and entered the northern part of the city of Ganja with the full support of artillery. Fighting broke out all over the city. Red army units, divided into groups, began to search for rebels in the city. The rebels were fighting fiercely. In the operational documents of the XI Red Army headquarters, it was noted that: "The rebels stubbornly did not retreat from their positions."

Red Army soldier Anatoliy Somashuk described the battles as follows:

On the fifth day of the uprising, after the rocket signal was given, the attack towards the city began. Our group advanced to the cloth factory. We lacked ammunition. In that battle, we lost contact with the left flank. We had a lot of casualties. Only the next day we were able to take the advantage.

According to the writings of the Soviet historian Treskunov, Peter Kurishko ran forward during one of the attacks and was surrounded by several cavalry rebels. But at this time, the paramedic girl comes to his aid by galloping the horse and takes him out of the siege. In another battle in the Yelenendorf area, despite being wounded for the 17th time (this time in the hand), Kurishko replaced his horse with a tachanka and continued to lead the cavalry. Savva Protsenko, commander of the 1 st squadron of the 103rd Cavalry Regiment, was killed in battle while paving the way for the cavalry division. On the other hand, according to the memories of the Turkish communist Mustafa Subhi, even women participated in street battles against the Bolsheviks. The operational summary of the XI Red Army dated 1 June showed that the rebels were killed almost one by one by artillery fire.

At the time when the street battles were going on in the city, the disarmed Bolsheviks, commanders, staff members, and including the commander of the 3rd brigade of the 20th infantry division, Alexander Schirmacher, were held in the prison in Ganja. Hamid Sultanov, ACP's extraordinary commissioner for Ganja governorate from Baku, was coming to Ganja with a group of Bolsheviks on a special duty. The Extraordinary Commissar of the AKP (b) for the Ganja province H. Sultanov arrived in Ganja from Baku on a special mission, accompanied by a group of Bolsheviks and with his help the arrested Red Army soldiers headed by A. G. Schirmacher disarmed the guards and, having captured two serviceable machine guns and one gun with ammunition in a nearby weapons workshop, opened fire from the rear. Later, in 1922, in Schirmacher's attestation signed by Mikhail Velikanov, it was stated that: "Shirmacher, even if he is non-partisan, is completely on the side of the Soviet government in his convictions, which he proved many times during the Ganja uprising. If he was captured by the rebels, he remained loyal to the Red Army and released other prisoners. helped to take Ganja by XX division."

According to Azerbaijani historian Tofig Bagirov, the attack of the imprisoned Bolsheviks from behind and the arrival of new armoured trains to Ganja led to the success of the Bolsheviks.

According to the writings of Jahangir Bey Kazimbeyli, the decisive attack of the Soviet forces on Ganja took place on 31 May and 1 June. On 2 June, the city was again subjected to heavy artillery fire, and then armoured vehicles accompanied by numerous infantries from the direction of the station moved towards the center of the city. At the same time, the Bolsheviks in the Armenian part of the city also started moving towards the city center. At 12 o'clock in the afternoon, the situation of the rebels became much more complicated, there was no longer any possibility of resistance. According to J. Kazimbeyli's writing, on the morning of 3 June, it was possible to break through the siege of the Red forces and withdraw to the height in the north-west of the city with less than one battalion. A certain part of the city's population was also able to get out of this broken part of the siege.

Mammadgasim, a qachaq from Samukh who was a participant in the uprising, remembered the suppression of the Ganja uprising as follows:

Finally, the Bolsheviks were able to enter Ganja from the direction of Uchtepe of the city. For three days and three nights, they brutally killed children, women, and the elderly without any discrimination. There were so many corpses in the streets that it was impossible to move. Heavy rains aggravated the situation on the one hand. The Ganja River was overflowing, preventing access to the city. The water pools of the city were also filled with fresh blood. The advance of the enemies in the second part of the city increased this disaster even more. The women of Ganja, who protected their honor and dignity, first threw their babies and then themselves into the water and died. We managed to leave some of these poor women across the river with our horses. However, under the fire that rained down on us, it was impossible to save them completely. This was a tragedy, an intolerable tragedy. With such actions, the Bolsheviks brought freedom, brotherhood and socialism to Azerbaijan. When they entered Ganja, the city was empty.

According to information from the XI Red Army, a decisive attack by the Bolsheviks on 31 May led to the suppression of the uprising that day. Suffering heavy casualties, the rebels began to leave their positions, and the rebellion was completely suppressed by evening. According to the report prepared by V. Voronkov, the head of the Operations Department of the 11th Army, on the morning of 31 May, the red forces launched a decisive attack and entered the city, breaking the resistance of the rebels in all directions. He also admitted that there was a fierce battle inside the city. Because the rebels did not leave their position easily. Therefore, the shelling of the city was intensified. The Red forces continuously shelled the city without noticing where the shells fell. Voronkov also wrote that half of Ganja was destroyed after the cannon fire of the Red forces. The people who wanted to save their lives from these ruins were killed on the spot by the Red Cavalry. Some of the rebels, as well as the inhabitants of the city, managed to break through the siege with the help of the 3rd Ganja infantry regiment and left the city and headed towards the mountains.

== See also ==
- Svaneti uprising of 1921 in Georgia.
- February Uprising 1921, in Armenia
