= Javad bey Shikhlinski =

Azerbaijani general

- Azerbaijani: Cavad bəy Şıxlinski
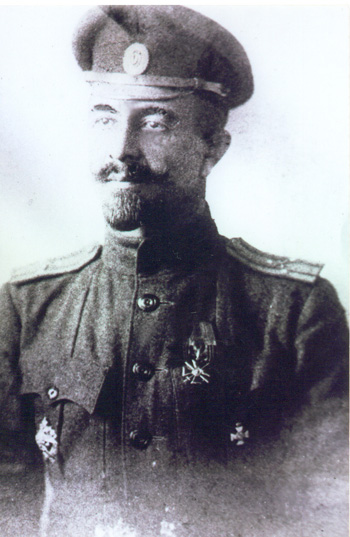
- Born: Javad bey Mammad agha oghlu Shikhlinski; January 3, 1874; Aşağı Salahlı, Kazakh uezd, Elizavetpol Governorate, Caucasus Viceroyalty (1801–1917), Imperial Russia
- Died: June 30, 1959 (aged 85); Turkey
- Children: Chingiz Shikhlinski; Nazir Shikhlinski; Gohvar Shikhlinskaya
- Military career
- Allegiance: Russian Empire (from 1871 to 1909); Azerbaijan Democratic Republic (from 1919 to 1920)
- Branch: Cavalry
- Service years: 1892 – 1920s
- Rank: (Russian Empire) Colonel of The Imperial Russian Army (from 1892 to 1920), Artillery General of The National Army of Azerbaijan Democratic Republic (from 1917 to 1920)
- Unit: Artillery
- Conflicts: World War I Armenian–Azerbaijani war (1918–1920); 1920 Ganja revolt
- Awards: Medal "In memory of the 300th anniversary of the reign of the Romanov dynasty"

Javad bey Mammad agha oghlu Shikhlinski (Azerbaijani: Cavad bəy Məmməd Ağa oğlu Şıxlinski; January 3, 1874 – 1959) was an officer of the Tsarist army, a major general of the Azerbaijan Republic Army, and the commander of the Ardabil garrison in the Qajar army.

He participated in World War I and was awarded various degrees of the Orders of Saint Anna, Saint Stanislaus, and Saint Vladimir.

During the Azerbaijan Republic period, he participated in battles as part of the Caucasian Islamic Army and was the commander of the First Infantry Division. He led the Zangezur expedition and was one of the organizers of the Ganja uprising.

== Life and the way of war ==
=== In Tsarist Russia ===
Javad bey Shikhlinski, son of Mammad agha, was born on January 3, 1874, in the village of Aşağı Salahlı in the Kazakh district. After completing his education at the Tiflis Cadet Corps, he entered the Konstantinovsk Artillery School in Saint Petersburg on August 28, 1892. After graduating with first-class honors, on August 8, 1894, he was appointed as an instructor in the 39th Artillery Brigade. On August 18, 1895, he was sent to the Kazakh district to select horses for the brigade. From November 1897, he served as the senior officer of the 3rd Battery and was stationed in Kars and Alexandropol. He was promoted to the rank of poruchik on July 1, 1898, to staff captain on August 19, 1901, and to captain on January 1, 1909. On March 28, 1904, he was appointed commander of the 5th Battery stationed in Kars. For his exemplary service, he was awarded the Order of Saint Anna, 3rd Class, on March 16, 1908, and the Order of Saint Stanislaus, 2nd Class, in March 1911. In 1912, as a captain, he became the commander of the 1st Company of the 39th Artillery Brigade. On February 21, 1913, in honor of the 300th anniversary of the Romanov dynasty, Javad bey was awarded a commemorative medal and promoted to the rank of lieutenant colonel. In 1913, he was appointed commander of the 23rd Large Caliber Artillery Division. He participated in World War I, during which he was awarded twice by the Supreme Command. On February 15, 1914, he was awarded the Order of Saint Anna, 2nd Class, and on January 31, 1915, the Order of Saint Vladimir, 4th Class, followed by another Order of Saint Vladimir, 4th Class (with swords and ribbon), on September 29, 1915. On February 10, 1916, he was appointed commander of the 4th Battery of the 45th Artillery Brigade. He was further awarded the Order of Saint Anna, 2nd Class (with swords), on October 21, 1916, and the Order of Saint Stanislaus, 2nd Class (with swords), on December 2, 1916. In 1917, he was appointed commander of the 1st Division of the 45th Artillery Brigade. On April 22, 1917, he was promoted to the rank of colonel, and on October 3, 1917, he was awarded the Order of Saint Vladimir, 3rd Class.

=== In Azerbaijani National Army ===
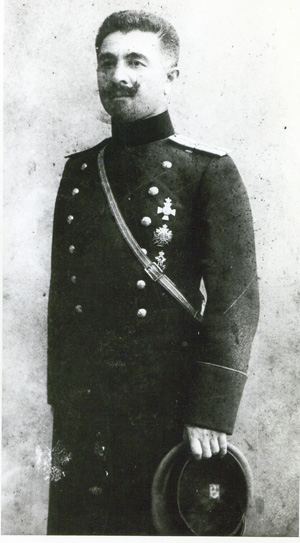
Javad Bey Shikhlinski until 1917

In the summer of 1918, Javad bey returned to Azerbaijan and was appointed commander of the 2nd Infantry Regiment in the Azerbaijani Special Corps (commander, former commander of the 10th Army of the Western Front, Lieutenant General Aliagha Shikhlinski). He participated in battles as part of the Caucasian Islamic Army. On September 3, 1918, for his bravery in battle, he was awarded a medal by Nuru Pasha. By the order of Nuru Pasha, on September 19, 1918, he was appointed the commandant of the city of Ganja. By the military minister's order No. 39, dated December 31, 1918, he was appointed deputy chief inspector of artillery troops in the Artillery Department from December 27, 1918, with the rank of colonel. On February 17, 1919, by the order of the military minister, he was appointed head of the Ganja garrison. On February 22, 1919, he was appointed commander of the First Infantry Division. For his services in the formation and strengthening of the division, Javad bey Shikhlinski was awarded the rank of major general by the decision of the Council of Ministers on June 25, 1919. On June 27, 1919, by the order of the military minister, he was appointed commander of the Ganja city garrison, effective from July 1.

In 1919, by the decision of the government of the Azerbaijan Republic, Javad bey was appointed commander of the Zangezur expedition, which was created to stop the massacres of Muslims carried out by the Dashnaks in the Zangezur region. The Zangezur expedition consisted of two columns. The first column was led by Major General Davud bey Yadigarov, and the second by Colonel Vladimir Levestam. Javad bey initiated actions to seize the roads connecting Karabakh and Zangezur. Both the first and second columns advanced towards the village of Digh from various directions. Later, Sultan bey Sultanov's partisan forces joined the expedition. After the battles, the Azerbaijan–Armenia agreement was signed on November 23.

On April 10, 1920, to strengthen the defense of the Ganja region, by the order of Minister of Defense Samed bey Mehmandarov, Major General Javad bey Shikhlinski, commander of the First Infantry Division, was appointed head of the Ganja fortified district.

=== Ganja revolt ===
After the April occupation, in May, Javad bey Shikhlinski, Jahangir bey Kazimbeyli, and Ganja commandant Muhammad Mirza Qajar were relieved of their positions. In protest against the occupation of Azerbaijan by the Bolsheviks, the Azerbaijani military units stationed in Ganja and the local population started an uprising. Javad bey Shikhlinski was one of the organizers of the Ganja uprising. He was responsible for the restoration of the destroyed artillery equipment and the organization of artillery operations during the uprising.

In a report sent to Baku by the People's Commissariat for Internal Affairs on June 3, 1920, it was written:

On May 18, Extraordinary Commissar Hamid Sultanov arrived in Ganja with six instructors. On May 25, at 3 a.m., the uprising began following an artillery strike. By 5 a.m., when the Revolutionary Committee's instructors and state officials took to the streets, they were captured and imprisoned. At that time, intense fighting was taking place in the city. Leading the uprising were General Shikhlinski, Colonel Kazimbeyov, Prince Muhammad Mirza Qajar, the Khoyski brothers, the well-known Gambar and Alekber, along with soldiers of the 3rd Ganja Regiment.

A few hours before the defeat of the uprising, Javad bey was seriously wounded by artillery fire. Later, he was taken out of the siege and brought to the village of Ashagi Salakhli. Since it was dangerous to stay there, his relative, Madat bey Alganov, first took him to the Qarayazi forest and then to Tbilisi.

== Life in Exile ==
After leaving Tbilisi, Javad bey went to Iran. Due to his professional military background, he was appointed commander of the Ardabil garrison. However, while living there, he was pursued by the Bolsheviks, forcing him to emigrate to Turkey.

After staying in Turkey for a while, Javad bey Shikhlinski returned to Iran. With the help of his cousin, Mohammad Shikhlinski, who had emigrated to Iran a few years earlier and had already become a colonel in the army, Javad bey joined the Iranian army. He was promoted to the rank of lieutenant colonel in Iran and later to colonel. He learned the Persian language and was initially appointed artillery commander in the city of Mashhad and deputy commander of the Eastern Army. After spending several years in Mashhad, he was recalled to Tehran and appointed head of the Officers' Club in the Iranian army.

Javad bey Shikhlinski (Javad Agha Sheykhli) died in 1959 in Tehran. His grave is located in the old section of the Imamzadeh Abdullah Cemetery in Rey, near Tehran.

== Family ==
Javad bey Shikhlinski was the grandson of Huseyn Efendi Gayibov, the nephew of Aliaga Shikhlinski, and the brother of Jahangir bey Shikhlinski and Rustam Shikhlinski. He was also the uncle of the writer Ismayil Shikhli.

Javad bey Shikhlinski married an Iranian woman named Zari Asadzadeh in Iran, and they had three children: sons Chingiz and Nazir (or Muhammad), and a daughter named Gohvar.

His eldest son, Chingiz Sheykhli, was a speleologist and mountaineer. He dedicated 70 years of his life to exploring caves, discovering more than 500 caves in Iran. He was one of the pioneers in this field in Iran and co-founded the first Speleology Society in Iran in 1946.

== Awards ==
- - 3rd Class Order of Saint Vladimir
- - 4th Class Order of Saint Vladimir
- - 2nd Class Ode of Saint Stanislaus
- - 3rd Class Ode of Saint Stanislaus
- - 2nd Class Order of Saint Anne
- - 3rd Class Order of Saint Anne
- - Medal "In memory of the 300th anniversary of the reign of the Romanov dynasty"
- - Ottoman War Medal

== See also ==
- Masum bey Qayibov
