= Lutheran church (Ganja) =

Puppet theater in former Russian Orthodox church in Ganja

Russian Orthodox church
- (Azerbaijani: Rus pravoslav kilsəsi)
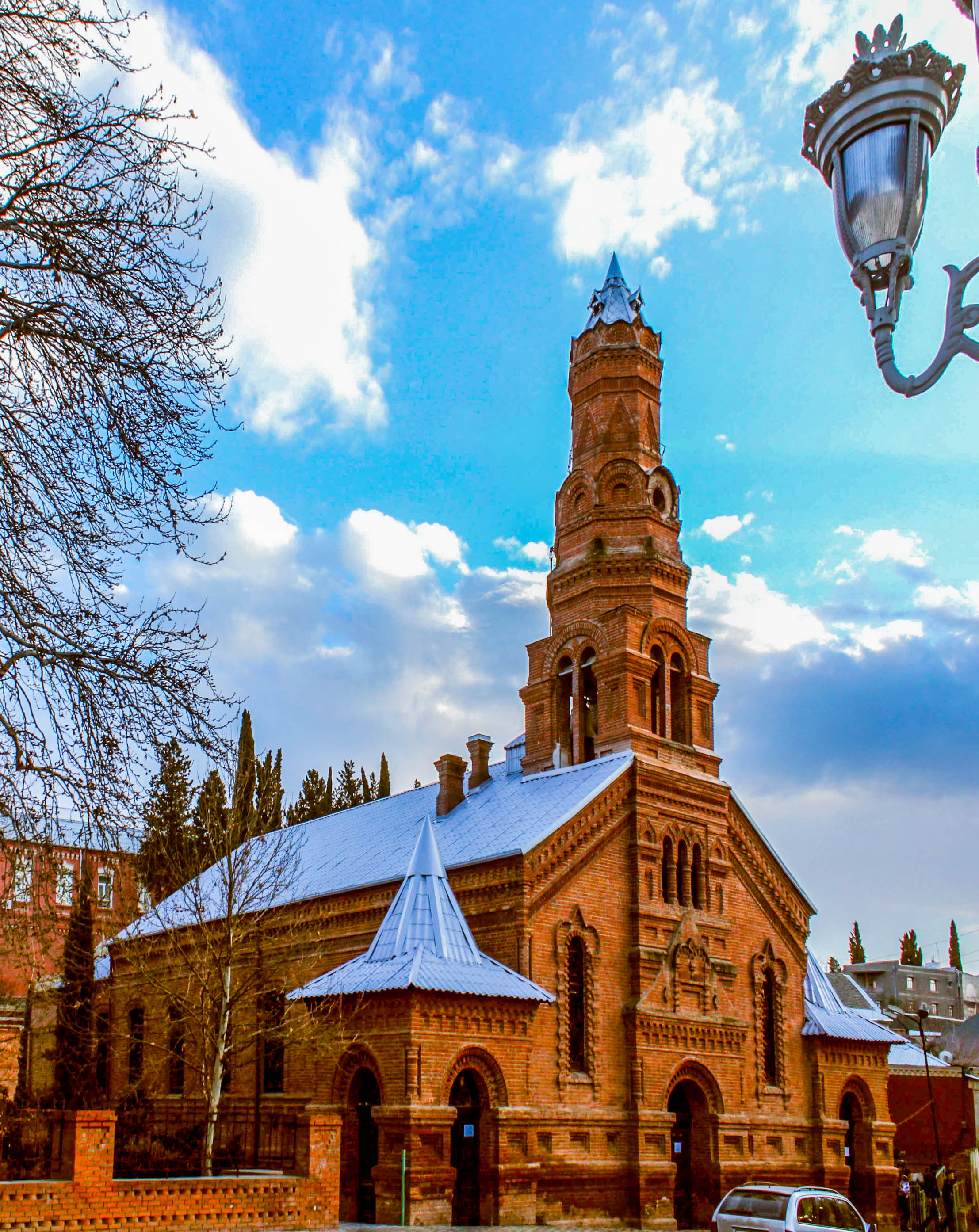

Religion
- Affiliation: Eastern Orthodoxy

Location
- Location: Ganja Azerbaijan
- Interactive map of Russian Orthodox church

Architecture
- Style: Eclecticism
- Completed: 1902
- Materials: baked brick

Sts. Cyril and Methodius Church is a Russian Orthodox Church built in Ganja in 1902. It is currently used as a puppet theater.

== History ==
Saints Cyril and Methodius Church at the Elizavetpol Men's Gymnasium is located on the right bank of the Ganjachay River. Initially, this house church was opened in honour of missionary brothers Cyril and Methodius in one of the big halls of the gymnasium by the approval of its director I. Staritskiy on 18 September 1885. Aghasaid-Hussein Agha-Muhammadoghlu, the honorary trustee of the gymnasium, was engaged in the arrangement of the church. Over time, the growth in the number of Orthodox students of the gymnasium led to the need to build more capacious church. As a result, on the initiative of I. Staritskiy, the construction of a new church was started in a separate building near the gymnasium. On 20 December 1902, at the grand opening ceremony, the church was consecrated by Alexy, the Exarch of Georgia, and opened to visitors. The building was built at the special expense of the gymnasium and could easily accommodate up to 500 believers, not counting the space reserved for the students of the classical gymnasium. Thus, the church became available for use by urban residents as well. The fate of the church after the closure of the Ganja Men's Gymnasium in 1920 is unknown. It is assumed that the church used by German colonists until the early 1940s, but there is no documentary evidence of that. There is also no evidence that this church was a Lutheran church, given the fact that during these years there was no German Lutheran Community in Kirovabad, where an insignificant number of Germans (50–100 people) lived. On 18 September 1986, by order of the Cabinet of Ministers of the Azerbaijan SSR, the building was handed over to the use of the Ganja State Puppet Theatre which operates to this day.

== Description ==
The building was built of baked bricks. Onion domes also prove that the building belonged to the Russian Orthodox church. The total area is about 650 square meters. Inside, the building is divided into a central hall and a foyer.

== See also ==
- St. John's Church, Goygol
- Church of the Saviour, Baku
