= Kapaz, Ganja =

Kapaz Kəpəz
- Raion
- Location within Azerbaijan
- Coordinates: 40°40′58″N 46°21′38″E
- Country: Azerbaijan
- City: Ganja

Population
  - Total: 178 500
- Time zone: UTC+4 (AZT)
  - Summer (DST): UTC+5 (AZT)
- Website: http://kapaz.ganja-ih.gov.az/index.html

Kapaz raion (Azerbaijani: Kəpəz rayonu) is a settlement and raion of Ganja, Azerbaijan. The district is named after the Mount Kapaz. It has a population of 180,600.

== Details ==
Kapaz district (Kəpəz rayonu) was established on November 21, 1980, according to the decision of Supreme Soviet of Azerbaijan SSR. The total area of this district is 7064 hectares, and its population is 180 thousand (2018). The district consists of 2 administrative territorial units and 6 settlements (namely Hajikend, Javadkhan, Shixzamanli, Natavan, Mahsati and Sadilli). The last 5 settlements were established in December 2011 according to the "Law on Making partial changes in the administrative-territorial division of Kapaz district of Ganja city".

There are 27 schools, 4 vocational schools, 21 kindergartens, Azerbaijan Technological University, 12 branches of Ganja Central Library, 2 music schools, Ganja State Historical-Cultural Reserve, Nizami Mausoleum, Ganja Fortress Gates Monumental Complex, Imamzadeh religious complex, Ganja City Stadium, Ganja Regional Post Office in this district.

== Gallery ==
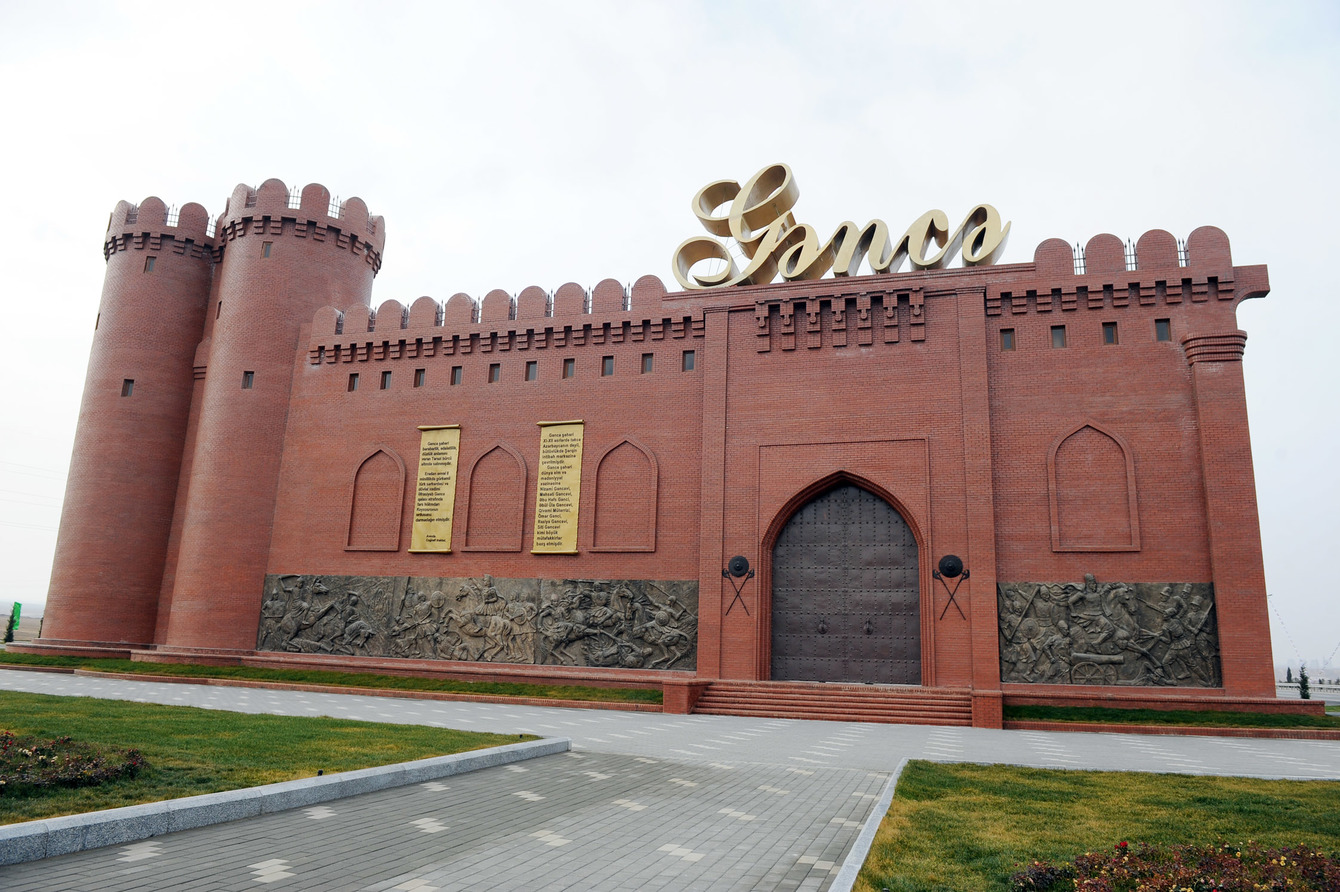
Ganja Fortress Gates Monumental Complex

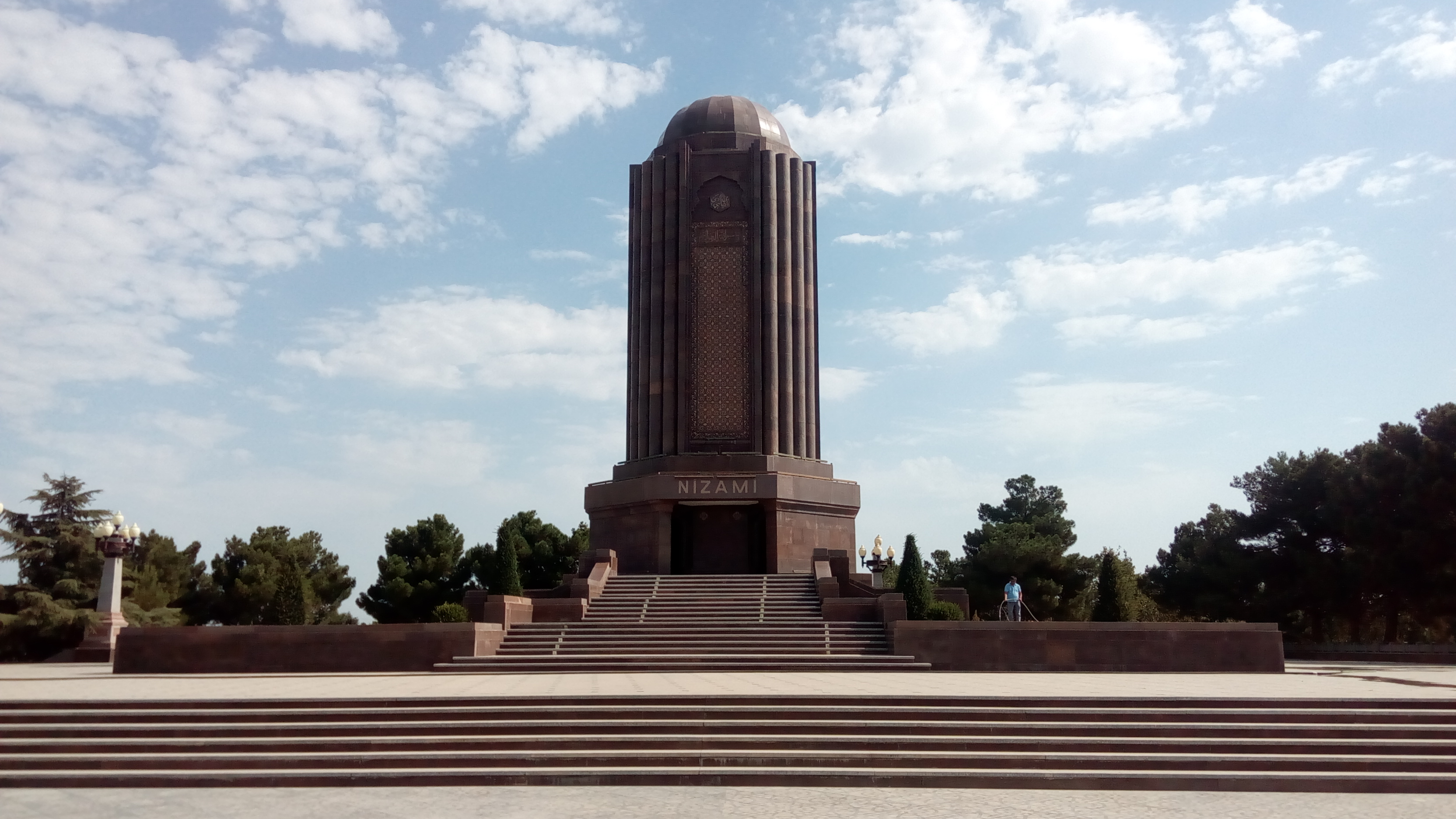
Nizami Mausolem

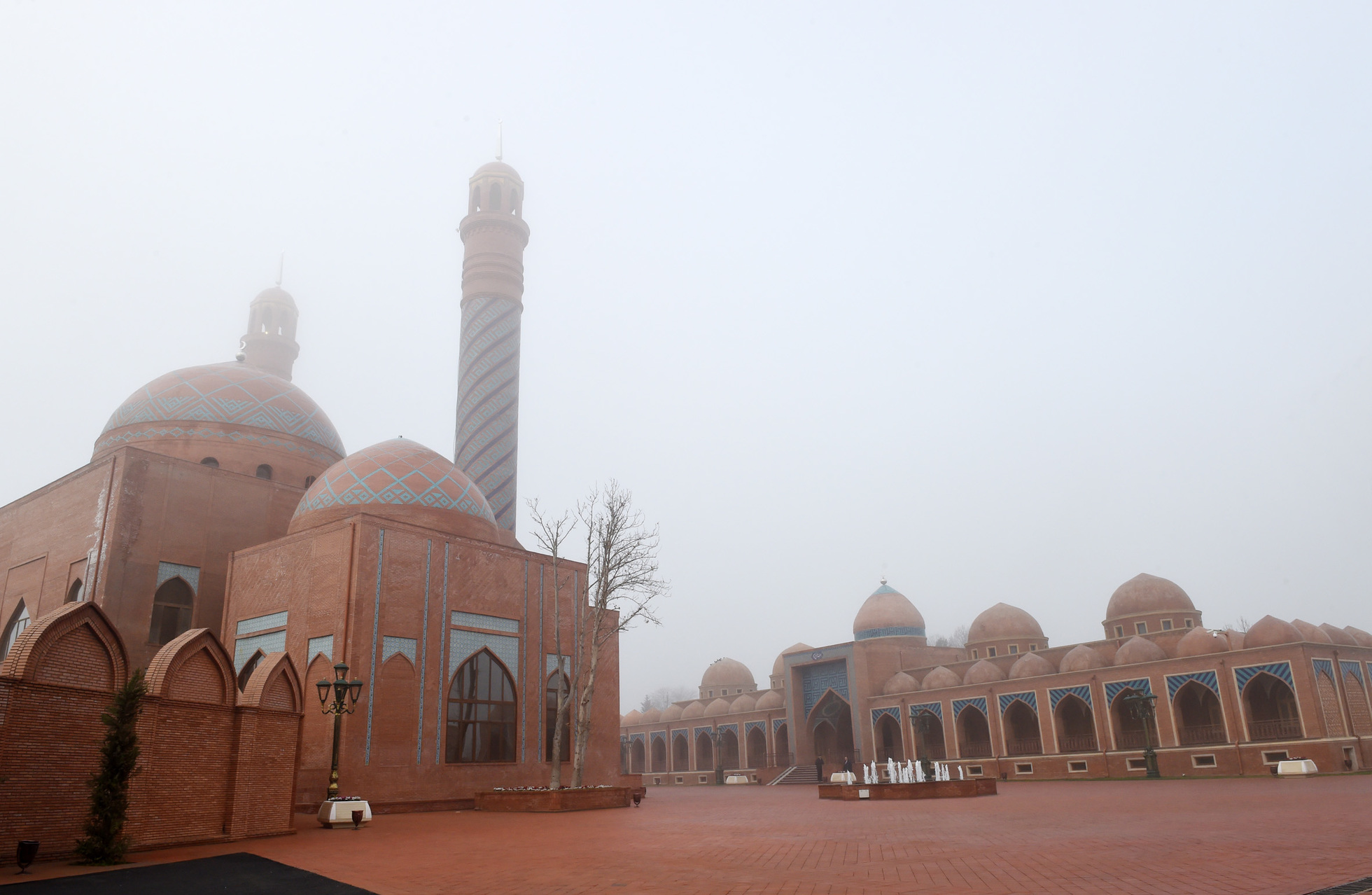
Imamzadeh religious complex

== See also ==
- Nizami raion (Ganja)
- Administrative divisions of Azerbaijan
