= Müsüslü Military Detachment =

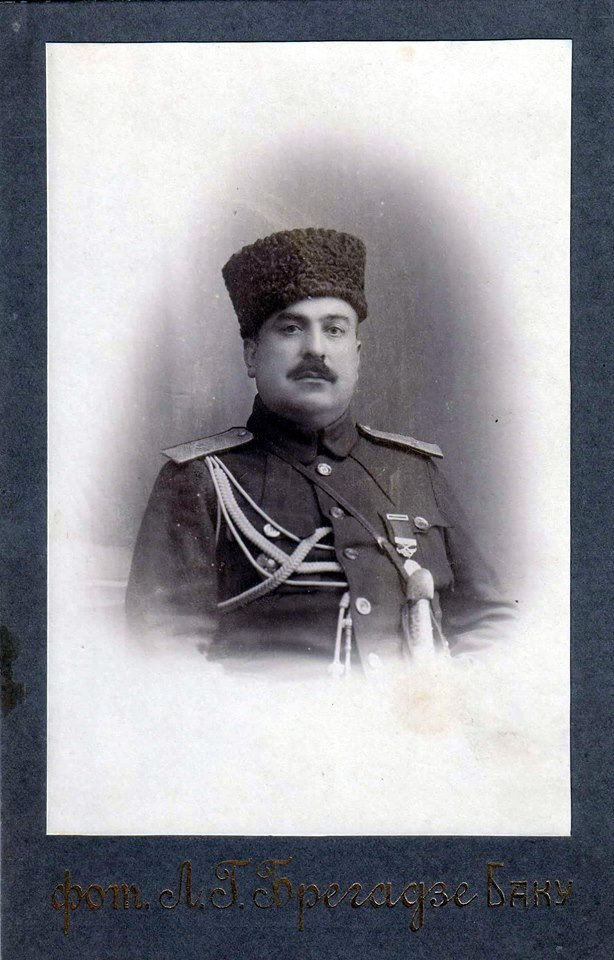
Commander of Müsüslü Military Detachment Habib Bey Salimov

Müsüslü Military Unit (Müsüslü Hərbi Dəstəsi) the national military unit and subdivisions that took up positions in June 1918 near the Müsüslü station against the forces of the I Caucasian Red Corps, which consisted of the Dashnak-Bolshevik groups of the Baksovnarkom, which were moving towards Ganja to liquidate the Azerbaijan Democratic Republic.

== Creation ==
They were based on Azerbaijani units and subdivisions created as part of the Muslim Corps. While the attack of the Dashnak-Bolshevik groups on Ganja was intensifying, the chief of staff of the Caucasian Islamic Army Nazim bey arrived at the Müsüslü station on June 14, 1918, and took personal command of the national units and subdivisions located here. On June 27, 1918, Nazim bey was called to Ganja. The military units and subdivisions near Müsüslü were united under a single command and were named the Müsüslü Detachment. By order of the commander of the Caucasian Islamic Army, Lieutenant Colonel Habib Bey Salimov was appointed commander of this detachment. The detachment included the following Azerbaijani units and subunits:

- I and II companies of the 1st Tatar cavalry regiment
- II company of the 2nd Cavalry unit
- Garayazin cavalry-land forces and foot unit
- Machine gun company
- Armored train
- Field artillery battery
- Telegraph platoon
- Goychay soldier company

== Battles ==
A detachment consisting of the 1st brigade of the 1st Caucasian red Dashnak-Bolshevik corps and the personnel of the instruction school was created against the Müsüslü detachment. The Bolsheviks also had an armored train.

On July 2, 1918, the detachment of L. Bicherakhov was also involved against the Müsüslü detachment, to which the command of the front was transferred. The Müsüslü detachment took part in 3 battles: June 18–29 on the Müsüslü-Garamaryam line, July 5-10 near Kurdamir, and July 12-14 near Karrar station. Depending on the mashstab of the battles, the detachment was strengthened both by the Ottoman Armed Forces and by volunteer Azerbaijani detachments. For example, during the Kurdamir battles, on the orders of Nuri Pasha, detachments located in Agdash and Khaldan, as well as a Qazax detachment, consisting of 350 unarmed fighters, were added to the Müsüslü detachment.

On July 16, 1918, the Southern group was created on the basis of the Müsüslü detachment, and the Müsüslü detachment was disbanded.

== See also ==
- 1st Infantry Division (Azerbaijan, 1918)
