= Zangezur Expedition =

Zangezur Expedition or Battle of Zangezur
- Part of the Armenian-Azerbaijani War during the Caucasus campaign of World War I
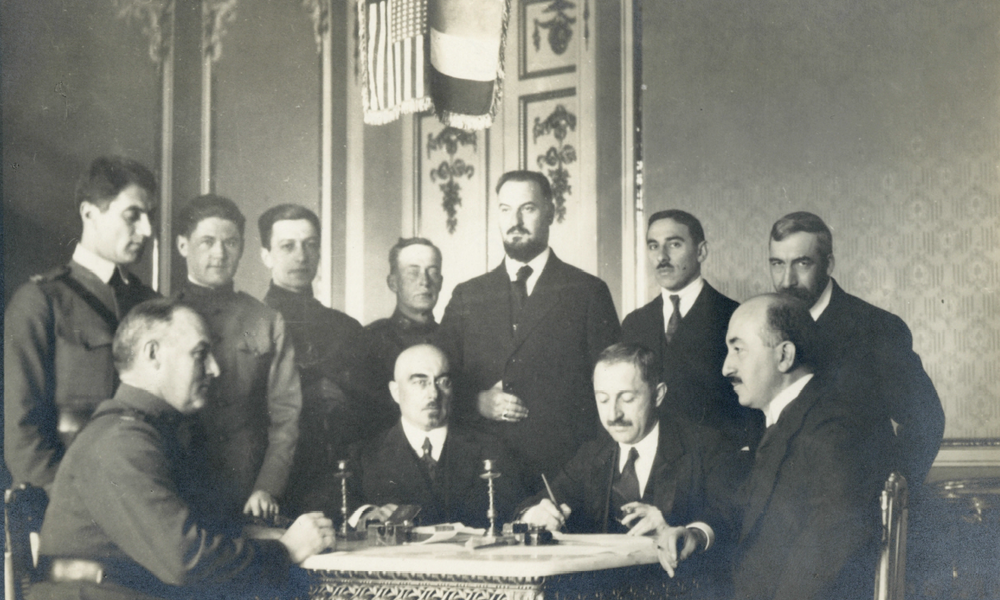
- On November 23, 1919, the Azerbaijan-Armenia agreement was signed in Tbilisi. Seated (from left to right): Colonel James Rey, acting as the Allied High Commissioner; Alexander Khatisyan, Head of the Armenian Government; Nasib bey Yusifbeyli, Head of the Azerbaijani Government; and Evgeni Gegechkori, Minister of Foreign Affairs of Georgia.
Date	3/4–9 November 1919 (5/6 days)
Location	Zangezur uezd
Result	Armenian victory: Status quo ante bellum; Withdrawal of Azerbaijani troops following Armenian counteroffensive.; Tiflis Agreement was signed, but military actions and ethnic cleansings continued despite the agreement.

Belligerents
(Azerbaijan Democratic Republic) Azerbaijan (Ottoman Empire) Turkish platoons (Kurdistan Region) Auxiliary Kurdish cavalry	(First Republic of Armenia) Armenia

Commanders and leaders
(Azerbaijan Democratic Republic) Javad bey Shikhlinski (Azerbaijan Democratic Republic) Davud bey Yadigarov (Azerbaijan Democratic Republic) Sultan bey Sultanov (Azerbaijan Democratic Republic) Vladimir Levestam (Ottoman Empire) Halil Kut	(First Republic of Armenia) Arsen Shahmazian (First Republic of Armenia) Garegin Nzhdeh (First Republic of Armenia) Misha Iskhanian

Strength
1,500–5,500	Unknown

Casualties and losses
45 killed, 75 wounded (according to Azerbaijani sources) Several hundreds (according to Armenian sources)	Unknown

Zangezur Expedition (Azerbaijani: Zəngəzur ekspedisiyası) (Armenian: Ճակատամարտ Զանգեզուրի համար) also referred to as the Zangezur Operation, Azerbaijani invasion of Zangezur or the Battle for Zangezur, was an incursion by Azerbaijani regular forces from Karabakh into Zangezur region contested by the nascent republics of Azerbaijan and Armenia—with the aim of eliminating the last barrier between Turkey and Azerbaijan. This operation was accompanied by a parallel invasion by Nakhchivan militias, supported by two Turkish platoons from Nakhchivan.

== Background ==
In 1917, following the Russian Revolution, Zangezur was governed by an interethnic council based in Goris. However, the gradual deterioration of relations between the two communities culminated at the end of that year when the Muslim population decided to establish a separate administration in the village of Dondarlu.

During the winter of 1917–1918, the turmoil in Russia and the Transcaucasian region led to famine, which exacerbated ethnic tensions. By the spring of 1918, Armenians decided to block the annual migration of Azerbaijani nomads to alpine pastures. Armenian fighters from Khnus, Sassun, and Van prepared to enforce this decision, escalating tensions. By June 1918, interethnic conflict had engulfed Zangezur. Armenian messengers urgently sought assistance from Erevan, but with Turkish forces threatening the Armenian capital, the Republic of Armenia could offer little more than moral support. Amid this crisis, Andranik arrived in Zangezur, commanding an irregular force of 3,000 to 5,000 men and accompanied by thousands of refugees fleeing Turkish-occupied regions of Armenia. Andranik, refusing to recognize the Armenian Republic due to its submission to Turkish demands under the Treaty of Batum, sought to align with British forces in northern Persia. However, Turkish divisions intercepted his forces near Khoy, forcing a retreat to Nakhichevan. By July, Andranik's troops and the displaced civilians relocated to Zangezur's mountainous regions.

The influx of approximately 30,000 refugees worsened famine in Zangezur, but Armenian leaders welcomed Andranik, recognizing the looming threat of Turkish forces advancing from Erevan and Ganja. Zangezur appeared poised to become the last bastion of Armenian resistance. Throughout September and October, Andranik's forces and the local population prepared for a Turkish assault. To secure key routes across Zangezur, Andranik targeted fortified Muslim villages, beginning the process of consolidating Armenian control over the region. Andranik's actions provoked protests from General Halil Pasha, who warned the Armenian government of potential retaliation. In response, Armenian Premier Kachaznuni disclaimed responsibility for Andranik's partisans, citing Nuri Pasha's declaration that banned regular Armenian troops from Zangezur as part of Azerbaijan's claim to the region. While Kachaznuni's sincerity might be questioned, his argument was logically sound.

Interethnic warfare in Zangezur, as in other areas with mixed Armenian-Azerbaijani populations, began in 1918. As a result of the 1918 clashes, the local Armenian administration, known as the Central National Council of Zangezur, established control over much of the region, while local Azerbaijanis retained the Bargushat Ridge, which separated Goris and Tatev from Kapan and Meghri, as well as the mountains north of Goris.

Neither Azerbaijan nor Armenia could exert full control over the district. However, in January 1919, the British command in the Caucasus endorsed the Azerbaijani government's appointment of Khosrov bey Sultanov as the governor-general of Karabakh and Zangezur, prompting protests from the Armenian side. In response, the Azerbaijani government insisted on maintaining its administrative rights. The British command urged both sides to await the decision of the Paris Peace Conference.

After the British intended to transfer Sharur-Nakhchivan to Armenia, they were more insistently demanded to withdraw their claims to Zangezur. On March 6, 1919, Lieutenant Colonel Arsen Shahmazian arrived in Goris with instructions from the Armenian government to facilitate the integration of Zangezur into Armenia. Three weeks later, he participated in a conference of district leaders in Zangezur, which reorganized the Armenian governing body of the district, renaming it the Regional Council of Zangezur and Karabakh. However, despite the name, the council's authority was limited to Zangezur. The council, whose main goal was to incorporate this disputed region into Armenia, consisted of Dashnaks, Bolsheviks, and unaffiliated individuals—seven local leaders and five exiles from Karabakh. Nikolai Ovsepyan headed the civilian administration, while Shahmazian continued as acting commissioner and liaison officer with Yerevan. The Armenians prepared to challenge both Azerbaijan and the British command. Demands from British General Shuttleworth and Major Monk-Mason to recognize Azerbaijani authority were ignored.

From mid-April, clashes began between local Muslims (primarily Azerbaijanis, with some Kurds) and Armenians. As a result, many Azerbaijanis from central Zangezur were displaced to the district's borders, the eastern plains, or Iran. Azerbaijan protested the bloodshed, but the Armenian government denied any violations. On June 21, the newspaper Azerbaijan published a report from Khosrov Bey Sultanov stating that the Armenians had blocked passes, leaving 10,000 Muslim nomads and 150,000 head of livestock stranded in the mountains. Sultanov demanded permission from the government to "fulfill his duties to tens of thousands of people".

In Azerbaijan, preparations began to establish control over Zangezur after victories on other fronts in the summer of 1919. (Note: On August 22, 1919, an agreement was signed between Azerbaijan and the Armenian National Council of Karabakh on the temporary recognition of Azerbaijan's jurisdiction over Karabakh until the issue was considered at the Paris Peace Conference. At the end of August 1919, Azerbaijani troops finally established Azerbaijani power in Mughan in Lankaran, where the Whites and Bolsheviks had been fighting since 1918. In early July, a Muslim uprising began in the Nakhichevan, Surmali, Sharur, and Erivan districts, which led to the liberation of most of Sharur-Nakhichevan from Armenian rule.) Less than a week after consolidating control over Karabakh, the leader of the Musavat Party, Mammad Amin Rasulzade, praised the liberation of Karabakh and Lankaran and the struggle of Nakhchivan's residents for unification with Azerbaijan, declaring that the time had come to liberate Zangezur and open the road to Julfa. Meanwhile, pro-Turkish circles in Azerbaijan, despite the dissatisfaction of British commissioners, increased collaboration with both the Ottoman government in Istanbul and Turkish nationalists in Anatolia. In November, Armenian intelligence reported that Azerbaijan's envoy to Turkey, Mir Yusif Bey Vezirov, had recruited 30 Turkish officers and held consultations with the Young Turks regarding the struggle for Zangezur. British intelligence soon corroborated this, adding that Vezirov had held negotiations with the Turkish foreign minister on a defensive alliance.

Azerbaijan initiated a military buildup to strike the positions of local Armenian forces (later reports indicated the presence of regular Armenian troops as well) in Zangezur. By late October, an expeditionary force of several thousand troops was ready for action in Jabrayil and the Hakeri River Valley. The Haji-Shamlu tribe prepared to attack Goris from the northern mountains, while Nakhichevan partisans, led by Turkish officer Halil Bey, advanced towards Sisian through mountain passes.

Amid rising tensions, by October 26, 1919, the governments of Azerbaijan and Armenia agreed to hold a bilateral conference in Baku, scheduled for November 20. However, as the official correspondence between the two governments progressed sluggishly, the tension in disputed territories remained high. Khosrov Bey Sultanov distributed leaflets in Russian, Turkic (Azerbaijani), and Armenian, blaming "dark forces" for destroying several villages and displacing thousands of innocent people. He called on the Armenians of Zangezur to rid themselves of so-called patriots who were plunging the region into chaos and poverty. Sultanov refuted rumors that Azerbaijani rule would bring massacres and subjugation of Armenians, citing the example of Karabakh. He also emphasized that Zangezur, like Karabakh, was dependent on the Yevlakh road and could not exist in isolation:

I appeal to you, the people of Zangezur—workers and peasants... show that you have no connection to anarchist and adventurist elements. I guarantee the inviolability of your personility and property, and I have always kept my word. However, if you continue to support criminal elements, I have sufficient forces to compel you to recognize the authority of the Azerbaijani Republic. In that case, the responsibility for bloodshed will lie with you.

During the same period, in mid-October, Azerbaijan rejected a plan proposed by Colonel Rey, the American representative in the South Caucasus, to establish a neutral zone in Sharur-Nakhichevan. The initial agreement had been contingent upon the withdrawal of Armenian forces from Zangezur, but Armenian military buildup in the region was observed.

Meanwhile, in Goris, the Armenian administration and military command prepared for conflict. The regional government declared that Zangezur would not suffer the same humiliating fate as Karabakh and announced a general mobilization on October 26. Intelligence reported that an Azerbaijani invasion was expected in early November.

On October 29, the commander of the Azerbaijani expeditionary forces, General Javad bey Shikhlinski, ordered an advance unit, led by Captain Ibrahimov, to approach Armenian positions near Tegh and deliver an ultimatum demanding the opening of the road to Goris. On November 3, Japheth (Hovhannes Paronyan) telegraphed Irevan, stating that military action was inevitable. The battle for Zangezur began within hours.

== Military operations ==
The operation to capture Zangezur began on November 4 (or November 3, according to some accounts) with Azerbaijani military forces concentrated in Karabakh. Simultaneously, an attack was launched from Nakhchivan, where local militias advanced toward Sisian. Meanwhile, two Turkish platoons attempted to reach the remaining Azerbaijani centers in central Zangezur. Additionally alongside Turkish forces, the Azerbaijanis were supplemented by auxiliary Kurdish cavalry. The first day of fighting ended with several defeats for the defenders.

On the morning of November 6, Armenian militias, led by Colonel Shahmazyan, dislodged Sultanov's militias from the Kechal-Dala mountain passes and the area near Lake Gazıgöl, placing General-Major Yadigarov’s group in a precarious position. The Armenians reportedly utilized two howitzers and, according to Yadigarov, included regular troops in their ranks. The rapid retreat of the militia forces, who had completely lost cohesion, combined with the threat of an encirclement of Yadigarov's right flank, prevented him from advancing to capture Khanazakh (present-day Khnatsakh). By noon, his forces held positions in Khoznar and the Dagmelik heights.

At dawn on the 6th, Colonel Levestam's group forced the Armenians from its position on the southern bank of the Zabugh, advancing to a point three versts ahead by 4 p.m., preparing to attack the position along the Aravus–Tegh line and to the south. Two howitzers and four mountain guns crossed to the southern side of the Zabugh and took position there.

The most intense resistance was encountered by the Zakataly Regiment. The attacking units ascended almost vertical cliffs under heavy rifle and machine-gun fire from the Armenians. However, Azerbaijani artillery successfully dislodged the Armenians from their trenches. According to General Shikhlinski, the Armenians suffered significant losses, with 18 bodies counted at a single location. Levestam's group suffered two killed and 18 wounded, while Yadigarov's losses remain unknown.

On November 7, Shikhlinski ordered Levestam to capture Dyg and fortify his position, while Yadigaryov was tasked with taking Khanazakh and supporting Levestam.

On the same day, Levestam's group, supported by six mountain guns and two howitzers, launched an offensive on Dyg. On the Armenian side, two light artillery pieces were initially engaged, joined by four howitzers at 10 a.m., which focused their fire on the Azerbaijani artillery. The Azerbaijani artillery managed to destroy the Armenians’ light guns and then directed its fire toward the howitzers. Around 10 a.m., Armenian cavalry, mistakenly identified by the Azerbaijanis as their own forces, launched a flank attack from the left, causing confusion among the soldiers of the Zakataly Regiment. The attack was repelled thanks to an officer from the Ganja Regiment's machine-gun unit, who directed fire at the cavalry's flank. Following this, Armenian infantry attacked the Azerbaijani left flank but was driven back by two companies from the Javanshir Regiment, which had been deployed from reserve. By 3 p.m., a significant concentration of Armenian infantry and cavalry was observed on the right flank of Levestam's group, forcing him to abandon the plan to capture Dyg. As darkness fell, the situation on the left flank became highly unstable, leading to anxiety among the soldiers. Due to the exhaustion of the troops and the realization that holding Dyg was unfeasible, Javad Bey Shikhlinski decided to withdraw the group to the northern bank of the Zabugh and return to their original positions.

A notable historian on the topic, Hovannisian, describes the conflict:

The clashes began on November 6, 1919, when Azerbaijani troops together with Kurdish Irregulars unleashed a series of infantry and cavalry attacks against local Armenian units seizing Vaghatur, Khnadsakh, Korindzor, Tegh and Khoznavar. The situation was extremely desperate for the Armenians, and most Armenians expected the region of Zangezur to fall to the army of Azerbaijan, which was by far superior in numbers, equipment and had the support of tens of thousands of local Muslim residents of Zangezur. The situation of the on-going clash would change however, following an counter offensive by the Armenian garrison of Goris numbering 3,000-5,000 troops under the command of Lieutenant Colonel Arsen Shahmazyan, Armenian artillery began a series of bombardments against the Azerbaijani troops concentrated around Vaghatur, which allowed Armenian troops to capture the strategic location, from where they would begin an offensive against the Azerbaijani troops around Tegh and Zabukh, as the highly moralised Armenians would inflict several hundreds of casualties against the Azerbaijanis in the process. The Armenians had furthermore captured 100,000 rounds of ammunition and six machine guns near Khoznavar, whilst having neutralised two cannons and over twenty machine guns. By the 9th of November the entirety of the Azerbaijani army was in full scale retreat to the Karabakh region, with their ranks left in utter disarray. This important victory moralised not only the Armenian troops, but also the Armenian people within Zangezur, who greatly celebrated this victory against Azerbaijan, this event would mark the end of Azerbaijani attempts at seizing Zangezur.

According to Azerbaijani sources, their losses amounted to 45 killed and 75 wounded.

== Aftermath ==
The Zangezur crisis, which only became widely known by the public towards the end of the operations due to the remoteness of the conflict zone, threatened to engulf all the Transcaucasian republics. In response, Allied representatives and the Georgian government sought to put an end to the hostilities. On November 13, Allied representatives in Transcaucasia, Colonel Rey and Oliver Wardrop, warned both sides that their actions would harm their positions at the Versailles Conference if military operations were not permanently ceased. The Armenian side immediately expressed readiness for peace negotiations, accusing Azerbaijan of duplicity by continuing military operations during bilateral discussions. Meanwhile, Armenian forces under the command of Garegin Nzhdeh, who had been appointed to Zangezur in August 1919, launched operations against Azerbaijani villages that had supported incursions in the Meghri and Kapan areas, at the heart of Zangezur. As a result, Nzhdeh's forces captured Kajaran, Shabadin, Okchi, Pirudan, and several other villages, where defenders were massacred, and the local population was expelled.

On November 16, 1919, Oliver Wardrop telegraphed London, reporting that the Armenians, having achieved initial success, were now seeking peace before the situation turned against them. Wardrop attributed blame to both Armenians, who had provoked the Azerbaijanis by harsh treatment and the expulsion of thousands of Muslims from their homes, and to Azerbaijanis, who, influenced by Turkish advisors, had sought to seize Zangezur with a sudden offensive. However, Wardrop doubted the involvement of Azerbaijani Prime Minister Nasib bey Yusifbeyli in orchestrating the campaign.

On the same day, Colonel Rey demanded that Yusifbeyli and Armenian Prime Minister Alexander Khatisian meet with him on November 20. The Zangezur expedition, previously denied by Azerbaijan's Ministry of Foreign Affairs, had become public knowledge, forcing Yusifbeyli to accept the invitation and acknowledge the participation of regular Azerbaijani troops in the Zangezur conflict. Yusifbeyli, however, placed responsibility on Armenia, accusing it of inciting the Zangezur Armenians to rebellion, which had compelled the Azerbaijani government to assist Governor-General Sultanov in dealing with pro-Bolshevik insurgents, preventing further destruction, and facilitating the repatriation of refugees.

On November 19, Yusifbeyli and Khatisian met in Tiflis, and after several days of negotiations, with the involvement of Colonel Rey and Georgian Foreign Minister Evgeni Gegechkori, a peace agreement was signed on November 23.

Nevertheless, hostilities in Zangezur did not cease. Nzhdeh continued military operations against Azerbaijani villages in central Zangezur, and ethnic cleansing of Azerbaijani populations by Dashnak leaders persisted. The Zangezur question remained unresolved.

== Sources ==
- Hovannisian, Richard (1971a), The Republic of Armenia: The first year, 1918-1919, University of California Press, ISBN 978-0-520-01805-1
- Hovannisian, Richard (1971b), The Republic of Armenia: From Versailles to London, 1919-1920, University of California Press, ISBN 978-0-520-01805-1
- Hovannisian, Richard (2007), Международные отношения республики Армения 1918—1922 гг. г. пер. Г.Махмурян, Тигран Мец, ISBN 978-99941-0-224-2
- Азербайджанская Демократическая Республика (1918-1920), Армия (Документы и материалы) (1998), Азербайджанская Демократическая Республика (1918-1920), Армия (Документы и материалы) (PDF), Баку
- Azərbaycan Xalq Cümhuriyyəti Ensiklopediyası (2005), Azərbaycan Xalq Cümhuriyyəti Ensiklopediyası: II cild, Baku
- Петросян, Гегам (2012), Отношения Республики Армения с Россией (1918—1920 гг.)
