= 1st Infantry Division (Azerbaijan) =

- Azerbaijani: Birinci Piyada Diviziyası
- Active: 1917 – May 16, 1920
- Country: Azerbaijan Democratic Republic
- Branch: National Army of the Azerbaijan Democratic Republic
- Type: Infantry
- Role: Infantry division
- Part of: Azerbaijani Special Corps
- Garrison/HQ: Baku
- Engagements: Armenian–Azerbaijani War; Battle of Baku; Zangezur Expedition; 1920 Ganja revolt

Commanders
- Commander: Major General Khalil bey Talyshkinski
- Notable commanders: Colonel Jamil Jahid Bey; Major General Ibrahim agha Usubov; Major General Muhammad Mirza Gajar; Major General Suleyman bey Efendiyev; Major General Javad bey Shikhlinsky

1st Infantry Division (Azerbaijani: Birinci Piyada Diviziyası) was an infantry division in the National Army of the Azerbaijan Democratic Republic.

== History ==
The division was originally formed in late 1917. Formation of the division was carried out by its commander, Khalil bey Talyshkinski, structured within the Azerbaijani Special Corps (ASC). However, because the formation of Azerbaijani military units did not meet the necessary requirements, ASC and the 1st Infantry Division were disorganized and units within these structures were subordinated to the Islamic Army of the Caucasus on August 13, 1918.

The reorganization of the infantry divisions and ASC started after the successful liberation of Baku. Colonel Jamil Jahid Bey was appointed the division's commander, and the 1st, 2nd and 3rd Infantry Regiments joined the division on September 23, 1918. The Caucasus Army Group's 5th Caucasian Infantry Division's 9th Infantry Regiment also joined this division in order to accelerate its reorganization. Major General Ibrahim agha Usubov from Karabakh was appointed the division's commander after the Ottoman army left Azerbaijan in mid-November 1918.

=== 1919 ===
General Suleyman bey Efendiyev was appointed the commander of the division on January 1, 1919. Javad bey Shikhlinsky was appointed the commander of the division after the death of Efendiyev on February 21, 1919.

By the decision of the Council of Ministers dated June 25, 1919, Javad bey Shikhlinsky was awarded the rank of Major General for his services in the formation and strengthening of the division. 1st Javanshir, 2nd Zaqatala and 3rd Ganja Infantry Regiments were part of the division and they were situated in Ganja. The division's regiments were usually in line of contact with the Armenian forces. They fought in Zangezur, Karabakh, and took part in consolidation of the northern defense systems.

=== 1920 ===
After the Red Army invasion of Azerbaijan in 1920, 1st and 2nd Infantry Divisions were merged into Unified Red Division of the Workers and Peasants by the order of the People's Military and Naval Commissar on May 16, 1920.

== See also ==
- Müsüslü Military Detachment

== Sources ==
- Suleymanov, Mehman (1998). Azərbaycan Ordusu: 1918-1920 (in Azerbaijani). Baku: Hərbi Nəşriyyat.
- Nazirli, Shamistan (1995). Cümhuriyyət generalları (in Azerbaijani). Baku: Hərbi Nəşriyyat. Archived from the original on 2020-03-25.
