= Pirdaudan =

- Location within Armenia Location within Syunik Province
- Coordinates: 39°15′N 46°08′E
- Country: Armenia
- Marz (Province): Syunik
- Time zone: UTC+4 ( )
  - Summer (DST): UTC+5 ( )

Pirdaudan (also, Pirudan and Pirdoudan) is a town in the Syunik Province of Armenia.

== See also ==
- Syunik Province
