= Military School of the Azerbaijan Democratic Republic =

The Military School of the Azerbaijan Democratic Republic (Azerbaijani: Azərbaycan Xalq Cümhuriyyətinin Hərbi) was the military academy of the Azerbaijan Democratic Republic and the Azerbaijani National Army. In the years it existed, it trained military personnel in a number of specializations. The school operated for only 4 months.

== History ==
=== Establishment ===
On 6 February 1918, the Muslim Corps commander, Lieutenant-General Ali-Agha Shikhlinski, in a letter to the Transcaucasian Commissariat asked for the opening of a military school in Baku under the 1st Muslim Division. The Declaration of Independence of Azerbaijan (adopted on 28 May 1918) stated that Azerbaijan must have a regular army to protect itself from foreign interference and to neutralize internal enemy forces. By the fall of that year, the many structural institutions and units of the army were established, including a military school. In March 1918, a military school was opened, with officer Cahangir Zeynaloğlu being appointed as chief. After the March Days, it was decided to move the school to Ganja. The base of the school, which arrived in Ganja on 2 April, was first located in the building of the railway school, and then in the building of the local art school by 9 April. In Ganja, the military school was headed by Colonel Atif Bey of the Ottoman Army.

=== Operations ===
This educational institution was called the "School of Ensigns". When Russian-Armenian units led by Stepan Shaumian at the Armenian Revolutionary Federation operated in the country, officers of the Ganja Military School involved supporting the nation, leaving the school to be temporarily closed. By June 1918, the school had resumed its activities, although the admission rate very low. Those who studied at the school were called junkers. In October, the first graduation took place with notable generals and politicians being in attendance such as Nasib Yusifbeyli and the father of the Chief of Staff of the Islamic Army of the Caucasus. On 1 December 1918, the status of the school was changed and the ensign school was established. Later, a military engineering school was opened on the basis of that school, operating first in Ganja and then in Hacıkənd. In addition, schools were established to train military railwaymen and military paramedics. In the meantime, the Ganja Ensign School trained young cadets all of Azerbaijan.

=== Later years ===
On 6 September 1919, the Ensign School was moved to Baku and was housed in a military hospital. On 31 October 31, by the order of the Minister of War Samad bey Mehmandarov, the Ensign School was transformed into the Military School. On 25 May 1920, at the start of the Soviet era in Azerbaijan, the Azerbaijan United Military School was established on the basis of the Military School. This would later become the Transcaucasian Military Training School and the Sergo Ordzhonikidze Baku Infantry School of the Soviet Red Army.

== See also ==
- Baku Higher Combined Arms Command School
- Ottoman Military College
