= Ganja State Puppet Theatre =

Coordinates: 40.6706°N 46.3609°E

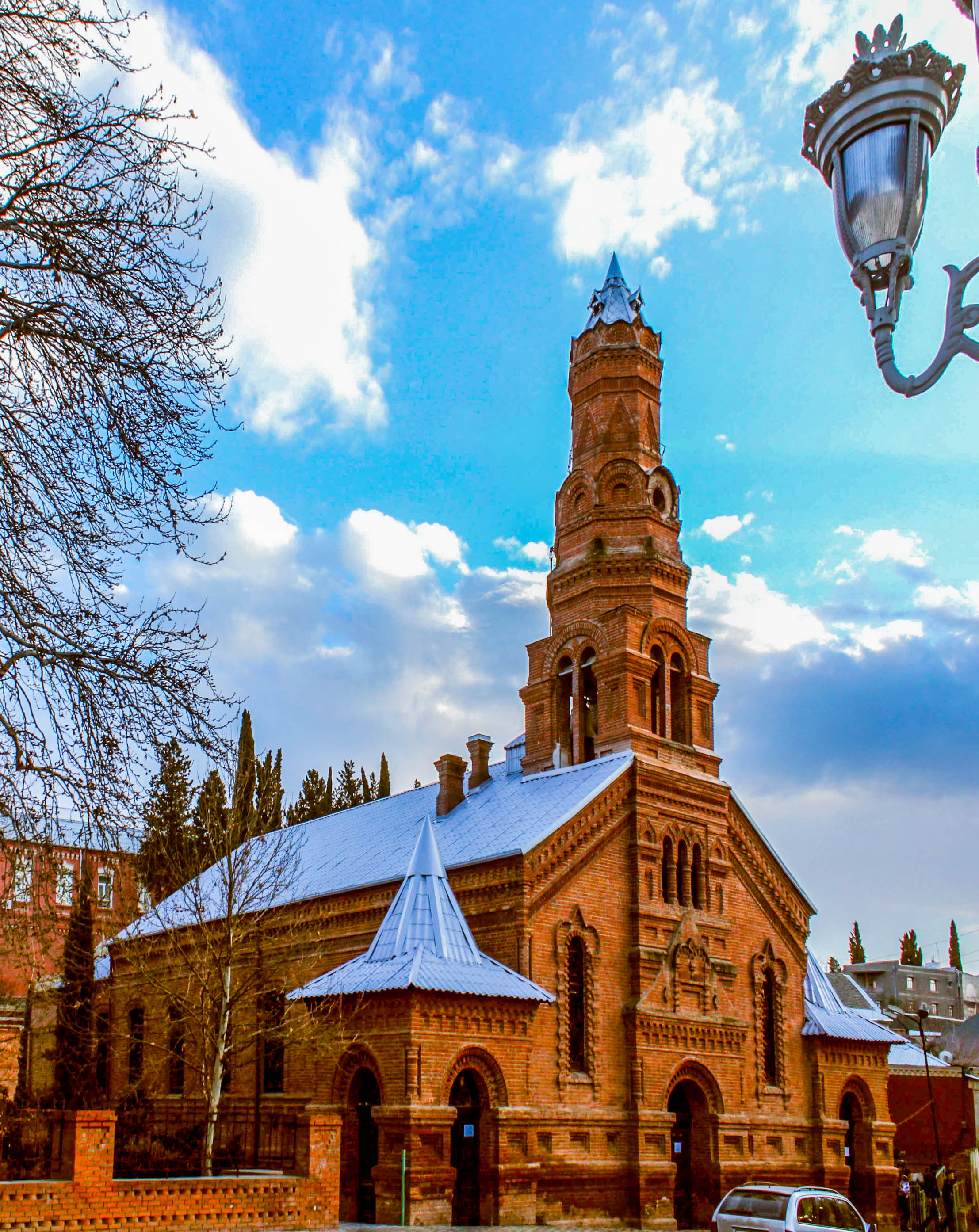
Ganja State Puppet Theatre

Ganja State Puppet Theatre (Azerbaijani: Gəncə Dövlət Kukla Teatrı) is located on Ahmad Jamil Street 105 in Ganja, Azerbaijan.

It was built in 1902 as a Russian Orthodox church in honour of Saints Cyril and Methodius and lately was converted into Ganja State Puppet Theatre.

== Overview ==
Baked bricks were basically used in construction. Onion domes also prove that the building belonged to the Russian Orthodox church. The total area of the building is 650 m.^{2} with a hall, a lobby and 15 rooms. Ganja State Puppet Theater operates in this building which is currently on the list of Christian religion monuments.

Ganja State Puppet Theater was established according to the Decree №299 of Council of Ministers of Azerbaijan SSR in September, 1986. Formerly the theater functioned as a public theater and more than 100 spectacles had been prepared there before receiving “State” status.

== History ==
It is assumed that the church used by German colonists until the early 1940s, but there is no documentary evidence of that. There is also no evidence that this church was a Lutheran church, given the fact that during these years there was no German Lutheran Community in Kirovabad, where an insignificant number of Germans (50-100 people) lived. On 18 September 1986, by order of the Cabinet of Ministers of the Azerbaijan SSR, the building was handed over to the use of the Ganja State Puppet Theatre which operates to this day.

== See also ==
- Baku Puppet Theatre
- Religion in Azerbaijan
- Caucasus Russians
