= Ganja Men's Gymnasium =

Educational institution in Ganja, Azerbaijan

- Gəncə kişi gimnaziyası
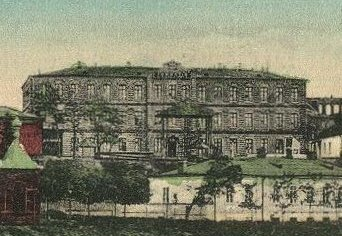
- The gymnasium before 1900.
- Former name: Yelizavetpol Men's Gymnasium
- Location: 60 Mirza Abbas Abbaszaddeh Street, Yelizavetpol (Ganja), Elizavetpol uezd, Elizavetpol Governorate, Russian Empire; Azerbaijan
- Language: Russian (main; until 1918); Azerbaijani (main; until 1920)

Ganja Men's Gymnasium (Azerbaijani: Gəncə kişi gimnaziyası, Russian: Гянджинская мужская гимназия), or Elizavetpol Men's Gymnasium (Azerbaijani: Yelizavetpol kişi gimnaziyası, Russian: Елизаветпольская мужская гимназия), was a men-only gymnasium that existed in the city of Yelisavetpol (modern-day Ganja) from 1881 to 1920. The faculty of Agriculture and Management of the Azerbaijan State Agricultural University currently operates in the building of the former gymnasium.

== History ==
The three-storey building of the gymnasium was built in 1848 in the Gothic style. The classical gymnasium was established in 1870 on the basis of Elizavetpol uezd School. It started to operate as a men's gymnasium in 1881.

With the Azerbaijan Democratic Republic (ADR) declaring its independence, the gymnasium was renamed to Ganja Men's Gymnasium. In 1919, German, French, Turkish, Armenian, Latin and Polish language courses were organized at the gymnasium. During ADR rule, the number of Muslim students in the school increased significantly, and in 1919, parallel departments were opened in the preparatory courses.

The gymnasium was closed in 1920. From 1920 to 1930, there was a secondary technical vocational school in the building of the gymnasium. In 1931, the building of the gymnasium was transferred to the balance of the Agricultural Institute and became the building of the faculty of Agrarian Economy. The faculty of Agriculture and Management of the Azerbaijan State Agricultural University currently operates in the building of the former gymnasium.

Azerbaijani authorities stated that the building was damaged as result of Armenian shelling in 2020 Nagorno-Karabakh War.

== Graduates ==
Graduates of the gymnasium were such historical personalities as the first prime minister and the minister of internal affairs of the ADR, Fatali Khan Khoyski, the minister of internal affairs of the ADR, Khalil bey Khasmammadov, minister of finance of the ADR, Nasib bey Yusifbeyli, the minister of labor and justice and minister of postal service and telegraph of the ADR, Aslan bey Safikurdski, the Governor General of Ganja and minister of healthcare of the ADR, Khudadat bey Rafibeyli, the deputy Speaker of National Assembly of the ADR, Hasan bey Aghayev, the Russian-Azerbaijani statesman Adil Khan Ziyadkhanov, and others.

== Sources ==
- Tahirzadeh, N. K. (1983). "Истории среднего образования в Азербайджане во второй половине XIX века". Материалы научной сессии, посвящённой итогам научно-исследовательских работ музея за 1892 год (in Russian). Baku: Elm. p. 70.
- Nazarli, A. E. (2008). Musayeva, T. A. (ed.). Народное образование в Азербайджанской Республике (1918-1920 гг.) (in Russian). Baku: Nurlan.
- Фатали Хан Хойский. Жизнь и деятельность (документы и материалы) (in Russian). 1998.
- Yamayeva, L. A. (1998). Мусульманские депутаты Государственной думы России 1906-1917 гг: сборник документов и материалов (in Russian). Ufa: Kitap. pp. 309–376.
- Ahmadov, H. (2014). Azərbaycan məktəb və pedaqoji fikir tarixi (in Azerbaijani). Baku: Elm və təhsil. pp. 333–336.
- Aliyeva, S. (1993). Так это было: национальные репрессии в СССР 1919-1952 годы (in Russian). Moscow: Insan International Cultural Foundation. p. 35.
- Basayev, I. D.; Kozlov, A. G. (2002). Дальстрой и Севвостлаг НКВД СССР в цифрах и документах: В 2-х ч. Ч. 2 (1941-1945) (in Russian). Magadan: СВКНИИ ДВО РАН. pp. 397–428.
