= Cabinets of the Azerbaijan Democratic Republic =

The Azerbaijan Democratic Republic (ADR) is the first independent Republic, proclaimed on May 28, 1918, in the territory of the present Azerbaijan Republic. The republic collapsed on 28 April 1920, after the 11th Red Army entered Baku. On 28 May is celebrated as the Republic Day in Azerbaijan since 1990.

== First Cabinet ==
The government of the ADR was the supreme executive body of the Republic. The first cabinet of the government was established on May 28, 1918, immediately after the proclamation of independence. The Cabinet was dissolved on June 17, 1918. The cabinet was led by Fatali Khan Khoyski.

- Chairman of the Council of Ministers and Minister of Internal Affairs – Fatali Khan Khoyski (Independent)
- Minister of Defense – Khosrov bey Sultanov (Musavat)
- Minister of Foreign Affairs – Mammad Hasan Hajinski (Musavat)
- Minister of Finance and Public Education – Nasib bey Yusifbeyli (Musavat)
- Minister of Justice – Khalil bey Khasmammadov (Musavat)
- Minister of Trade and Industry – Mammad Yusif Jafarov (Independent, then Musavat)
- Minister of Agriculture and Labour – Akbar agha Sheykhulislamov (Hummet)
- Minister of Transportation, Postal Service and Telegraph – Khudadat bey Malik-Aslanov (Independent)
- Minister of State Control – Jamo bey Hajinski (Muslim Socialist Bloc)

== Second Cabinet ==
The second government cabinet was created immediately after the collapse of the first cabinet, on June 17, 1918.

- Chairman of the Council of Ministers and Minister of Justice – Fatali Khan Khoyski (Independent)
- Minister of Foreign Affairs (also acting Minister of State Control) – Mammad Hasan Hajinski (Musavat)
- Minister of Public Education and Religious Affairs – Nasib bey Yusifbeyli (Musavat)
- Minister of Internal Affairs – Behbud Khan Javanshir (Independent)
- Minister of Agriculture – Khosrov bey Sultanov (Musavat)
- Minister of Healthcare and Social Security – Khudadat bey Rafibeyli (Independent)
- Minister of Transportation (also acting Minister of Postal Service and Telegraph) – Khudadat bey Malik-Aslanov (Independent)
- Minister of Trade and Industry (also acting Minister of Food Provisions) – Agha Ashurov (Independent)
- Minister of Finance – Abdulali bey Amirjanov (Independent)
- Minister without portfolio – Alimardan bey Topchubashov (Independent)
- Minister without portfolio – Musa bey Rafiyev (Musavat)
- Minister without portfolio – Khalil bey Khasmammadov (Musavat)

The composition of the cabinet was changed on October 6, 1918. The Cabinet was recalled on December 7, 1918. The cabinet was led by Fatali Khan Khoyski.

- Chairman of the Council of Ministers – Fatali Khan Khoyski (Independent)
- Minister of Trade, Industry and internal affairs – Behbud Khan Javanshir (Independent)
- Minister of Foreign Affairs – Alimardan bey Topchubashov (Independent)
- Minister of Finance – Mammad Hasan Hajinski (Musavat)
- Minister of Public Education – Nasib bey Yusifbeyli (Musavat)
- Minister of Transportation – Khudadat bey Malik-Aslanov (Independent)
- Minister of Agriculture and State Property – Khosrov bey Sultanov (Musavat)
- Minister of Public Health – Khudadat bey Rafibeyli (Independent)
- Minister of Postal Service and Telegraph – Agha Ashurov (Independent)
- Minister of Social Security and Religious Affairs – Musa bey Rafiyev (Musavat)
- Commissioner on Military Affairs – Ismail Khan Ziyadkhanov (Independent)
- Minister of State Control – Abdulali bey Amirjanov (Independent)

== Third Cabinet ==
The third government cabinet was created 19 days after the collapse of the second cabinet of the government, on December 26, 1918. The cabinet was led by Fatali Khan Khoysky.

- Chairman of the Council of Ministers and Minister of Foreign Affairs – Fatali Khan Khoyski (Independent)
- Minister of Internal Affairs – Khalil bey Khasmammadov (Independent)
- Minister of Finance – I. Protasov (Slavic-Russian Society)
- Minister of Transportation – Khudadat bey Malik-Aslanov (Independent)
- Minister of Justice – Teymur bey Makinsky (Independent)
- Minister of Education and Religious Affairs – Nasib bey Yusifbeyli (Musavat)
- Minister of Postal Service, Telegraph and Labour – Aslan bey Safikurdski (Muslim Socialist Bloc)
- Minister of Defense – Samad bey Mehmandarov (Independent)
- Minister of Social Security – Rustam Khan Khoyski (Independent)
- Minister of Public Health – Yevsey Gindes (Slavic-Russian Society)
- Minister of Trade and Industry – Mirza Asadullayev (Independent)
- Minister of State Control – Mammad Hasan Hajinski (since January 16, 1919 – Alaigha Hasanov)
- Minister of Food Provisions – Konstantin Lisgar (Slavic-Russian Society)
- Minister of Agriculture – Khosrov bey Sultanov (Musavat)

== Fourth Cabinet ==
The fourth government cabinet of the Republic was created on April 14, 1919. The Cabinet was headed by Nasib bey Yusifbeyli. The composition canceled on December 22, 1919.

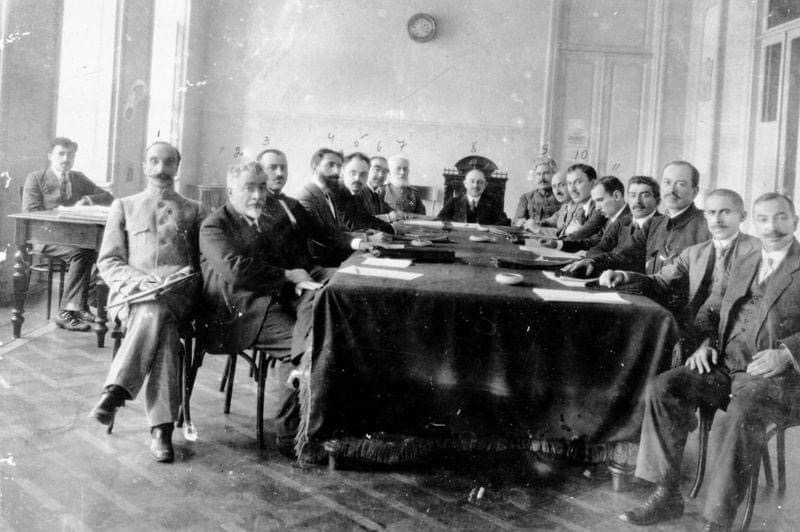
Meeting of the Cabinet of Ministers. May 27, 1919

- Chairman of the Council of Ministers and Minister of Internal Affairs – Nasib bey Yusifbeyli (Musavat)
- Minister of Internal Affairs (since October, 1919) – Mammad Hasan Hajinski (Musavat)
- Minister of Finance – Aliagha Hasanov (Independent)
- Minister of Trade and Industry – Agha Aminov (Independent)
- Minister of Foreign Affairs – Mammad Yusif Jafarov (Musavat)
- Minister of Transportation – Khudadat bey Malik-Aslanov (Independent)
- Minister of Postal Service and Telegraph – Jamo bey Hajinski (Muslim Socialist Bloc)
- Minister of Defense – Samad bey Mehmandarov (Independent)
- Minister of Social Security – Victor Klenevski (Slavic-Russian Society)
- Minister of Health – Abraham Dastakov (Dashnaktsutiun)
- Minister of Education and Religious Affairs – Rashid Khan Kaplanov (Ahrar)
- Minister of Agriculture and State Property – Aslan bey Gardashov (Ahrar)
- Minister without portfolio – Khoren Amaspyur (Dashnaktsutiun)
- Minister of State Control – Nariman bey Narimanbeyov (Musavat)
- Minister of Justice and Labour – Aslan bey Safikurdski (Muslim Socialist Bloc)

== Fifth Cabinet ==
The fifth composition of the government cabinet was created on December 22, 1919, and was led by Nasib Bey Yusifeyli. The composition cancelled on March 30, 1920.

- Chairman of the Council of Ministers – Nasib bey Yusifbeyli (Musavat)
- Minister of Foreign Affairs – Fatali Khan Khoyski (Independent)
- Minister of Defense – Samad bey Mehmandarov (Independent)
- Minister of Internal Affairs – Mammadhasan Hajinski
- Minister of Justice – Khalil bey Khasmammadov (Musavat)
- Minister of Finance – Rashid Khan Kaplanov (Ahrar Party)
- Minister of Education and Religious Affairs – Hamid bey Shahtakhtinski (Ittihad)
- Minister of Labour and Agriculture – Ahmad bey Pepinov (Muslim Socialist Bloc)
- Minister of Transportation, (acting) Minister of Trade, Industry and Food Provisions – Khudadat bey Malik-Aslanov (Independent)
- Minister of Postal Service and Telegraph – Jamo bey Hajinski (Muslim Socialist Bloc)
- Minister of Social Welfare and Health – Musa bey Rafiyev (Musavat)
- Minister of State Control – Heybetgulu bey Mammadbayov (Ittihad)

== Gallery ==
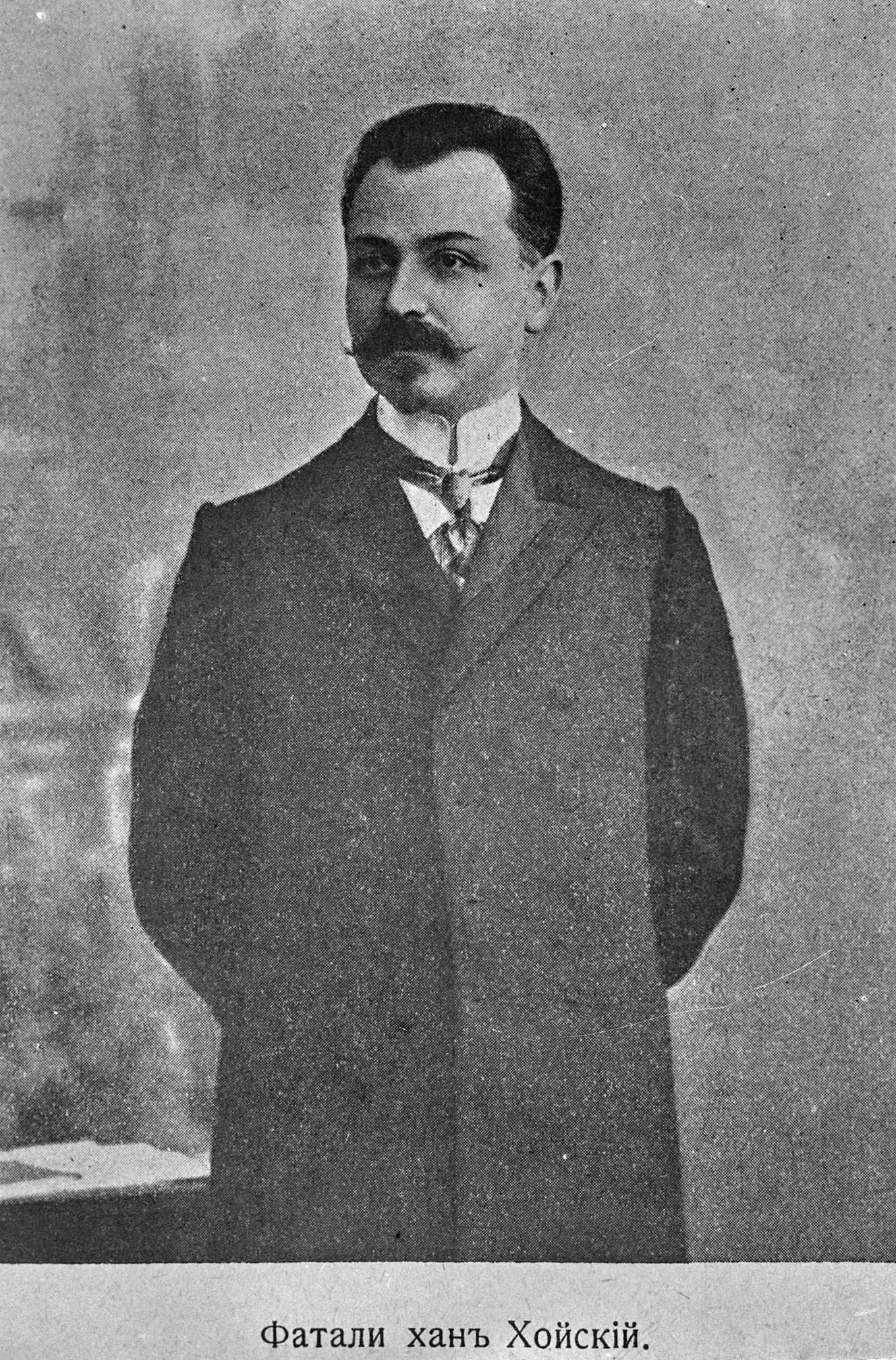
Fatali Khan Khoysky

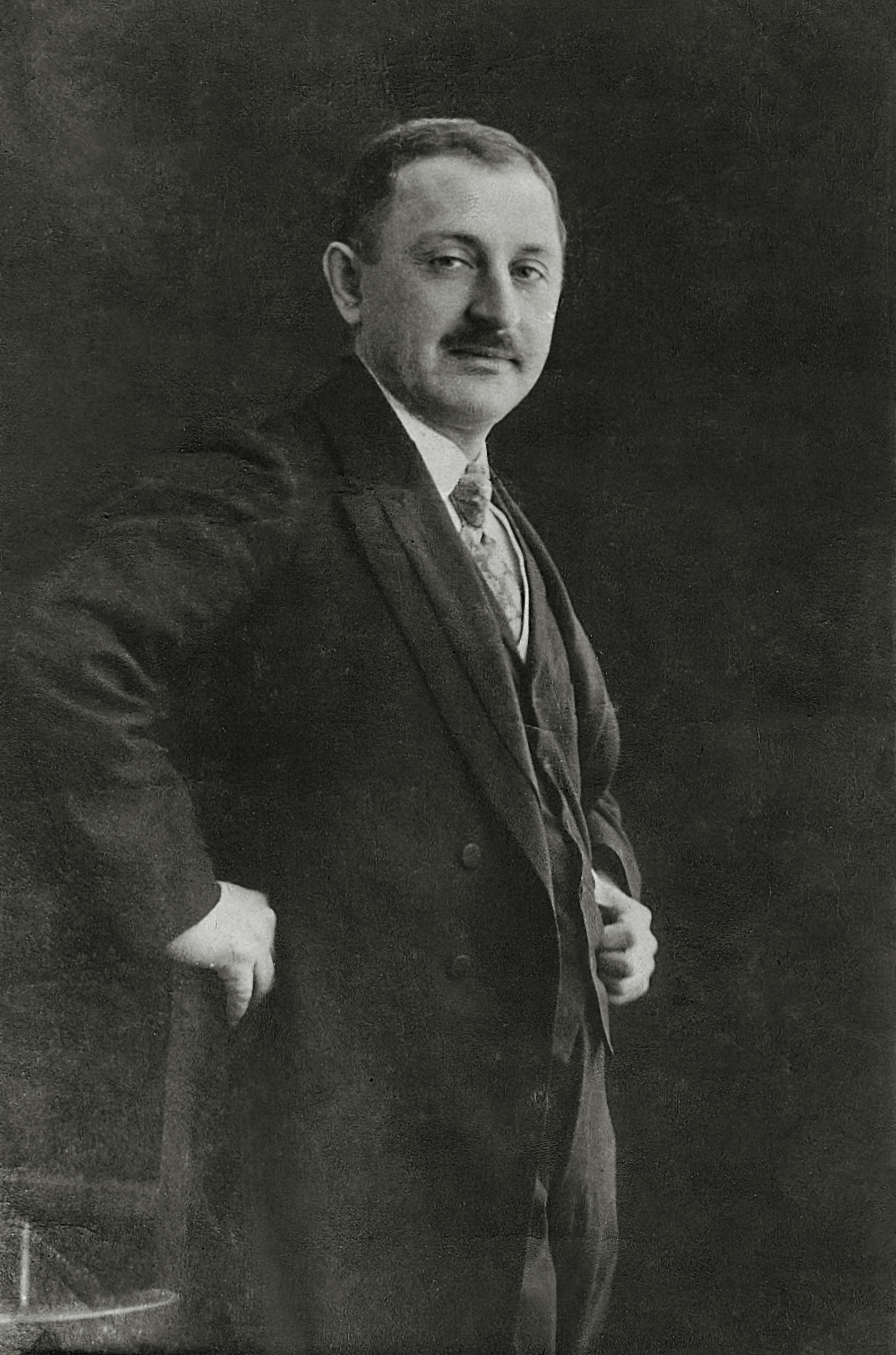
Nasib bey Yusifbeyli

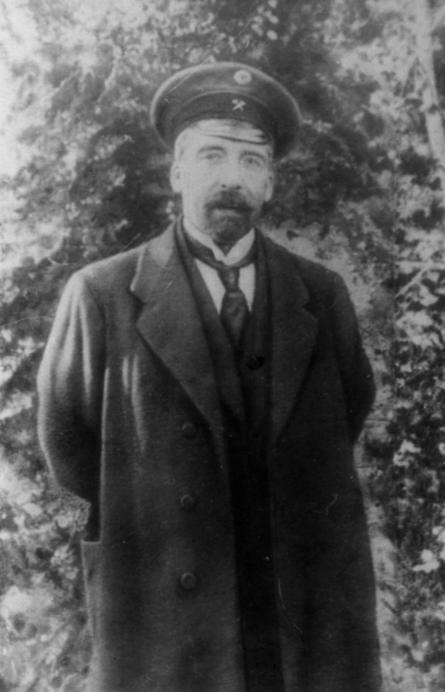
Mammad Hasan Hajinski

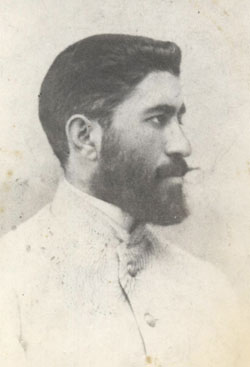
Khosrov bey Sultanov

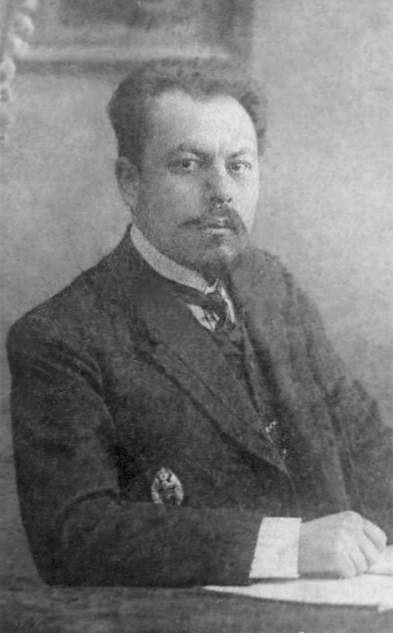
Khudadat bey Rafibeyli

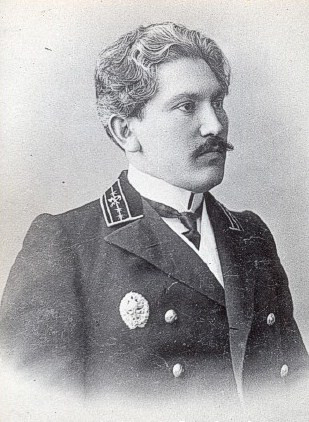
Khudadat bey Malik-Aslanov

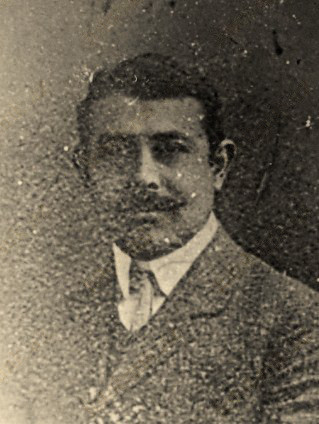
Agha Ashurov

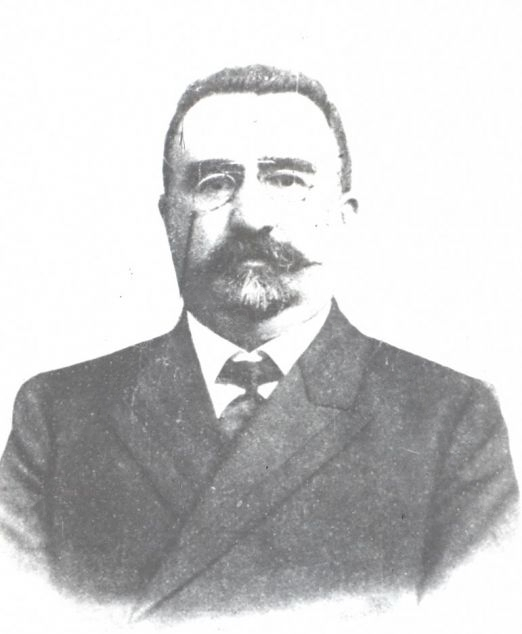
Alimardan bey Topchubashov

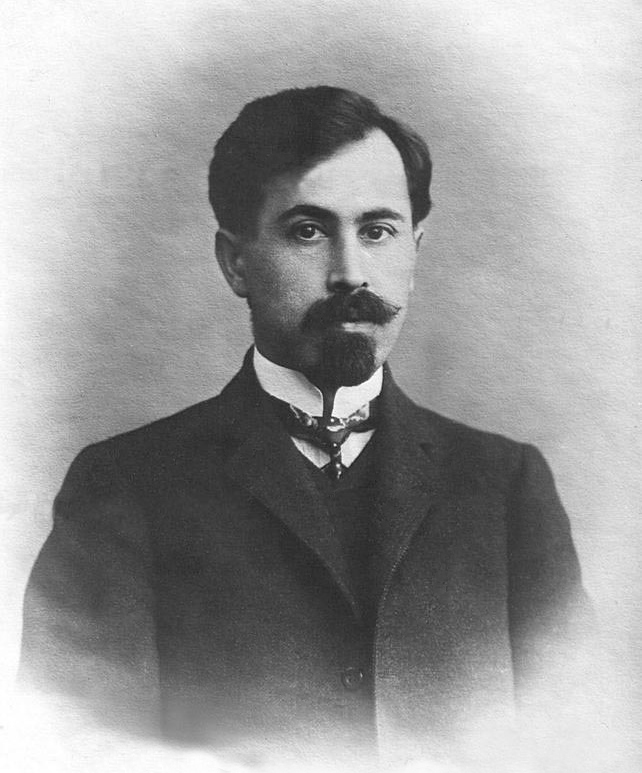
Khalil bey Khasmammadov

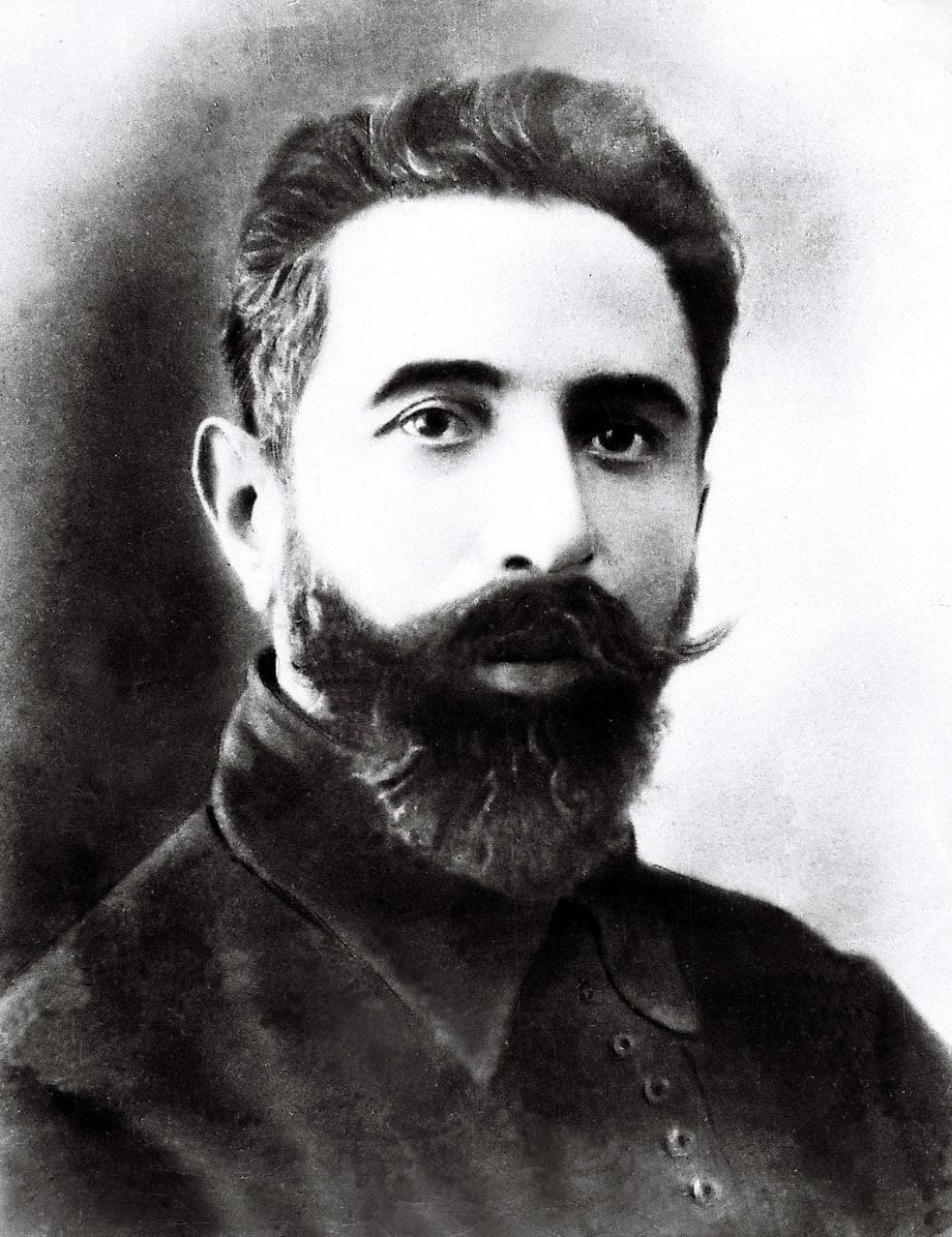
Aslan bey Safikurdski

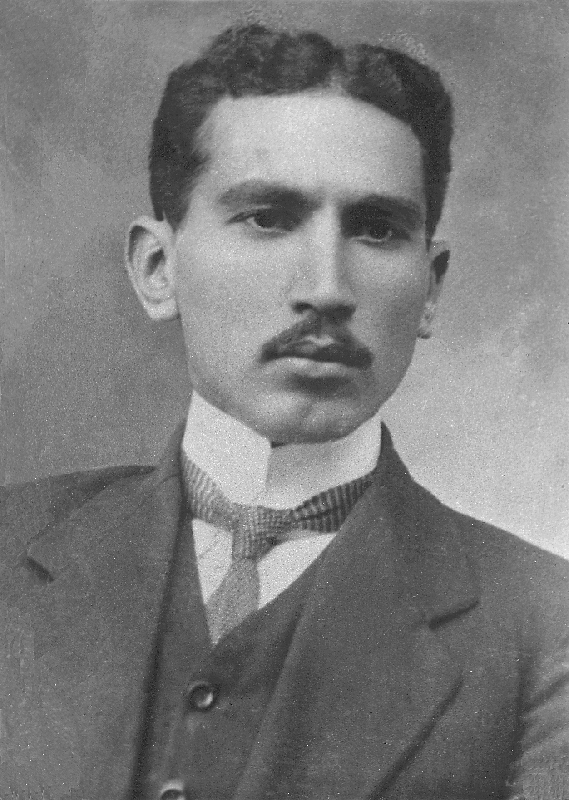
Nariman bey Narimanbeyov

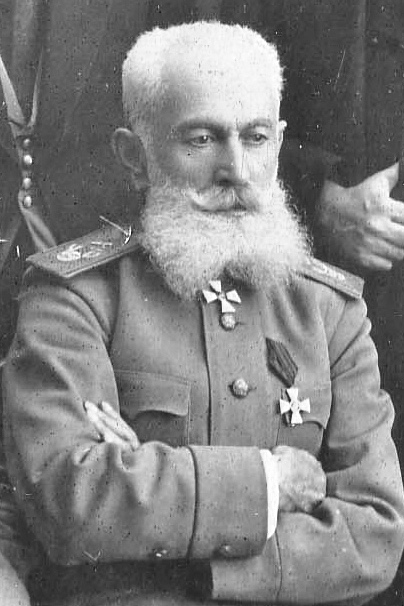
Samad bey Mehmandarov

== See also ==
Azerbaijan Democratic Republic
