= First cabinet of the Azerbaijan Democratic Republic =

The first cabinet of the Azerbaijan Democratic Republic governed the Azerbaijan Democratic Republic (ADR) between May 28, 1918, and June 17, 1918. It was formed after proclamation of independence of Azerbaijan on May 28, 1918, and was led by Prime Minister of Azerbaijan Fatali Khan Khoyski with the following composition:

| State Agency | Minister | Period | Party |
|---|---|---|---|
| Prime Minister | Fatali Khan Khoyski | May 28, 1918 – April 14, 1919 | Independent |
| Minister of Foreign Affairs | Mammad Hasan Hajinski | May 28, 1918 – October 6, 1918 | Musavat |
| Minister of Defense | Khosrov bey Sultanov | May 28, 1918 – June 11, 1918 | Musavat |
| Minister of Industry and Trade | Mammad Yusif Jafarov | May 28, 1918 – June 17, 1918 | Musavat |
| Minister of Internal Affairs | Fatali Khan Khoyski | May 28, 1918 – June 17, 1918 | Independent |
| Minister of Justice | Khalil Khasmammadov | May 28, 1918 – June 17, 1918 | Musavat |
| Minister of Finance and Public Education | Nasib Yusifbeyli | May 28, 1918 – June, 1918 | Musavat |
| Minister of Transportation, Postal Service and Telegraph | Khudadat bey Malik-Aslanov | 28 May 1918 – 28 April 1920 | Independent |
| Minister of Agriculture | Akbar agha Sheykhulislamov | May 28, 1918 – June 17, 1918 | Hummet |
| State Controller | Jamo bey Hajinski | May 28, 1918 – June 17, 1918 | Muslim Socialist Bloc |

== See also ==
- Second cabinet of the Azerbaijan Democratic Republic
- Third cabinet of the Azerbaijan Democratic Republic
- Cabinets of the Azerbaijan Democratic Republic (1918–1920)
- Cabinet of Azerbaijan
