= Aslan bey Safikurdski =

Azerbaijani statesman

- Aslan bəy Səfikürdski
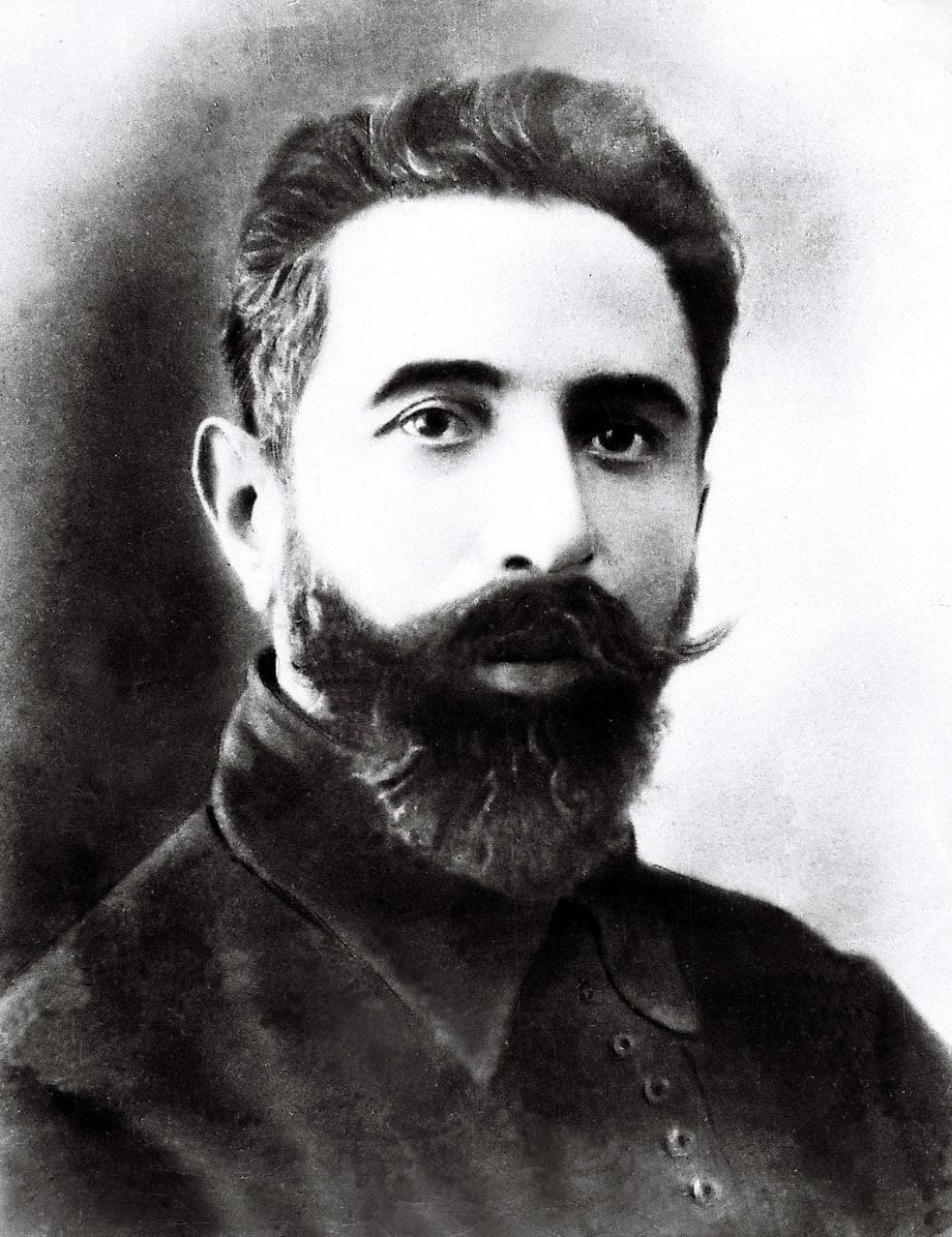

Minister of Labor and Justice of Azerbaijan Democratic Republic (ADR)
- In office April 14, 1919 – December 22, 1919
- President: Fatali Khan Khoyski Prime Minister, (Chairman of Azerbaijani Parliament)
- Preceded by: office established

Minister of Postal Service and Telegraph of Azerbaijan Democratic Republic (ADR)
- In office December 26, 1918 – March 14, 1919
- Preceded by: Agha Ashurov
- Succeeded by: Jamo bey Hajinski

Personal details
- Born: September 30, 1881 Safikurd, Elizavetpol uezd, Elizavetpol Governorate, Russian Empire
- Died: 1937 (aged 55–56) Baku, Azerbaijan SSR, USSR

Aslan bey Safikurdski Aghalar bey oghlu (Azerbaijani: Aslan bəy Səfikürdski Ağalar bəy oğlu; 1881–1937), also known as Aslan bey Safikurdlu (Azerbaijani: Aslan bəy Səfikürdlü) was an Azerbaijani statesman who served as the Minister of Labor and Justice of Azerbaijan Democratic Republic and Minister of Postal Service and Telegraph of Azerbaijan Democratic Republic, and was member of Azerbaijani National Council and later Parliament of Azerbaijan.

== Early years ==
Safikurdski was born in 1881, in the village Safikurd, in the Elizavetpol uezd of the Elizavetpol Governorate. After completing his studies at Ganja Gymnasium, he left for Saint Petersburg to attend Saint Petersburg State University. In 1905, he graduated from the Law Department of the university and returned to Ganja becoming the co-chair of Muslim Charity Society and chairman of Actors Society. Throughout his career, Safikurdski worked as the chief prosecutor in the Elizavetpol and Shusha uezds ("counties").

== Political career ==
With the establishment of Azerbaijan Democratic Republic, Safikurdski was elected member to the Executive Committee of Ganja Uyezd. On June 18, 1918, he was a part of the diplomatic delegation of Azerbaijan along with Musavat leader Mammad Amin Rasulzade, Khalil Khasmammadov, Akbar agha Sheykhulislamov which was sent to the conference in Istanbul to seek alliance with the Ottoman government. On December 26, 1918, when the third cabinet of ADR was formed, he was appointed Minister of Postal Service and Telegraph. The third government was dismissed on March 14, 1919. With formation of the fourth cabinet of ADR, Safikurdski was appointed the Minister of Labor and Justice. He's often credited with his labor reforms and salary increased for government workers.

After Bolshevik takeover of Azerbaijan on April 28, 1920, Safikurdski held various positions within the legal system of Azerbaijan, among them a position of a Deputy Commissar at the Ministry of Justice of Azerbaijan SSR and legal council to Azeroil Union. He died from long-term illness in 1937.

== See also ==
- Azerbaijani National Council
- Cabinets of Azerbaijan Democratic Republic (1918-1920)
- Current Cabinet of Azerbaijan Republic
