= Səfikürd =

Səfikürd or Safikyurd or Safykyurd may refer to:

- Səfikürd, Goranboy, Azerbaijan
- Səfikürd, Goygol, Azerbaijan
