= Third cabinet of the Azerbaijan Democratic Republic =

The third cabinet of the Azerbaijan Democratic Republic governed the Azerbaijan Democratic Republic (ADR) between December 26, 1918, and March 14, 1919. It was formed after the second cabinet of the Azerbaijan Democratic Republic dissolved on December 7, 1918, and was led by Prime Minister of Azerbaijan Fatali Khan Khoyski with the following composition:

State Agency	Minister	Period	Party
Prime Minister	Fatali Khan Khoyski	May 28, 1918 – April 14, 1919	Independent
Minister of Foreign Affairs	Fatali Khan Khoyski	December 26, 1918 – March 14, 1919	Independent
Minister of Education and Religious Affairs	Nasib Yusifbeyli	June 17, 1918 – March 4, 1919	Musavat
Minister of Internal Affairs	Khalil Khasmammadov	December 26, 1918 – June 16, 1919	Musavat
Minister of Defense	Samad bey Mehmandarov	December 26, 1918 – April 28, 1920	Independent
Minister of Healthcare	Yevsey Gindes	December 26, 1918 – March 14, 1919	Slavic-Russian Society
Minister of Transportation	Khudadat bey Malik-Aslanov	May 28, 1918 – April 28, 1920	Independent
Minister of Industry and Trade	Mirza Asadullayev	December 26, 1918 – March 14, 1919	Independent
Minister of Postal Service and Telegraph	Aslan bey Safikurdski	December 26, 1918 – March 14, 1919	Muslim Socialist Bloc
Minister of Finance	Ivan Protasov	December 26, 1918 - March 14, 1919	Slavic-Russian Society
Minister of Food Provisions	Konstantin Lisgar	December 26, 1918 - March 14, 1919	Slavic-Russian Society
State Controller	Mammad Hasan Hajinski	December 26, 1918 – March 14, 1919	Musavat
Minister of Social Security	Rustam Khan Khoyski	December 26, 1918 - March 14, 1919	Independent
Minister of Agriculture	Khosrov bey Sultanov	December 26, 1918 - March 14, 1919	Musavat
Head of State Security	Mammad Baghir Sheykhzamanli	June, 1919 - August, 1919	Musavat

== See also ==
- Cabinets of the Azerbaijan Democratic Republic (1918–1920)
- Cabinet of Azerbaijan
