= Turkic Federalist Party =

The Turkic Federalist Party (Azerbaijani: Türk Ədəmi-Mərkəziyyət Firqəsi) was an Azerbaijani political party established in Yelisavetpol (modern-day Ganja) and initially known as the Turkic Revolutionary Committee of Social Federalists and later as the Turkic Party of Decentralisation. It was mostly commonly referred to simply as Geyrat (Azeri for "honour").

In summer 1905, leaflets calling on the people of the Caucasus to secede from the Russian Empire were spread in the city of Yelisavetpol by an organisation which referred to itself as the Turkic Revolutionary Committee of Social Federalists. The leaflets listed continuing Russian occupation of the Caucasus and heavy taxes imposed by the Czarist government as main arguments for secession. In the same year, members of the Committee announced the formation of the Geyrat party of social federalist nature. The party was headed by Yelisavetpol-based lawyer Alakbar bey Rafibeyli. Within the next year, it gained support in Baku and Shusha, but was soon disestablished.

Geyrat was revived just after the February Revolution of 1917 by Nasib bey Yusifbeyli. Its main goal was to achieve autonomy for the Turkic-speaking peoples in the new federative Russia. Its political program was proclaimed in Yelisavetpol on 2 April 1917. On 17 June 1917, it merged with Musavat, thus becoming its right wing.

== See also ==
- Musavat
- Ittihad
- Ahrar Party (Azerbaijan)
- Hummet
- Hamid Bey Yusifbeyli
