= Jamo bey Hajinski =

Azerbaijani politician

Jamo bey Hajinski Camo bəy Hacınski
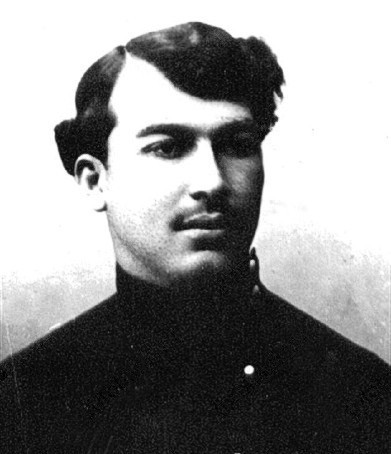

Minister of Postal Service and Telegraph of Azerbaijan Democratic Republic (ADR)
- In office December 24, 1919 – April 1, 1920
- President: Nasib bey Yusifbeyli Prime Minister, (Chairman of Azerbaijani Parliament)
- Preceded by: Jamo bey Hajinski
- Succeeded by: office terminated
- In office April 14, 1919 – December 22, 1919
- Preceded by: Aslan bey Safikurdski
- Succeeded by: Jamo bey Hajinski

State Controller of Azerbaijan Democratic Republic (ADR)
- In office May 28, 1918 – March 14, 1919
- President: Fatali Khan Khoyski Prime Minister, (Chairman of Azerbaijani Parliament)
- Preceded by: office established
- Succeeded by: Abdulali bey Amirjanov

Personal details
- Born: 1888 Quba, Baku Governorate
- Died: 1942 (aged 53–54) Vyatka, Kirov Oblast

Jamo bey Hajinski Suleyman oghlu (Azerbaijani: Camo bəy Hacınski Süleyman oğlu; 1888 – 1942) was an Azerbaijani cultural figure and politician. He served in the first, fourth and fifth cabinets of Azerbaijan Democratic Republic as its State Controller and Minister of Postal Service and Telegraph.

== Early life and career ==
Hajinski was born in Quba on June 14, 1888, the son of Camo Bey Süleyman Bey and the younger brother of social and political figure Mehdi Bey Hajinski. He moved to Baku at a young age and studied at the gymnasium here. After graduating, in 1907 he started working as a reporter in the "Kaspi" newspaper published in Russian in Baku; he continued his cooperation with this newspaper until 1915.

In 1912, he graduated from Law Department of Petersburg University, followed by a degree in Economics in 1914. Upon his return to Azerbaijan in 1915, he worked as a trustee of the Muslim Refugee Committee, which was established to provide assistance to the victims of the First World War in the Seaside district of Batumi province. He was also involved in the work of "Nicat" Cultural and Educational Society and was one of the founders of the Muslim Drama Society in 1916 and the Azerbaijan Archaeological Society in 1917.

Hajinski was appointed the lawyer of the Transcaucasia Committee of the Provisional Government of Russia in April 1917, and worked in this position until July of the same year. In July, he was elected the deputy chairman of the Executive Committee of the Transcaucasia Peasant Deputies and was sent as a representative to the Transcaucasia Central Commission.

In 1918, Hajinski gave lectures on Azerbaijani art at the "Turkish Homeland" Society, and published articles under the signature "gubali" in the press of the time. He wrote articles and reviews about the performances of Uzeyir Hajibeyov's works, as well as the works of Najaf bey Vazirov and others. In 1919-1920, he published a book of poems called "National Songs".

Hajinski's affiliation was with Muslim Socialist Bloc. Hajinski was elected a member of the "Muslim faction" of the Transcaucasian Sejm in February 1918. He was a member of the "Bloc of Muslim Socialists" approved by the Sejm on February 28 of that year.

== Activities during the Azerbaijan Democratic Republic ==
After the Sejm was dissolved on May 26, 1918, he was elected to the Presidium of Azerbaijani National Council, an Azerbaijani governing body which would establish sovereignty in Azerbaijan and which was established on May 27, 1918. Along with his relative Mammad Hasan Hajinski, he was one of the 26 deputies who voted for the Declaration of Independence adopted by the Azerbaijani National Council on May 28, 1918.

Hajinski served as the State Controller in Fatali Khan Khoyski's newly formed first government. On June 17 of the same year, when the first government cabinet of Fatali Khan Khoyski resigned, Hajinski also left his post.

On December 7, 1918, the Parliament of the Azerbaijan Democratic Republic was inaugurated in Baku. At that time, Hajinski was included in the Parliament according to the "Law on the establishment of the Azerbaijan Majlis-Mabusana" dated November 19, 1918 of the Azerbaijan National Council. Hajinski was represented in the 4th "Socialist faction" of the Parliament. Hajinski's name was listed sixth among thirteen people in the reading presented to the Parliament.

Hajinski was a member of the Material-Supplies Commission in the Parliament. As a rule, he showed himself as an active and proactive deputy in the discussions of the bills presented from the very first sessions of the Parliament. For example, at the second session of the Parliament in 1918, he proposed that Deputies who do not come to the parliamentary session should not be paid that day's salary.

On March 14, 1919, the Fourth government cabinet of the Republic of Azerbaijan was formed. Camo bey Hajinski, a member of the "Socialist faction" in the Parliament, was appointed to the position of Minister of Transportation, Postal Service and Telegraph in Nasib Yusifbeyli's fourth and fifth governments. He also held this position during the Fifth government cabinet of Nasib Bey Yusifbeyli and worked in this position until April 9, 1920.

In April 1920, during the government crisis, after the resignation of Nasib Bey Yusifbeyli's Fifth cabinet, the Parliament entrusted Muhammad Hasan Hajinski to form the new government. At that time, the "Socialist faction" nominated Hajinski for the post of Minister of Internal Affairs in the newly formed government.

== The period of imprisonment ==
After the Bolshevik invasion of Azerbaijan on April 28, 1920, Hajinski was appointed the head of the Administrative-Financial Department at the People's Commissariat of Justice of the Azerbaijan SSR, as the Soviet authorities had a particularly great need for personnel like Hajinski at first. While working in this position, Hajinski continued his activities in the field of culture and education. He was closely involved in the work of the Azerbaijan Application and Education Society and was also involved in the protection of Azerbaijan's ancient cultural monuments.

Hajinski was arrested as part of a group of "eser" (socialists) on April 7, 1922, as a result of a special operation conducted by the Azerbaijan Cheka. On December 10, 1922, Hajinski and his colleague Aslan bey Safikurdski were sentenced to three years in prison. After three years of painful prison life in Moscow's Butyrka prison and the Chelyabinsk prison camp, he was sent to the Solovki prison camp (founded in 1919, considered one of the world's first concentration camps) located on the White Sea in the Arkhangelsk region in the north of the USSR. He was released in 1928.

== Later years and death ==
Hajinski returned to Baku after his release, and from July of the same year, he became the secretary and then the head of the Planning Department in the Azerbaijan Agricultural Cooperative Union ("Goybirliyi"). Hajinski was later appointed to the position of chief adviser at the Industrial Cooperative, where he worked until January 7, 1937.

Hajinski was arrested anew in 1937. He was accused of being a member of a secret organization created in Azerbaijan by Osintsev, an activist who came from Moscow. On November 24, 1938, Hajinski was deported to Vyatka prison camp in Kirov Oblast of Russia where he died in 1942.

Fourteen years after his death, he was declared not guilty of any crime by decision No. 1878 dated June 26, 1956 of the Military Collegium of the Supreme Court of the USSR. His son was presented with a certificate of his exoneration.

== See also ==
- Azerbaijani National Council
