= Khalil bey Khasmammadov =

Azerbaijani politician and diplomat (1873-1945)

Khalil bey Khasmammadov Xəlil bəy Xasməmmədov
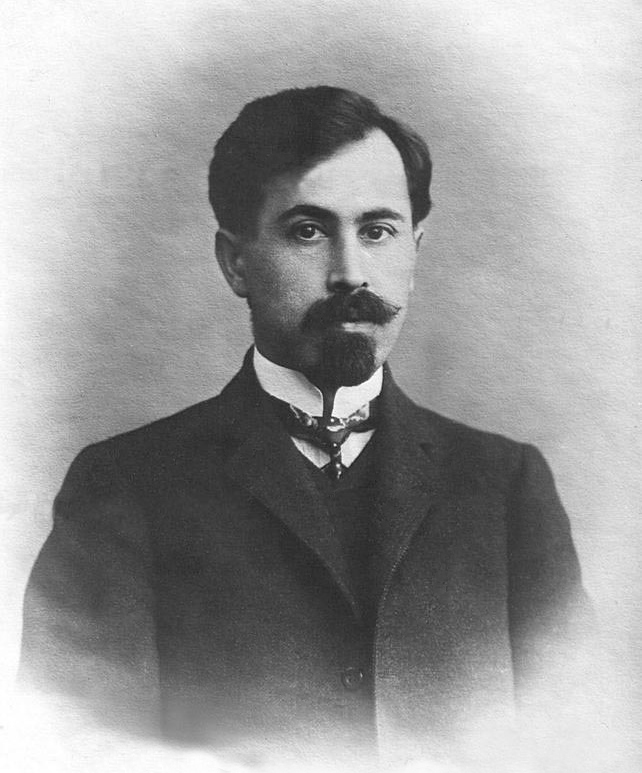

Minister of Internal Affairs of Azerbaijan Democratic Republic (ADR)
- In office December 26, 1918 – June 16, 1919
- President: Fatali Khan Khoyski (Chairman of Parliament of the Azerbaijan Democratic Republic)
- Preceded by: Behbud Khan Javanshir
- Succeeded by: Nasib Yusifbeyli

Minister of Justice of Azerbaijan Democratic Republic (ADR)
- In office December 24, 1919 – April 1, 1920
- Preceded by: Aslan bey Safikurdski
- Succeeded by: office terminated
- In office May 28, 1918 – June 17, 1918
- Preceded by: office established
- Succeeded by: Aslan bey Safikurdski

Personal details
- Born: 1873 Ganja, Elisabethpol Governorate
- Died: 1945 (aged 71–72) Istanbul, Turkey

Khalil bey Hajibaba oghlu Khasmammadov (Azerbaijani: خلیل بگ حاجی بابا اوغلی خاص محمدوف, Xəlil bəy Hacıbaba oğlu Xasməmmədov; 1873–1945) was an Azerbaijani public figure, politician and diplomat. He served as a Member of the First and Second State Duma of the Russian Empire, Minister of Internal Affairs and Minister of Justice of Azerbaijan Democratic Republic, and as the last Ambassador of Azerbaijan to Ottoman Turkey.

== Early life ==
Khasmammadov was born to a family of lawyers in Elisavetpol (Ganja) in 1873 (on his grave: 1870). He had four brothers. Khasmammadov graduated from Moscow State University with a degree in Law. Ismail Bey Gaspirali played a significant role in shaping his thoughts. His political activity started during the university years when he was a member of Muslim-Caucasus Fellow Countrymen Society. He then worked as an attorney in Yekaterinodar and Ganja district courts.

== Political career ==
In the fall of 1905, together with his brother Alakbar, Khasmammadov participated in the establishment of Difai (Defense), a clandestine political association in Ganja. The group, which also included intellectuals such as Nasib Yusifbeyli, Ismayil Ziyadkhanov, and Ahmed Bey Aghayev, sought to counter the activity of Armenian Revolutionary Federation.

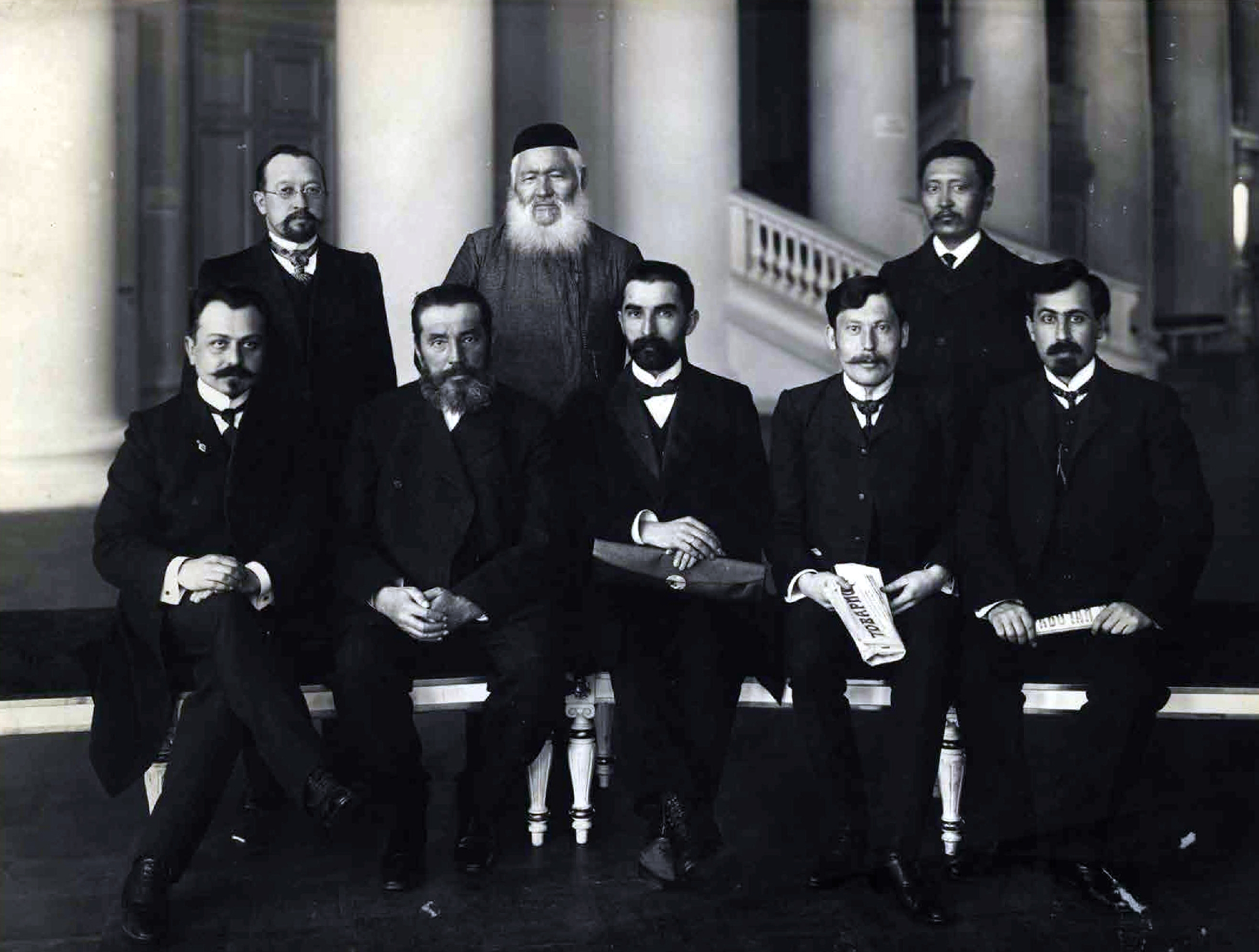
Khalil Bey Khasmamedov (seated right) with a group of deputies of the II State Duma Muslims. 1907

Khasmammadov was a member of the first and second Russian Duma. Along with five other Azerbaijani deputies, in November 1911, he spoke in the Duma against a discriminatory practice of exempting Azeris and other Caucasian Muslims from military service in Russian Imperial forces, while levying them with a special tax. As a member of Musavat Party, he was also closely involved with Azerbaijani national movement for autonomy within Russian Empire.

Khasmammadov has also been active during establishment of Azerbaijan Democratic Republic in 1918. He was a member of Azerbaijani National Council and one of the co-signers of declaration of independence of Azerbaijan Democratic Republic in Tiflis on May 28, 1918.

During the ADR period, Khasmammadov held ministerial posts in four of the five cabinets of Azerbaijani government. Khasmammadov served as the first Minister of Justice from May 28, 1918 until June 17, 1918; Minister of Internal Affairs from December 26, 1918 through June 16, 1919; and again Minister of Justice from December 24, 1919 until April 1, 1920, the end of 5th cabinet. He secured the cooperation of Defense, National Security and Internal Affairs ministries to face of external challenges against statehood.

In the beginning of April 1920, Khasmammadov was appointed ADR's ambassador to Turkey, and upon his arrival to Istanbul, ADR government fell to Bolsheviks. He stayed in Turkey for the rest of his life and died in 1945. He was buried in Feriköy cemetery.

== See also ==
- Azerbaijani National Council
