= Akbar agha Sheykhulislamov =

Azerbaijani public figure and politician

Akbar agha Sheykhulislamov Əkbər ağa Şeyxülislamov
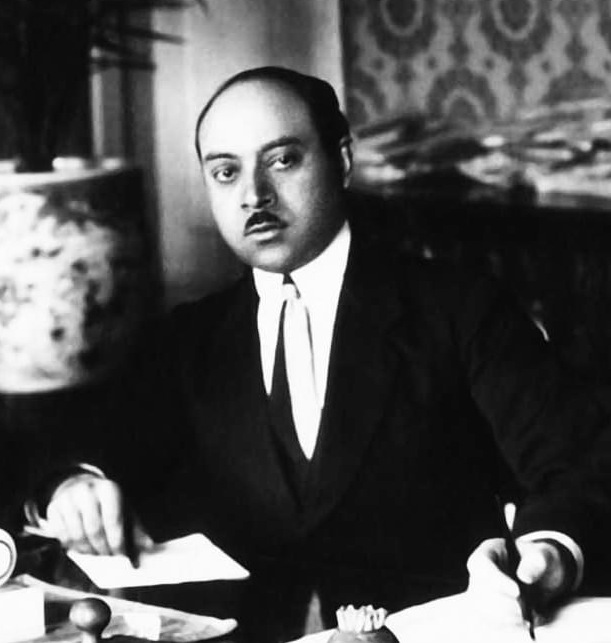

Minister of Agriculture and Labor of Azerbaijan Democratic Republic (ADR)
- In office May 28, 1918 – June 17, 1918
- President: Fatali Khan Khoyski Prime Minister, (Chairman of Azerbaijani Parliament)
- Preceded by: office established

Personal details
- Born: 1891 Yerevan, Erivan Governorate
- Died: 1961 (aged 69–70) Paris, France
- Resting place: Bobigny cemetery

Akbar agha Sheykhulislamov (Azerbaijani: Əkbər ağa Şeyxülislamov; 1891 – 1961) was an Azerbaijani public figure and politician. He served in the First cabinet of Azerbaijan Democratic Republic as its Minister of Agriculture and Labor.

== Early life and career ==
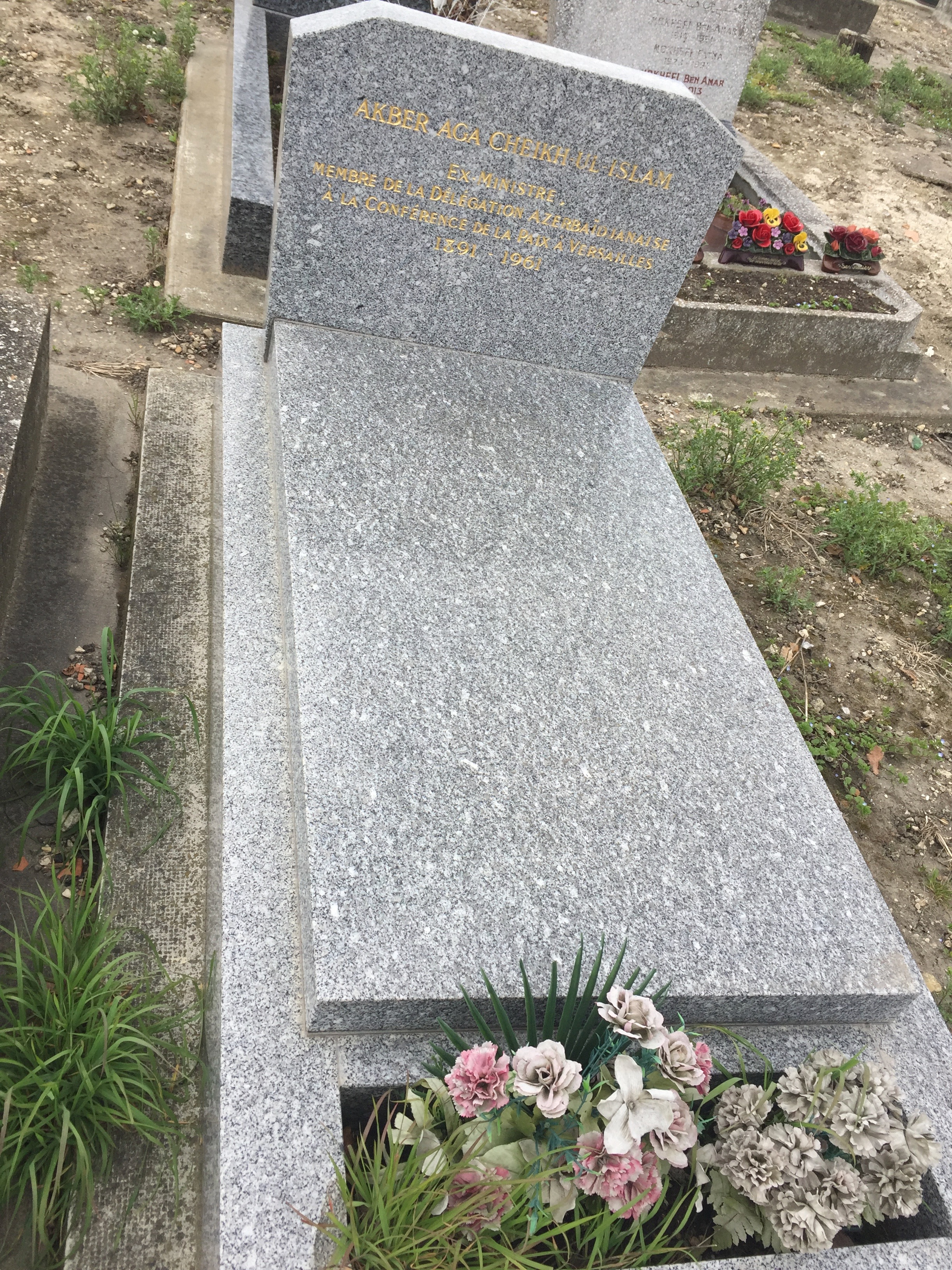
Tomb of Sheykhulislamov in Bobigny Islamic cemetery.

Sheykhulislamov was born in Yerevan in 1891. Having graduated from a gymnasium in Erivan, he got enrolled Petersburg State Transport University in 1912. Upon his return to Azerbaijan, he worked as the Deputy Minister of Internal Affairs of Transcaucasian Democratic Federative Republic. Sheykhulislamov was a member of Hummet party. He was one of the co-signers of Proclamation of Independence of Azerbaijan Democratic Republic.

After establishment of Azerbaijan Democratic Republic on May 28, 1918, he was appointed Minister of Agriculture and Labor in Fatali Khan Khoyski's newly formed government and served in the National Assembly of Azerbaijan until the Bolshevik invasion of Azerbaijan on April 28, 1920, when he fled the country.

Sheykhulislamov died on March 2, 1961, in Paris, France and was buried in Bobigny Islamic cemetery (near Paris).

== See also ==
- Azerbaijani National Council
