= Səfikürd, Goygol =

Səfikürd
- Location within Azerbaijan
- Coordinates: 40°33′31″N 46°16′37″E
- Country: Azerbaijan
- Rayon: Goygol
- Time zone: UTC+4 (AZT)
  - Summer (DST): UTC+5 (AZT)

Səfikürd is a village in the Goygol Rayon of Azerbaijan.
