= Ahrar Party (Azerbaijan) =

Political party in Azerbaijan

The Ahrar Party (Azerbaijani: Əhrar firqəsi; "Liberal Party") was a small political party in the Azerbaijan Democratic Republic (1918–1920). It had five members in the Azerbaijani Parliament of 1918, and one minister in the fourth cabinet. It was dissolved after Soviet invasion of Azerbaijan in 1920.

== Members of Parliament ==
- Aslan bey Gardashov
- Haji Molla Ahmad Nuruzadeh
- Mukhtar Afandizadeh
- Garib Karimoglu
- Bayram Niyazi Kichikkhanly

== Minister ==
- Aslan bey Gardashov, Minister of Agriculture

== See also ==
- Azerbaijan Democratic Republic
- Musavat
- Ittihad
