= Səfikürd, Goranboy =

Səfikürd
- Municipality
- Location within Azerbaijan
- Coordinates: 40°32′42″N 46°46′24″E
- Country: Azerbaijan
- Rayon: Goranboy

Population
  - Total: 3,998
- Time zone: UTC+4 (AZT)
  - Summer (DST): UTC+5 (AZT)

Səfikürd (also, Safikyurd and Safykyurd) is a village and municipality in the Goranboy Rayon of Azerbaijan. It has a population of 3,998.
