= Mammad Hasan Hajinski =

Azerbaijani architect and statesman

- Məmməd Həsən Hacınski
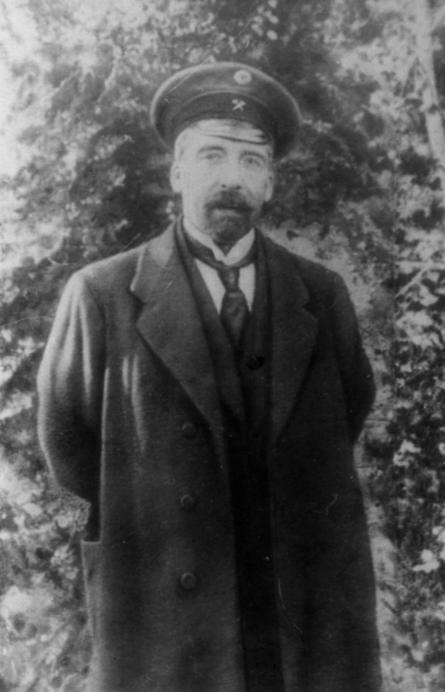

Minister of Foreign Affairs of Azerbaijan Democratic Republic (ADR)
- In office May 28, 1918 – October 6, 1918
- President: Fatali Khan Khoyski (Chairman of Azerbaijani Parliament)
- Preceded by: office created
- Succeeded by: Alimardan Topchubashov

Minister of Finance of ADR
- In office October 6, 1918 – December, 1918
- Preceded by: Abdulali bey Amirjanov
- Succeeded by: Ivan Protasov

Minister of Internal Affairs of ADR
- In office December 22, 1919 – February 15, 1920
- President: Nasib bey Yusifbeyli
- Preceded by: Nasib bey Yusifbeyli (Chairman of Azerbaijani Parliament)
- Succeeded by: Mustafa Vakilov

Personal details
- Born: March 3, 1875 Baku, Baku Governorate, Caucasus Viceroyalty, Russian Empire
- Died: February 9, 1931 (aged 55) Tiflis, Georgian SSR, Soviet Union
- Occupation: Architect, politician

Mammad Hasan Jafargulu oglu Hajinski (Azerbaijani: Məmməd Həsən Cəfərqulu oğlu Hacınski; March 3, 1875 – February 9, 1931) was an Azerbaijani architect and statesman. He also served as a Minister for Foreign Affairs of Azerbaijan Democratic Republic (ADR) and the last Prime Minister of ADR.

== Early life ==
Hajinski was born on March 3, 1875, in Baku. He graduated from Baku Realny School and then Petersburg Technical School in 1902 with an engineering degree. He worked at the construction of a Russian oil refinery being built by Azerbaijani businessman Shamsi Asadullayev before he moved back to Azerbaijan and was appointed the director of the construction department of Baku municipality. During the time he held this position, he made significant contributions to architectural improvements of Baku. Under his management, construction of Baku Seaside Boulevard gained a new impetus in 1910, when at his insistence, the Municipal Parliament passed a bill allocating 60,000 rubles for improvements. One of the notable designers employed by Hajinski was Adolph Eykler, the German architect who designed Baku's German Lutheran Church. The project was successfully completed in 1911. In 1913, he headed the municipality for a brief period of time.

== Political career ==
Having secretly joined Musavat party in 1911, Hajinski started his open political activities after Russia's February Revolution of 1917. He also actively participated in establishment and operations of the Hummet newspaper. On March 22, 1917 Interim Executive Committee of Muslim Council was established and Hajinski was appointed its chairman. He participated in the Baku summit of Caucasian Muslims and later in Moscow summit of Russian Muslims in May of the same year. He was subsequently elected a deputy to the Russian parliament from Azerbaijan. On November 15, 1917, he was appointed deputy Commissar of Industry and Trade (Mammad Yusif Jafarov) of Transcaucasian Commissariat and from April 22, 1918, he served as the Minister of Industry and Trade of Transcaucasian Democratic Federative Republic.

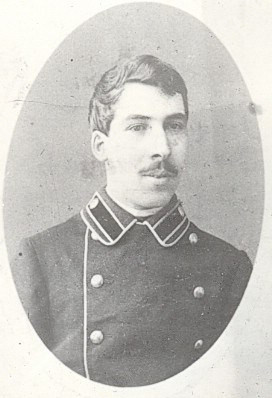
Mammad Hasan Hajinski as a student

=== Azerbaijan Democratic Republic ===
On May 28, 1918, when Azerbaijan Democratic Republic (ADR) was proclaimed, Hajinski was appointed the Minister of Foreign Affairs within the new Cabinet of Azerbaijan established by Prime Minister Fatali Khan Khoyski and held the office until October 6, 1918. When the second government of ADR was formed, he was appointed the Minister of Internal Affairs of Azerbaijan and worked in the position until February 15, 1920. As the Foreign Minister, on June 4, 1918, Hajinski along with Mammed Amin Rasulzade signed a contract with the Turkish government on the provision of military assistance to Azerbaijan. On April 1, 1920, Hajinski was put in charge of forming the new cabinet of ADR. Intending to establish a coalition government he held negotiations with all fractions in the Azerbaijani Parliament including the Bolsheviks. By inviting the Bolsheviks to the new government, Hajinski hoped to slow down the advance of 11th Red Army which was already near the Samur bridge, on the Azerbaijani-Russian border and have the detachments of Azerbaijani Army relocate to Baku. Most of the Azerbaijani army units were on the frontline in Mountainous Karabakh fighting the Dashnak uprising. On April 22, Bolsheviks rejected Hajinski's offer and he notified the acting speaker of the National Assembly, Mammad Yusif Jafarov that the government was in no position to be formed. At the same time, Hajinski left the ranks of Musavat party and officially joined the Bolshevik Party. With the invasion of the Red Army on April 28, 1920 Azerbaijan Democratic Republic ceased to exist.

=== Soviet Azerbaijan ===
During Soviet rule, Hajinski worked in the Agricultural Council of Azerbaijan. From 1923 on, he served as deputy chairman of the Transcaucasian State Planning Committee. He was later arrested on the order of Lavrentiy Beria, then the first secretary of the Transcaucasian region. After being tortured, Hajinski died on February 9, 1931, in a Tiflis prison.

== Works ==
In 1912, Hajinski authored a book on architectural improvements of Baku published by the Baku local municipality.

== See also ==
- Minister of Foreign Affairs of Azerbaijan
- Azerbaijan Democratic Republic
- Azerbaijani National Council
