= Nasib bey Yusifbeyli =

Azerbaijani politician

- Nəsib bəy Yusifbəyli
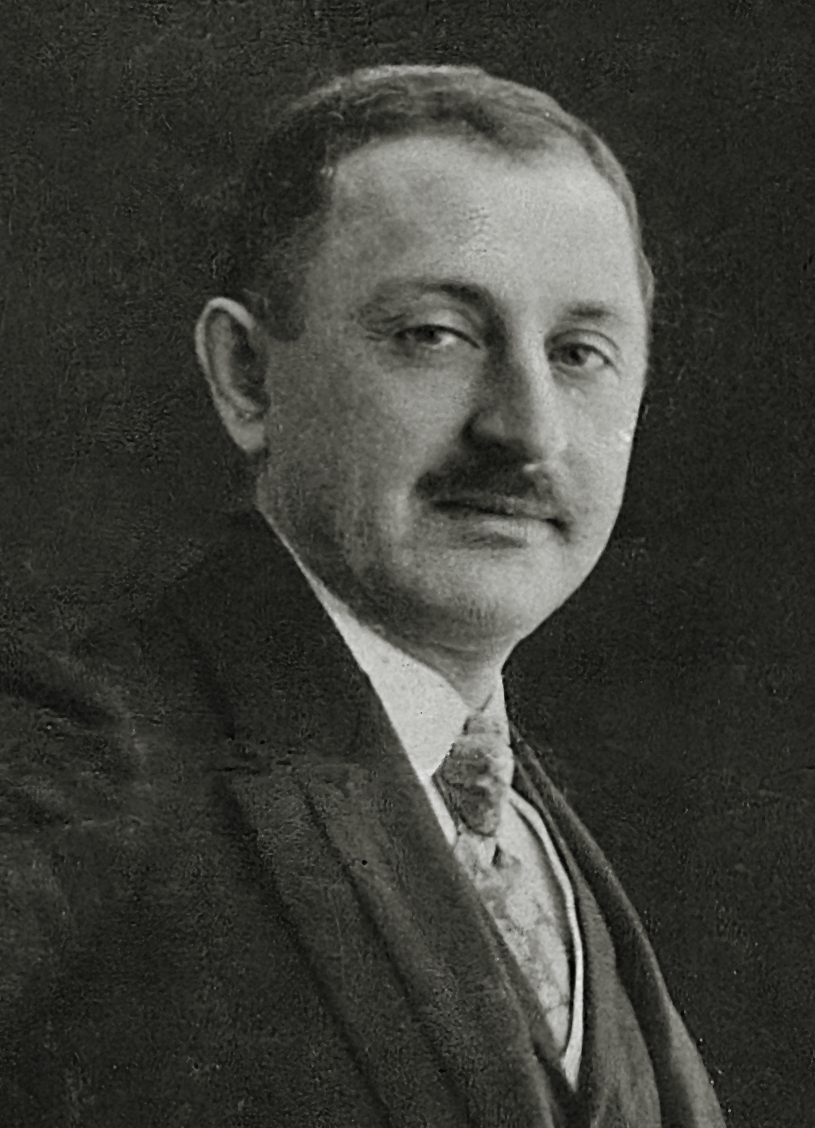
- Yusifbeyli in 1910

Minister of Finance of ADR
- In office 28 May 1918 – June 1918
- President: Alimardan bey Topchubashov (Chairman of Azerbaijani Parliament)
- Preceded by: office established
- Succeeded by: Abdulali bey Amirjanov

Chairman of the Council of Ministers of the Azerbaijan Democratic Republic
- In office 14 April 1919 – 1 April 1920
- Preceded by: Fatali Khan Khoyski
- Succeeded by: Mammad Hasan Hajinski (acting)

Personal details
- Born: 5 July 1881 Ganja, Elisabethpol Governorate, Russian Empire
- Died: 31 May 1920 (aged 38) Outside of Baku
- Party: Musavat
- Spouse: Şefiqa Gaspıralı
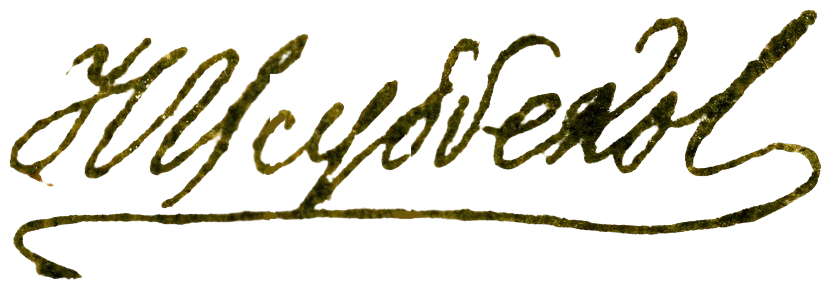
- Signature

Nasib bey Yusif bey oghlu Yusifbeyli (Azerbaijani: Nəsib bəy Yusif bəy oğlu Yusifbəyli) or Usubbeyov (Azerbaijani: Usubbəyov; 5 July 1881 – 31 May 1920) was an Azerbaijani publicist, statesman and major political figure in the Azerbaijan Democratic Republic.

== Early years ==
Nasib bey Yusifbeyli was born in 1881 in Elisavetpol (present-day Ganja, Azerbaijan). After graduating from a gymnasium (secondary school) in Ganja, he enrolled as a student at the Law Faculty of the Novorossiya University (now the Odesa University) in 1902. When the university was temporarily shut down by the Tsarist Russian authorities due to revolutionary student activities, N. Yusifbeyli moved to Bakhchisarai in Crimea. In 1907, Yusifbeyli began working for Terciman, the newspaper founded by prominent thinker Ismail Bey Gaspirali. While in Crimea, he married Gaspirali’s daughter, Shafiga Gaspirali. A year later, in 1908, he moved to Turkey, continuing on his work as a publicist and establishing the Turkic Society. He returned to Ganja in 1909.

== Political Activities ==
After returning to Ganja, Nasib bey Yusifbeyli joined the Difai organization, which had been established in 1905 to protect the Azerbaijani Turkish community from Armenian attacks supported by the Russian authorities. In Ganja, a National Committee was established to oversee all efforts—both open and covert—against Russian rule. The Executive Committee was chaired by Nasib Yusufbeyli, who was also responsible for secret activities.

In 1917, Yusifbeyli established the National Party of Turkic Federalists (Turk Adam-i Markaziyyat Firqasi) in Ganja, with the main goal of federalism in the Russian empire. The immediate predecessor of the Adam-i Markaziyyat party was the Difai organization. Also known as the Federalists, the Adam-i Markaziyyat gained significant support, particularly among the rural and small-town communities of the Ganja region. Although its leadership included some prominent local landowners, this did not diminish the movement’s popularity. On the contrary, the Federalists attracted attention largely due to their strong promotion of Turkist ideas.

Between April 15 and 20, 1917, the First Congress of Caucasian Muslims was held in Baku. Leaders mainly from the Musavat Party, based in Baku, and the Federalist Party, centered in Ganja, attended the congress. During the meeting, both the Federalist Party and the Musavat Party agreed that Russia should have a federal system based on democratic representation and land distribution. Later, at the All-Russian Muslim Congress, Nasip Bey Yusufbeyli, representing the Federalist Party, received support for the idea of federalism in Russia from Mehmet Amin Rasulzada. Thus, the congress in April 1917 laid the foundation for the union of the Musavat and Federalist parties based on shared principles. Although the parties had disagreements over land reform, they soon officially merged, forming the Turkic Party of Federalists-Musavat. Over time, this party became known simply as Musavat.

After the merge, Yusifbeyli was nominated as a member of the Constituent Assembly of Russia, where he was elected from the Transcaucasian electoral district according to list No. 10 - the Muslim National Committee and Musavat.

The dispersal of the Constituent Assembly by the Bolsheviks put an end to doubts about the possibility of establishing a parliamentary system in Russia under the Bolshevik government. This forced deputies from the South Caucasus to declare the non-recognition of the power of the Bolsheviks and the creation of their own regional power - the Transcaucasian Seim. The seats in this regional parliament were distributed among national parties. The second-largest faction in the Sejm was the Musavat Party faction. The head of the faction was M.E. Rasulzade and N. Yusifbeyli became one of his two deputies.

During the period of the Seim Government, Nasib Yusifbeyli was one of the members of the delegation sent to Batumi to inform representatives about the general situation in Azerbaijan and to Istanbul to officially request assistance from Turkey.

On May 27, 1918, at the meeting of former members of the Muslims of the Transcaucasian Seim, the National Council of Azerbaijan was established, which included Nasib Yusifbeyli. May 28, 1918, the first Azerbaijani government was created. Yusifbeyli appointed to the posts of Minister of Finance, Minister of Public Education and Religious Affairs.

On June 17, during a meeting of the National Council, Nasib Bey Yusifbeyli expressed his views on the ongoing crisis in the country:

The new government will rule the country and convene the Constituent Assembly in the nearest future. It will not voluntarily surrender this right to anyone, preserves it as the most valuable thing and only surrenders it in the face of power and the sword. I must declare that I will be the first one to rise against the aggressor who would ever try to interfere with our freedom.

After the Bolshevik invasion of Azerbaijan and fall of ADR in April 1920, N. Yusifbeyli escaped from Baku but was murdered on 31 May 1920.

== Relations ==
During the period of the Seim Government, Nasib Yusifbeyli was one of the members of the delegation sent to Batumi to inform representatives about the general situation in Azerbaijan and to Istanbul to officially request assistance from Turkey.

One day before Major General W. M. Thomson, who had been assigned to take control of Baku, arrived in the city on 17 November with a military unit of 2,000 soldiers, he held a meeting in Enzeli with a delegation consisting of Nasib Yusifbeyli, Ali Akbar Rafibeyli, and Ahmad Aghayev, representing the Musavat Government, in order to learn about his intentions regarding Baku.

When he was the head of government, relations with Georgia were established as a result of the conclusion of a military agreement. When Yusifbeyli was a prime minister, relations were established with many European states. In January 1920, the Supreme Council of the Entente recognized the independence of Azerbaijan de facto.

Oliver Wardrop, who was appointed by Britain as the High Commissioner to the Caucasus in the autumn of 1919, provided this information about Nasib Bey in a report he sent to London after his visit to Baku on October 2:

Sir Yusifbeyli is a broad-minded person, highly educated, witty, dedicated to liberal ideas, outspoken, humble, a very goal-oriented and courteous person … The ideas of the prime minister are not religious ones, but are of a national character. He hates Bolshevism. If there is something that he is genuinely interested in, it is the independence of his country. His team and cabinet can serve as a role model for some European countries …They manage their affairs very well and as worthy persons, they first of all strive to occupy their proper place in the new world.

Mehmet Amin Rasulzada said the following about Nasib Bey Yusifbeyli’s role in the history of the Azerbaijan: “The honor of formulating the idea of Azerbaijan as a political entity belongs to the late Nasib Bey.”
