= Azerbaijan Democratic Republic =

1918–1920 state in the South Caucasus

Coordinates: 40.50°N 47.56°E

Republic of Azerbaijan آذربایجان جمهوریّتی Azərbaycan Cümhuriyyəti
- 1918–1920
- Left: Flag (1918); Right: Flag (1918-1920)

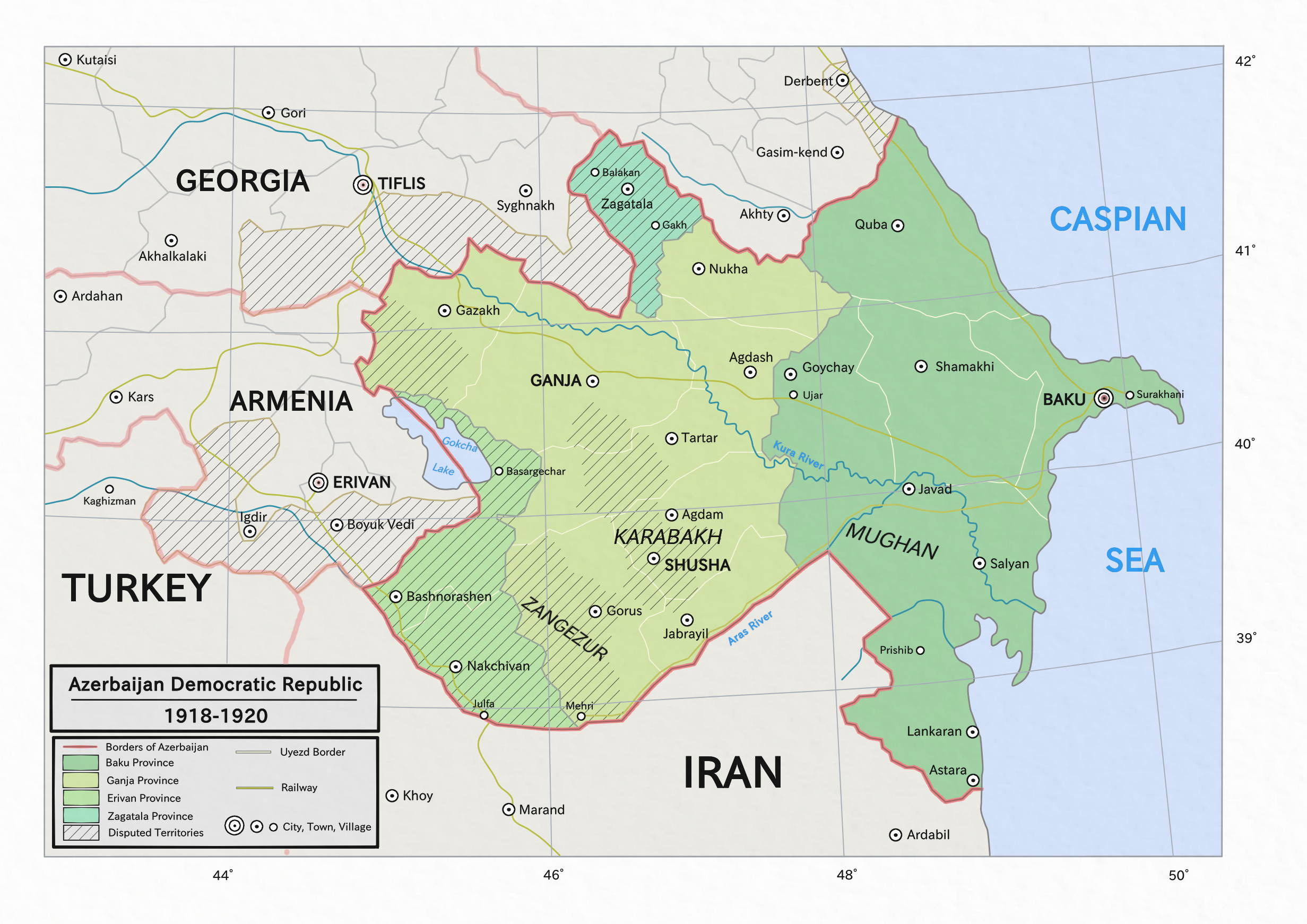
- Map of the Azerbaijan Democratic Republic with territorial claims and disputed areas
- Capital: Ganja (until September 1918); Baku
- Common languages: Azerbaijani (Note: Contemporarily called Turkic.)
- Demonym: Azerbaijani
- Government: Parliamentary republic
- Prime Minister
  - 1918–1919: Fatali Khan Khoyski
  - 1919–1920: Nasib bey Yusifbeyli
  - 1920: Mammad Hasan Hajinski
- Speaker
  - 1918: Mammad Amin Rasulzade
  - 1918–1920: Alimardan bey Topchubashov
- Legislature: Azerbaijani National Council (Succeeded by) Parliament of the Azerbaijan Democratic Republic
- Historical era: Interwar period
  - Independence declared: 28 May 1918
  - Soviet invasion: 28 April 1920
  - Azerbaijani independence restored: 18 October 1991

Area
- 1918: 99,908.87 km^{2} (38,575.03 sq mi)

Population
  - 1919 estimate: 4,617,671
- GDP (nominal): 1919 estimate
  - Total: 665 million
- Currency: Azerbaijani ruble
Preceded by	Succeeded by
Transcaucasian Democratic Federative Republic	Azerbaijan Soviet Socialist Republic
- Today part of: Armenia; Azerbaijan; Georgia

The Republic of Azerbaijan, (Note: Other names include: Azerbaijan (Azərbaycan); Caucasian Azerbaijan; Tatar Republic of Azerbaijan; Azerbaijan Democratic Republic (Azərbaycan Demokratik Cümhuriyyəti; Azərbaycan Demokratik Respublikası; ADC, ADR); Azerbaijan People's Republic (Azərbaycan Xalq Cümhuriyyəti)) better known in historiography as the Azerbaijan Democratic Republic, was the first secular democratic republic in the Turkic and Muslim worlds. The ADR was founded by the Azerbaijani National Council in Tiflis on 28 May 1918 after the collapse of the Transcaucasian Democratic Federative Republic, and ceased to exist on 28 April 1920. Its established borders were with Russia to the north, the Democratic Republic of Georgia to the north-west, the Republic of Armenia to the west, and Iran to the south. It had a population of around 3 million. Ganja was the temporary capital of the Republic as Baku was under Bolshevik control.

Under the ADR, a government system was developed in which a Parliament elected on the basis of universal, free, and proportionate representation was the supreme organ of state authority; the Council of Ministers was held responsible before it. Fatali Khan Khoyski became its first prime minister. Besides the Musavat majority, Ahrar, Ittihad, Muslim Social Democrats as well as representatives of Armenian (21 out of 120 seats), Russian, Polish, German, and Jewish minorities gained seats in the parliament. Many members supported Pan-Islamist and Pan-Turkist ideas.

Among the important accomplishments of the Parliament was the extension of suffrage to women, making Azerbaijan one of the first countries in the world, and the first majority-Muslim nation, to grant women equal political rights with men. Another important accomplishment of the ADR was the establishment of Baku State University, which was the first modern-type university founded in Azerbaijan.

== Name ==
The name of "Azerbaijan" which the leading Musavat party adopted, for political reasons, was, prior to the establishment of the Azerbaijan Democratic Republic in 1918, exclusively used to identify the adjacent region of contemporary northwestern Iran. The toponym "Azerbaijan" has been the object of a naming controversy since 1918 between the region of Azerbaijan in Iran and the Republic of Azerbaijan in the South Caucasus. The toponym historically belongs to the former, i.e. the region of Azerbaijan in northwestern Iran, south of the Aras River, while historians and geographers usually referred to the region north of the Aras River as Arran, even though the name "Azerbaijan" had also sometimes been extended to this area as well. On May 28, 1918, following the collapse of the Russian Empire, the Azerbaijan Democratic Republic was proclaimed to the north of the Aras, triggering the controversy.

== Establishment ==
From 1813 to 1828, as a result of Qajar Iran's forced cession through the Treaty of Gulistan (1813) and the Treaty of Turkmenchay (1828), the territory of modern-day Azerbaijan, and in turn what was the short-lived ADR, had become part of the Russian Empire. By 1917, when both Russian revolutions took place the territory, Azerbaijan had been part of the empire's Caucasus Viceroyalty for more than 100 years, alongside the rest of the Transcaucasus, ever since Iran's cession. After the February Revolution, the Special Transcaucasian Committee was established to fill the administrative gap following the abdication of the Tsar. The members of the committee were the members of the State Council and representatives of the Armenian, Georgian and Azerbaijan political elite. The committee announced that in the following months the most important issues were to be solved by the Transcaucasian Constituent Assembly.

In the course of April and May 1917, several Muslim Assemblies took place. Like many ethnic minorities of Transcaucasia, Azeris aimed at secession from Russia after the February Revolution. Two general opinions were expressed by the representatives of the Muslim community (Mammad Hasan Hajinski, Mammad Amin Rasulzade, Alimardan Topchubashov, Fatali Khan Khoyski, and other founders of the future Azerbaijan Democratic Republic): pan-Turkish, meaning joining with Turkey, and federalization (expressed by M. Rasulzade). The Transcaucasian region decided on federalization. In accordance with the new structure, the Transcaucasian region was to have a fully independent internal policy, leaving only foreign policy, defense, and custom to the new Russian government.

After the October revolution of 1917, the Transcaucasian government had to change its policy as Russia was now involved in the Civil War. The Transcaucasians did not accept the Bolshevik revolution. In February 1918, the Transcaucasian Seim started its work in Tbilisi, and this was the first serious step towards complete independence of the Caucasian nations. The "Seim" consisted of 125 deputies and represented 3 leading parties: Georgian mensheviks (32 deputies), Azerbaijan Muslims ("Mussavat", 30 deputies), and Armenian "dashnaks" (27 deputies). Bolsheviks refused to join the Seim and established their own government of the local Soviet in Baku: the so-called Baku Commune (November 1917 – 31 July 1918). The Commune was formed by 85 Social Revolutionaries and Left Social Revolutionaries, 48 Bolsheviks, 36 Dashnaks, 18 Musavatists and 13 Mensheviks. Stepan Shaumyan, a Bolshevik, and Prokopius Dzhaparidze, a leftist SR, were elected Chairmen of the Council of People's Commissioners of the Commune of Baku.

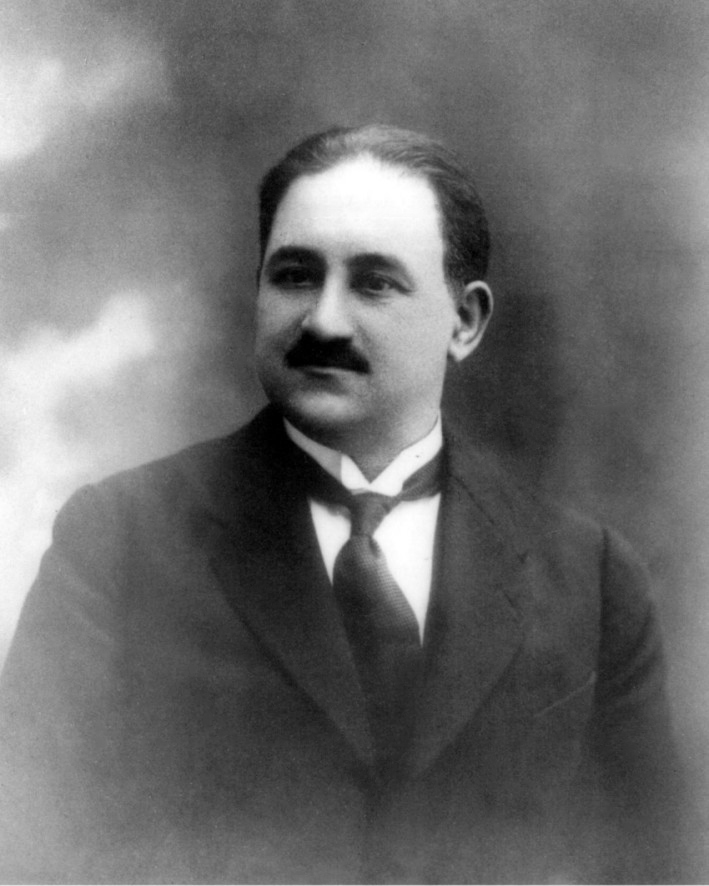
A founder and Speaker of the Republic, Mammad Amin Rasulzade is widely regarded as the national leader of Azerbaijan.

The Russian Caucasus Army was degrading after the collapse of the Russian Empire. The Russian forces were substituted by new Armenian bodies, which were not prepared for the war. Given the circumstances, the Transcaucasian Seim signed the Armistice of Erzincan with the Ottoman Empire on 5 December 1917. On 3 March 1918, the Bolshevik government in Russia signed the Brest-Litovsk Treaty with Germany. One of the terms was the loss of the regions of Kars, Batumi, and Ardahan to the Ottoman Empire. The terms of the Treaty revealed a deep conflict between Georgians and Armenians on one side and the Muslims on another. The peace talks between the Seim and Turkey started in March 1918, in Trapezond did not have any results. The Ottoman Empire delivered an ultimatum to the Seim with requirements to accept the terms of the Brest-Litovsk Treaty and initiated an attack to occupy the territories of Kars, Batumi, and Ardahan.

First flag of the Azerbaijan Democratic Republic adopted on 21 June 1918, with reference number 144 (until 9 November 1918)

In March 1918, ethnic and religious tension grew and the Armenian-Azeri conflict in Baku began. The Musavat and Ittihad parties were accused of Pan-Turkism by the Bolsheviks and their allies. The Armenian and Muslim militias engaged in an armed confrontation, with the formally neutral Bolsheviks tacitly supporting the Armenian side. All the non-Azeri political groups of the city joined the Bolsheviks against the Muslims: Bolsheviks, Dashnaks, Social Revolutionaries, Mensheviks, and even the anti-Bolshevik Kadets found themselves for the first time on the same side of the barricade because they were all fighting "for the Russian cause". Equating the Azeris with the Ottoman Turks, the Dashnaks launched a massacre on the city's Azeris in revenge for the Armenian genocide in the Ottoman Empire. As a result, between 3,000 and 12,000 Muslims were killed in what is known as the March Days. Muslims were expelled from Baku or went underground. At the same time, the Baku Commune was involved in heavy fighting with the advancing Ottoman Caucasian Army of Islam in and around Ganja. Major battles occurred in Yevlakh and Agdash, where the Turks routed and defeated Dashnak and Russian forces.

The Bolshevik account of the events of March 1918 in Baku is presented by Victor Serge in Year One Of the Russian Revolution: "The Soviet at Baku, led by Shaumyan, was meanwhile making itself the ruler of the area, discreetly but unmistakably. Following the Moslem rising of 18 March, it had to introduce a dictatorship. This rising, instigated by the Mussavat, set the Tartar and Turkish population, led by their reactionary bourgeoisie, against the Soviets, which consisted of Russians with support from the Armenians. The races began to slaughter each other in the street. Most of the Turkish port-workers (the ambal) either remained neutral or supported the Reds. The contest was won by the Soviets."

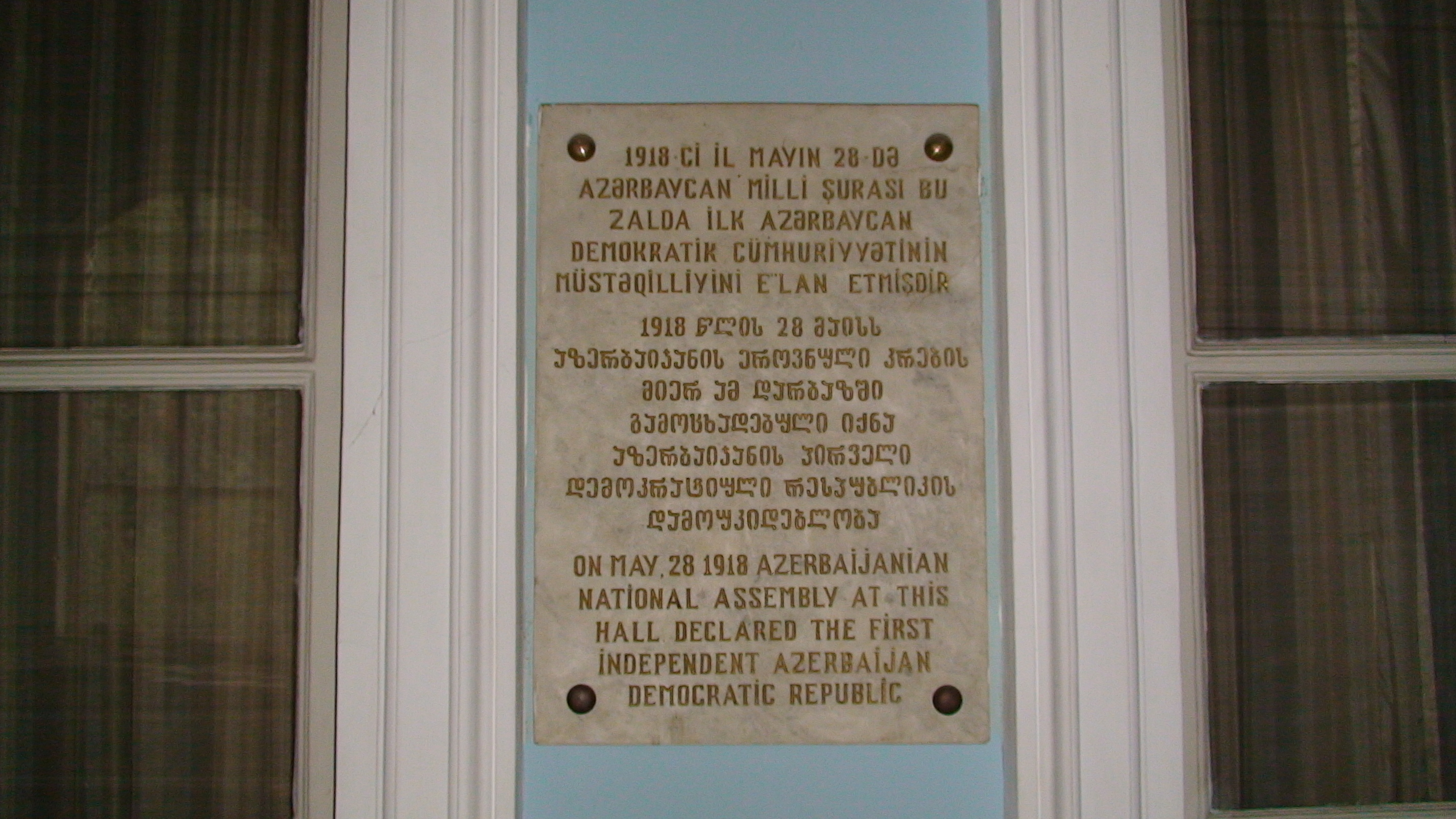
Memorial plaque on the wall of the hall of the building in Tbilisi, where on 28 May 1918, the Azerbaijani National Assembly declared the first independent Azerbaijan Democratic Republic

On 26 May 1918, the Transcaucasian Democratic Federative Republic fell and its bodies were dissolved. The Azerbaijani faction constituted itself into the Azerbaijani National Council (NC). The Azerbaijani National Council immediately undertook parliamentary functions and proclaimed the foundation of the "Azerbaijani Democratic Republic" on 28 May 1918 and declared the National Charter, which read as follows:

1. Azerbaijan is a fully sovereign nation; it consists of the southern and eastern parts of Transcaucasia under the authority of the Azerbaijani people.
2. It is resolved that the form of government of the independent Azerbaijani state is a democratic republic.
3. The Azerbaijani Democratic Republic is determined to establish friendly relations with all, especially with the neighboring nations and states.
4. The Azerbaijani Democratic Republic guarantees to all its citizens within its borders full civil and political rights, regardless of ethnic origin, religion, class, profession, or sex.
5. The Azerbaijani Democratic Republic encourages the free development of all nationalities inhabiting its territory.
6. Until the Azerbaijani Constituent Assembly is convened, the supreme authority over Azerbaijan is vested in a universally elected National Council and the provisional government is responsible to this council.

The council was opposed by ultra-nationalists who accused it of being too left-wing. The council was abolished after the opening of the Parliament on 7 December 1918. This was the first democratic Parliament in the Eastern Muslim world. Alimardan Topchubashov became the chairman of the Parliament while Hasan bey Aghayev was assigned as the deputy chairman. In total, the Parliament held 145 sessions in which more than 270 draft laws were discussed, and 230 of them were adopted. The last emergency meeting of the Parliament was convened on 27 April 1920 after the ultimatum of the Communist Party of Azerbaijan and Baku bureau of the Caucasian Committee of the Russian Communist Party about the surrender of the government to Bolsheviks. Despite the objections of Mammad Amin Rasulzadeh, Shafi bey Rustambayli, and others, the Parliament decided to surrender the government in order not to cause bloodshed. Although they stipulated 7 terms that would guarantee the independence of Azerbaijan, Bolsheviks did not keep their promises, and the Azerbaijan Democratic Republic was occupied on 28 April 1920 by the 11th Army (Russian Empire).

== Policy ==
Despite existing for only two years, the multiparty Azerbaijani Parliamentary republic and the coalition governments managed to achieve a number of measures on the nation and state-building, education, creation of an army, independent financial and economic systems, international recognition of the ADR as a de facto state pending de jure recognition, official recognition and diplomatic relations with a number of states, preparing of a Constitution and equal rights for all. This laid an important foundation for the re-establishment of independence in 1991. However, Parliament was in complicated circumstance, education, the enlightenment of the population was crucial factors in its policy. New schools for girls, hospitals in villages, libraries, courses for teachers were founded in different parts of the country by the Azerbaijan Democratic Republic. The foundation of Baku State University on 1 September 1919, demonstrates that education was an essential factor in the policy of the Azerbaijan Democratic Republic. Although the Azerbaijan Democratic Republic collapsed, Baku State University played great in gaining freedom again in the future. Parliament started to create an opportunity for a young generation to study abroad in order to increase the number of educated people. 100 students were sent abroad with the help of state fund.

=== Domestic ===
Political life in the ADR was dominated by the Musavat Party, the local winner of the Constituent Assembly elections of 1917. The first parliament of the republic opened on 5 December 1918. Musavat had 38 members in parliament, which consisted of 96 deputies, and with some independent MPs formed the biggest faction. The republic was governed by five cabinets (the 6th was being in the process when Azerbaijan was occupied by the Bolsheviks):

Cabinets	Premier	Term
First	Fatali Khan Khoyski	28 May – 17 June 1918
Second	Fatali Khan Khoyski	17 June – 7 December 1918
Third	Fatali Khan Khoyski	26 December 1918 – 14 March 1919
Fourth	Nasib Yusifbeyli	14 April – 22 December 1919
Fifth	Nasib Yusifbeyli	22 December 1919 – 1 April 1920
Sixth	Mammad Hasan Hajinski	aborted

All cabinets were formed by a coalition of Musavat and other parties including the Muslim Socialist Bloc, the Independents, Ehrar, and the Muslim Social Democratic Party. The conservative Ittihad party was the major opposition force and didn't participate in the cabinet formations, except its member was State Inspector General in the last Cabinet. The premier in the first three cabinets was Fatali Khan Khoyski; in the last two, Nasib Yusifbeyli. The formation of the next cabinet was assigned to Mammad Hasan Hajinski, but he was unable to form it, due to lack of time and majority backing in the parliament, and also the Bolshevik invasion. The Chairman of the Parliament, Alimardan Topchubashev, was recognized as the head of state. In this capacity, he represented Azerbaijan at the Versailles Paris Peace Conference in 1919.

=== Foreign relations ===
The main direction of Azerbaijan diplomacy was based on friendly relations with the neighbouring countries regardless of their nationalities and religious beliefs. On the wider world stage, the foreign policy of the ADR can be divided into three periods: the period of Turkish orientation (May to October 1918); Western Orientation Period (November 1918, January 1920); the period of struggle for access to a broader and multilateral worldwide cooperation (January–April 1920). ADR government remained neutral on the issue of the Russian Civil War and never sided with the Red or White Army. Throughout its existence from 1918 to 1920, the Republic of Azerbaijan had diplomatic relations with a number of states. The first peace and friendship treaty of the Republic – Treaty of Batum was signed with the Ottoman Empire. Thus, the Ottoman Empire became the first foreign country to recognize the independence of ADR. Among the representation of the ADR abroad were the Azerbaijani Peace Delegation in Paris, consisting of the chair Alimardan Topchubashev, A.A. Sheykh Ul-Islamov, M. Maharramov, M. Mir-Mehdiyev and advisor B. Hajibayov; Diplomatic Representative to Georgia, Farist Bey Vekilov, to Armenia – Abdurahman Bey Akhverdiyev, advisor Agha Salah Musayev; to Persia – Agha-khan Khiatkhan and his assistant Alakpar Bey Sadikhov; in Constantinople – Yusif Bey Vezirov, his financial advisor, Jangir Bey Gayibov; General Consul in Batumi, Mahmud Bey Efendiyev; Consul to Ukraine, Jamal Sadikhov and Consul in Crimea, Sheykh Ali Useynov. Agreements on the principles of mutual relations were signed with some of them; sixteen states established their missions in Baku.

List of the foreign diplomatic missions in Azerbaijan

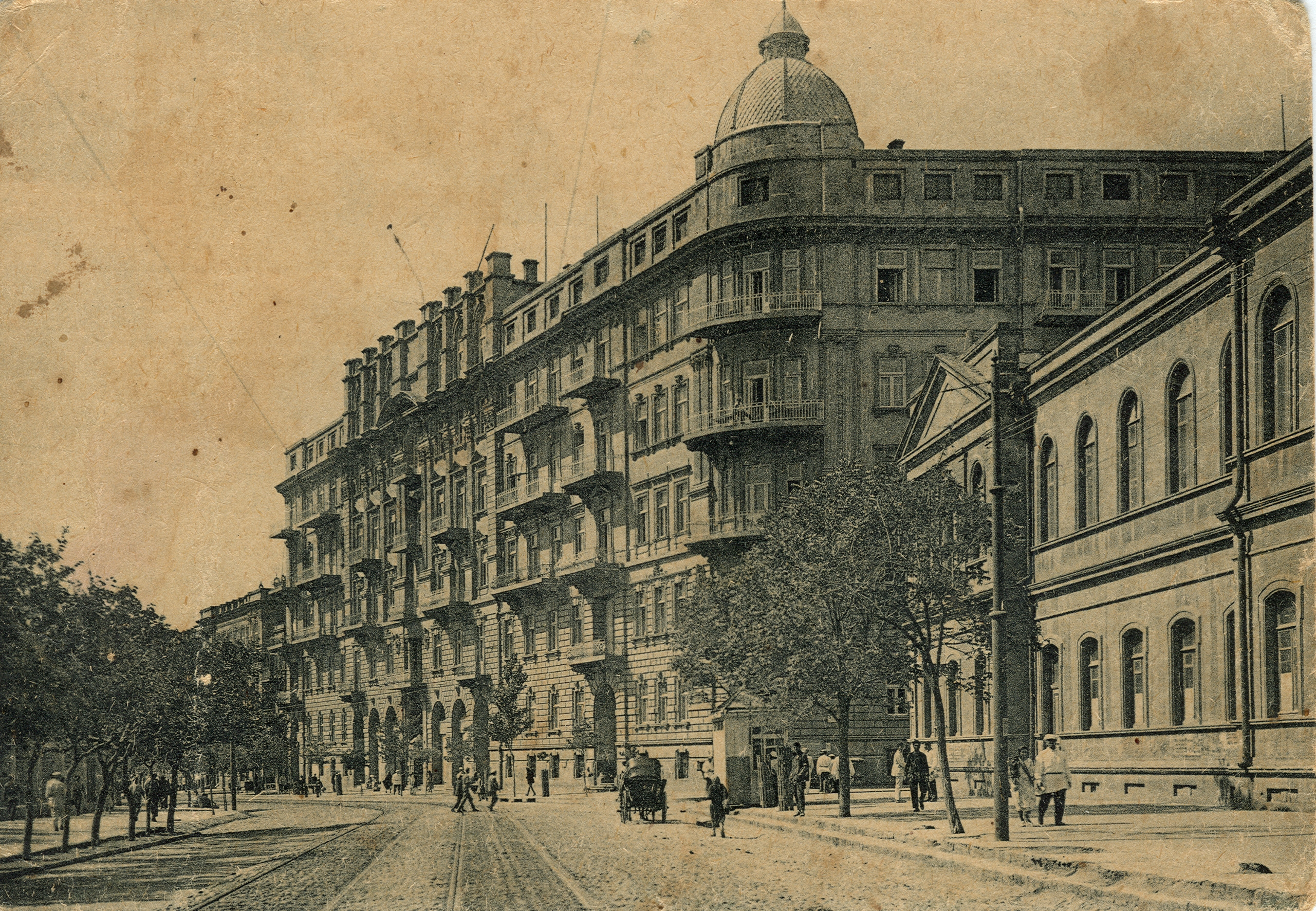
Office of the Ukrainian Mission and Ukrainian National Council in the House of Mirzabeyov brothers on Nikolayevskaya Str, 8

Country	Envoy	Address
United Kingdom	Vice Consul Gevelke	Kladbisshenskaya Str, 11 (Russian-Asian Bank Depository)
Armenia	Diplomatic Representative G.A. Bekzadyan	Telefonnaya Str, 5
Belgium	Consul Ayvazov	Gorchakovskaya Str, 19
Greece	Consul Koussis	Corner of Gogolevskaya and Molokanskaya street
Georgia	Diplomatic Representative Grigol Alshibaia	Politseyskaya Str, 20
Denmark	E.F. Bisring	Birzhevaya Str, 32 (Elektricheskaya Sila company building)
Italy	Chief of the 8th Mission, Enrico Ensom; Consul L. Grikurov	Molokanskaya, 35; Krasnovodskaya, 8
Lithuania	Consul Vincas Mickevičius	Pozenovskaya, 15
Persia	Consul Saad Ul Vizirov	Corner of Gubernskaya Str and Spasskaya Str
Poland	Consul S. Rylsky	Politseyskaya Str, 15
United States	Consul Randolph	Krasnovodskaya Str, 8
Ukraine	Consul Golovan	Nikolayevskaya Str, 8 (Mirzabeyov brothers' house)
Finland	Consul Vegelius	Balaxanı (Nobel Brothers' office)
France	Consul Emelyanov	Vodovoznaya Str. (Mitrofanovs house)
Switzerland	Consul Clateau	Birzhevaya Str, 14
Sweden	Consul R.K. Vander-Ploug	Corner of Persidskaya and Gubernskaya streets

==== Recognition by Allies ====
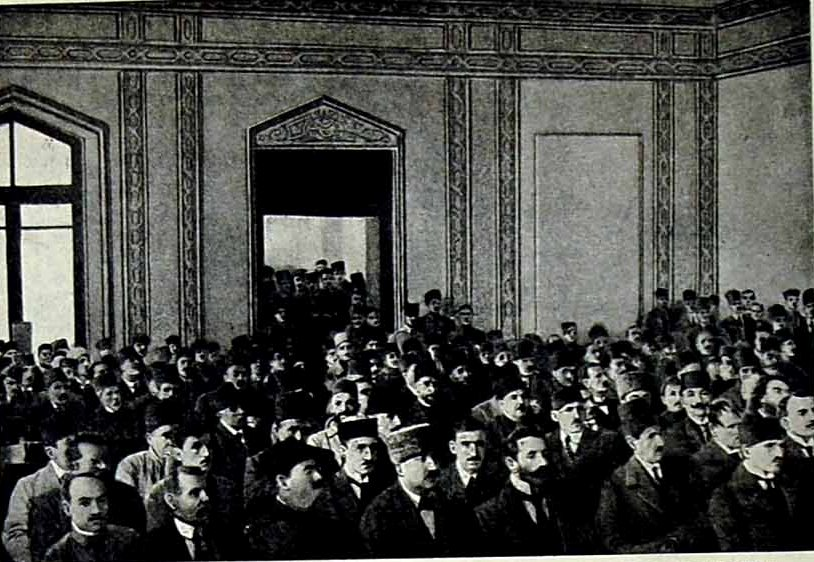
Conference room of the Republic's first parliament

A delegation from Azerbaijan attended the Paris Peace Conference, 1919. Upon its arrival, the Azerbaijani delegation addressed a note to U.S. President Woodrow Wilson, making the following requests:

1. That the independence of Azerbaijan be recognized,
2. That Wilsonian principles be applied to Azerbaijan,
3. That the Azerbaijani delegation be admitted to the Paris Peace Conference,
4. That Azerbaijan be admitted to the League of Nations,
5. That the United States War Department extend military help to Azerbaijan
6. That diplomatic relations be established between the United States of America and the Republic of Azerbaijan.

President Wilson granted the delegation an audience, at which he displayed a cold and rather unsympathetic attitude. As the Azerbaijani delegation reported to its Government, Wilson had stated that the Conference did not want to partition the world into small pieces. Wilson advised Azerbaijan that it would be better for them to develop a spirit of confederation and that such a confederation of all the peoples of Transcaucasia could receive the protection of some Power on the basis of a mandate granted by the League of Nations. The Azerbaijani question, Wilson concluded, could not be solved prior to the general settlement of the Russian question.

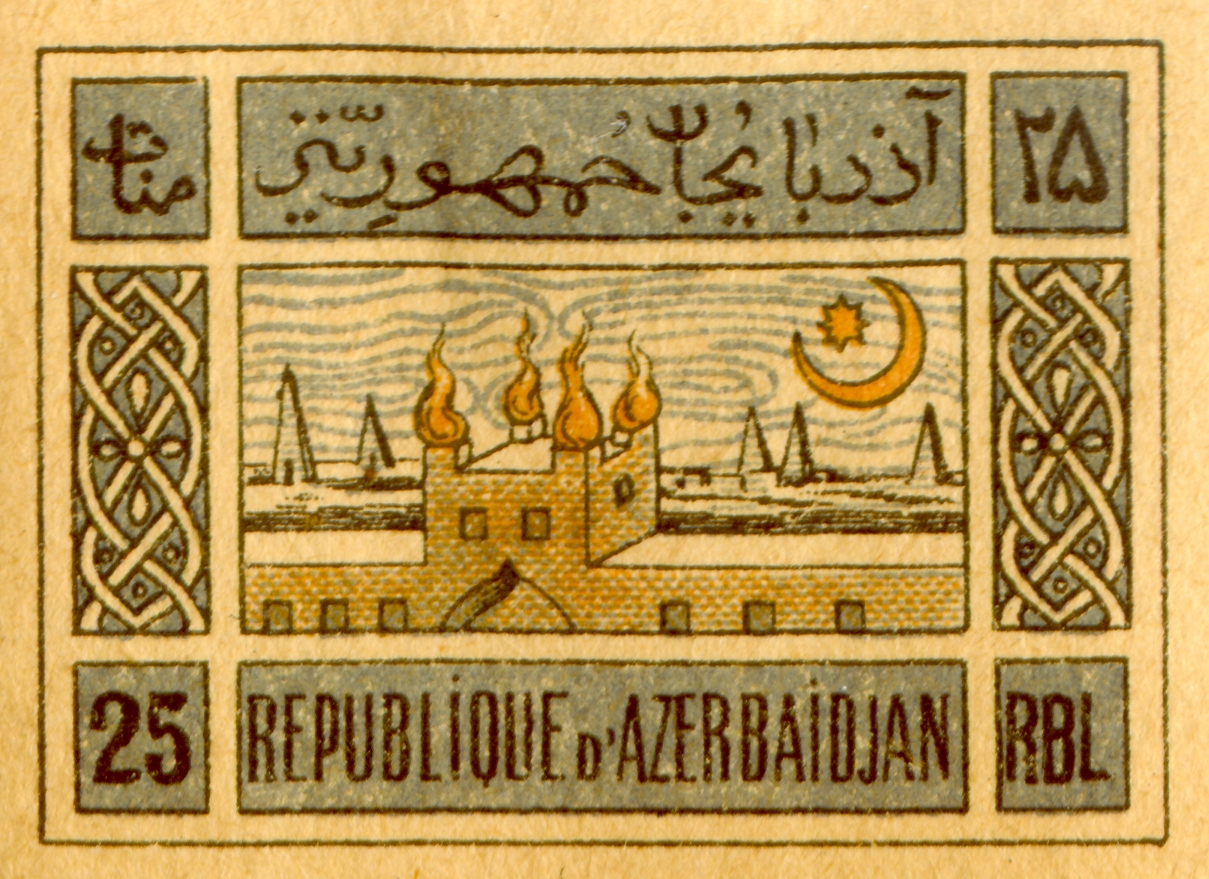
Azerbaijan Democratic Republic postage stamp, 1919

However, despite Wilson's attitude, on 12 January 1920, the Allied Supreme Council extended de facto recognition to Azerbaijan, along with Georgia, and Armenia. Bulletin d'information de l'Azerbaidjan wrote: "The Supreme Council at one of its last sessions recognized the de facto independence of the Caucasian Republics: Azerbaijan, Georgia, and Armenia. The delegation of Azerbaijan and Georgia had been notified of this decision by M. Jules Cambon at the Ministry of Foreign Affairs on 15th January, 1920".

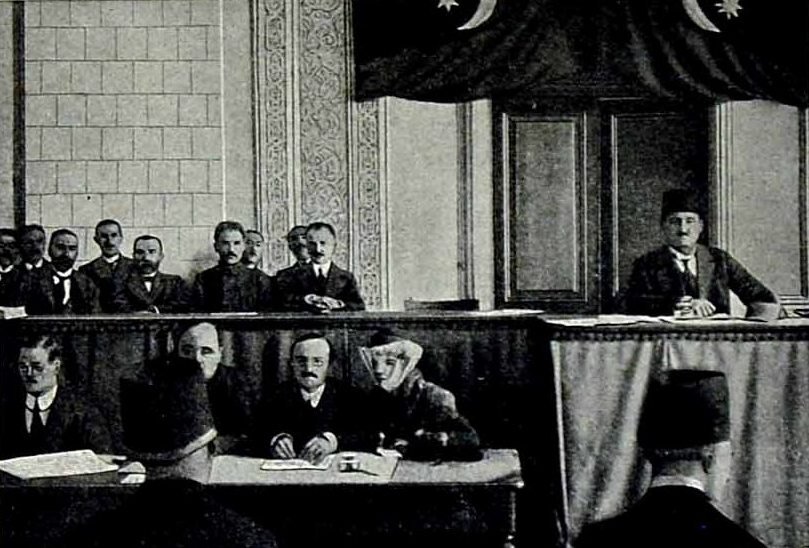
First parliament meeting

Furthermore, in the House of Commons the [British] Under-Secretary for Foreign Affairs, Mr. Greenwood, was asked on what date recognition had been extended to Georgia, Azerbaijan, and Armenia, and whether "in accordance with such recognition, official representatives have been exchanged, and the boundaries of the Transcaucasian Republics defined", Mr. Greenwood replied:

Instructions were sent to the British Chief Commissioner for the Georgian and Azerbaijani Governments that the Allied Powers represented on the Supreme Council had decided to grant de facto recognition of Georgia and Azerbaijan, but that this decision did not prejudge the question of the respective boundaries... There has been no change in representation as a result of recognition; as before, His Majesty's Government have a British Chief Commissioner for the Caucasus with Headquarters at Tiflis, and the three Republics have their accredited representatives in London...

The Allies recognized the Transcaucasian Republics partly because of their fear of Bolshevism, but their activities directed against Bolshevism, at least in Transcaucasia, did not go much beyond words, the strongest of which was status quo, recognition, demarche, and a list of standard diplomatic remonstrances. After the Azerbaijani delegation successfully completed its mission at the Paris Peace Conference, the parliament adopted a law on the establishment of diplomatic missions in France, Great Britain, Italy, the United States, and Poland. In addition, the consulates of Azerbaijan started operating in Tabriz, Khoy, Anzali, Rasht, Ahar, Mashhad, Batumi, Kiev, Crimea, Ashgabat, and elsewhere. Baku, Georgia, Armenia, Iran, Belgium, the Netherlands, Greece, Denmark, Italy, France, Sweden, Switzerland, England, USA, Ukraine, Lithuania, Poland, Finland, Japan, and other countries have official representations at different levels.

==== Persia ====
The name of "Azerbaijan" which the leading Musavat party adopted, for political reasons, was prior to the establishment of the Azerbaijan Democratic Republic in 1918 exclusively used to identify the adjacent region of contemporary northwestern Iran.

According to Tadeusz Swietochowski (1995):

Although the proclamation restricted its claim to the territory north of the Araz River, the use of the name Azerbaijan would soon bring objections from Iran. In Teheran, suspicions were aroused that the Republic of Azerbaijan served as an Ottoman device for detaching the Tabriz province from Iran. Likewise, the national revolutionary Jangali movement in Gilan, while welcoming the independence of every Muslim land as a "source of joy," asked in its newspaper if the choice of the name Azerbaijan implied the new republic's desire to join Iran. If so, they said, it should be stated clearly, otherwise, Iranians would be opposed to calling that republic Azerbaijan. Consequently, to allay Iranian fears, the Azerbaijani government would accommodatingly use the term Caucasian Azerbaijan in its documents for circulation abroad.

According to Hamid Ahmadi (2017):

Though the weak Iranian state was in a transitional period, struggling with foreign domination, the Iranian political and intellectual elites in Tehran and Tabriz, the capital of Iranian Azerbaijan, soon protested against such naming. For almost a year, the printed media in Tehran, Tabriz, and other big Iranian cities on the one side, and the media in Baku, the capital of the newly independent Republic of Azerbaijan, on the other side, presented their arguments to prove that such naming was wrong or right. Iranians were generally suspicious of Baku's choice and regarded confiscating the historical name of Iran's north-western province as a pan-Turkist conspiracy planned by the Ottoman Young Turks, then active in Baku, for their ultimate goal of establishing a pan-Turk entity (Turan) from Central Asia to Europe. By calling the real historical Azerbaijan located in Iran "southern Azerbaijan", the pan-Turkists could claim the necessity of unifying the Republic of Azerbaijan and "southern Azerbaijan" in their future "Turan." Fearing such threats, Shaikh Mohammad Khiabani, a popular member of the political elite in Iranian Azerbaijan and the leader of the Democratic Party (Firqhe Democrat), changed the name of the province to Azadistan (land of freedom). According to Ahmad Kasravi, Khiabani's deputy at the time, the main reason for such a change was to prevent any future claim by the pan-Turkist Ottomans to Iranian Azerbaijan on the basis of the similarity of the names.

On 16 July 1919, the Council of Ministers [of ADR] appointed Adil Khan Ziatkhan, who had up to that time served as Assistant Minister of Foreign Affairs, diplomatic representative of Azerbaijan to the court of the Persian King of Kings. A Persian delegation headed by Seyed Ziaed-Din Tabatai came to Baku, to negotiate transit, tariff, mail, customs, and other such agreements. Speeches were made in which the common bonds between Caucasian Azerbaijan and Iran were stressed.

== Military ==
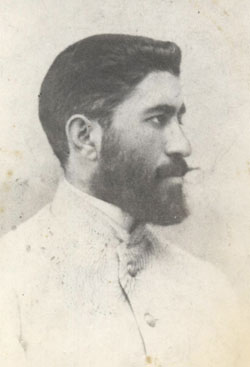
Major General Khosrov bey Sultanov, Minister of Defense of the Azerbaijani Democratic Republic

The ADR military was formed through the work of then acting Minister of Defense Khosrov bey Sultanov. By the fall of the ADR by the invasion of the Red Army, the military had grown to consist of the following units.

- Two infantry divisions consisting of eight regiments, a cavalry division consisting of three regiments and two artillery brigades. In addition to these, there were a number of auxiliary detachments, sections and enterprises in the army.

== Territorial disputes ==
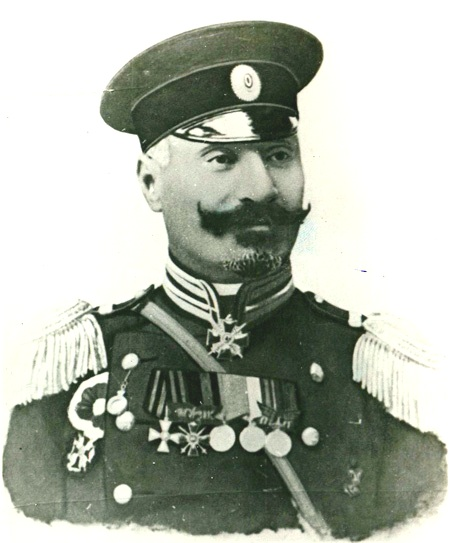
Ali-Agha Shikhlinski was a Lieutenant-General of the Imperial Russian Army and the Deputy Minister of Defense and General of the Artillery of the Azerbaijan Democratic Republic.

Much like its other counterparts in the Caucasus, the ADR's early years of existence were plagued with territorial disputes. In particular, these included disputes with the First Republic of Armenia (Nakhchivan, Nagorno-Karabakh, Zangezur (today the Armenian province of Syunik), and Qazakh) and the Democratic Republic of Georgia (Balakan, Zaqatala, and Qakh). The ADR also claimed territories of the Mountainous Republic of the Northern Caucasus (Derbent), but they were not as persistent about these claims as they were about the territories they disputed between Armenia and Georgia.

=== Armenian-Azerbaijani war ===
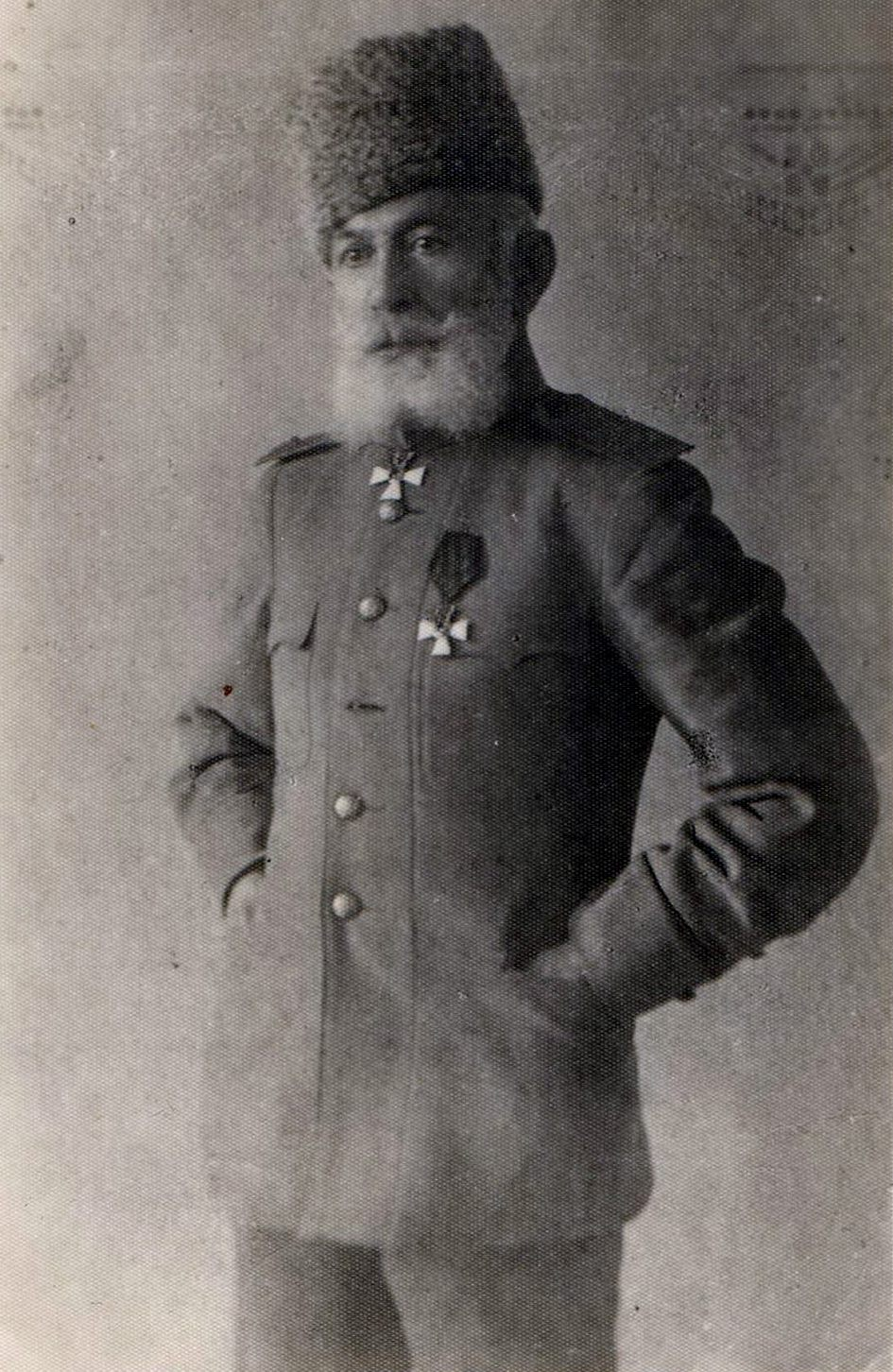
Samad bey Mehmandarov was a General of the Artillery in Imperial Russian Army before becoming the Azerbaijan Democratic Republic's Minister of Defense.

In the summer of 1918, the Dashnaks, together with the SRs and the Mensheviks, expelled the Bolsheviks, who refused to ask for British support, and founded the Centro Caspian Dictatorship (1 August 1918 – 15 September 1918). The CCD was supported by the British who sent an expeditionary force to Baku to help the Armenians and the Mensheviks. The purpose of the British forces (led by Major General Lionel Dunsterville, who arrived from Persia's Enzeli at the head of a 1,000-strong elite force) was to seize the oil fields in Baku ahead of Enver Pasha's advancing Turkish troops (Army of Islam) or the Kaiser's German troops (who were in neighboring Georgia) and to block a Bolshevik consolidation in the Caucasus and Central Asia.

The city of Baku only became the capital of the Republic in September 1918.

Unable to resist advancing Turkish troops during the Battle of Baku, Dunsterville ordered the evacuation of the city on 14 September, after six weeks of occupation, and withdrew to Iran; most of the Armenian population escaped with the British forces. The Ottoman Army of Islam and its Azeri allies, led by Nuri Pasha, entered Baku on 15 September and slaughtered between 10,000 – 20,000 Armenians in retaliation for the March massacre of Muslims. The capital of the ADR was finally moved from Ganja to Baku. However, after the Armistice of Mudros between Great Britain and Turkey on 30 October, Turkish troops were replaced by the Allies of World War I. Headed by British general William Montgomery Thomson, who had declared himself the military governor of Baku, 5,000 Commonwealth soldiers arrived in Baku on 17 November 1918. By General Thomson's order, martial law was implemented in Baku.

=== Fight for survival ===
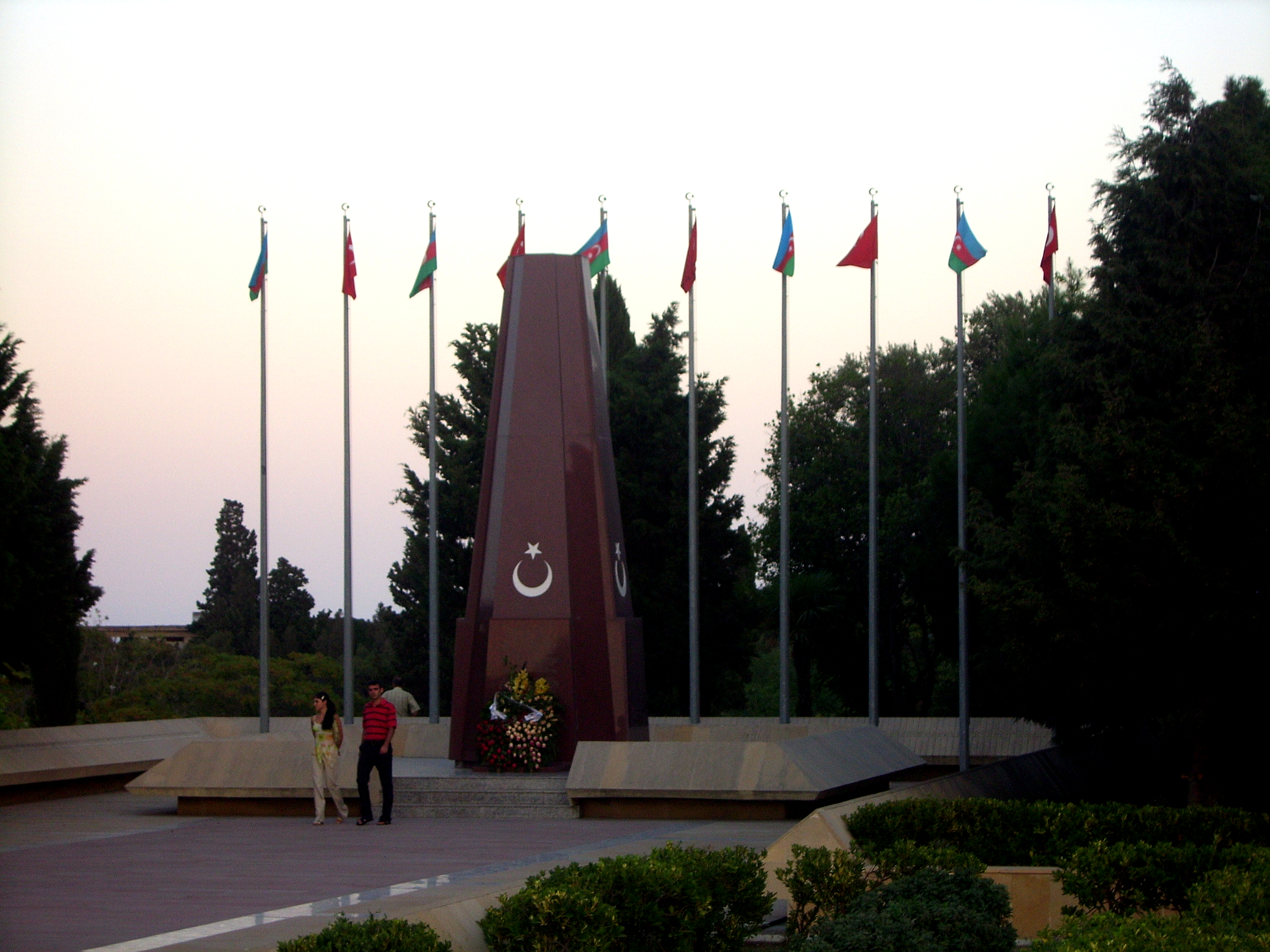
Memorial to Turkish soldiers killed in the Battle of Baku

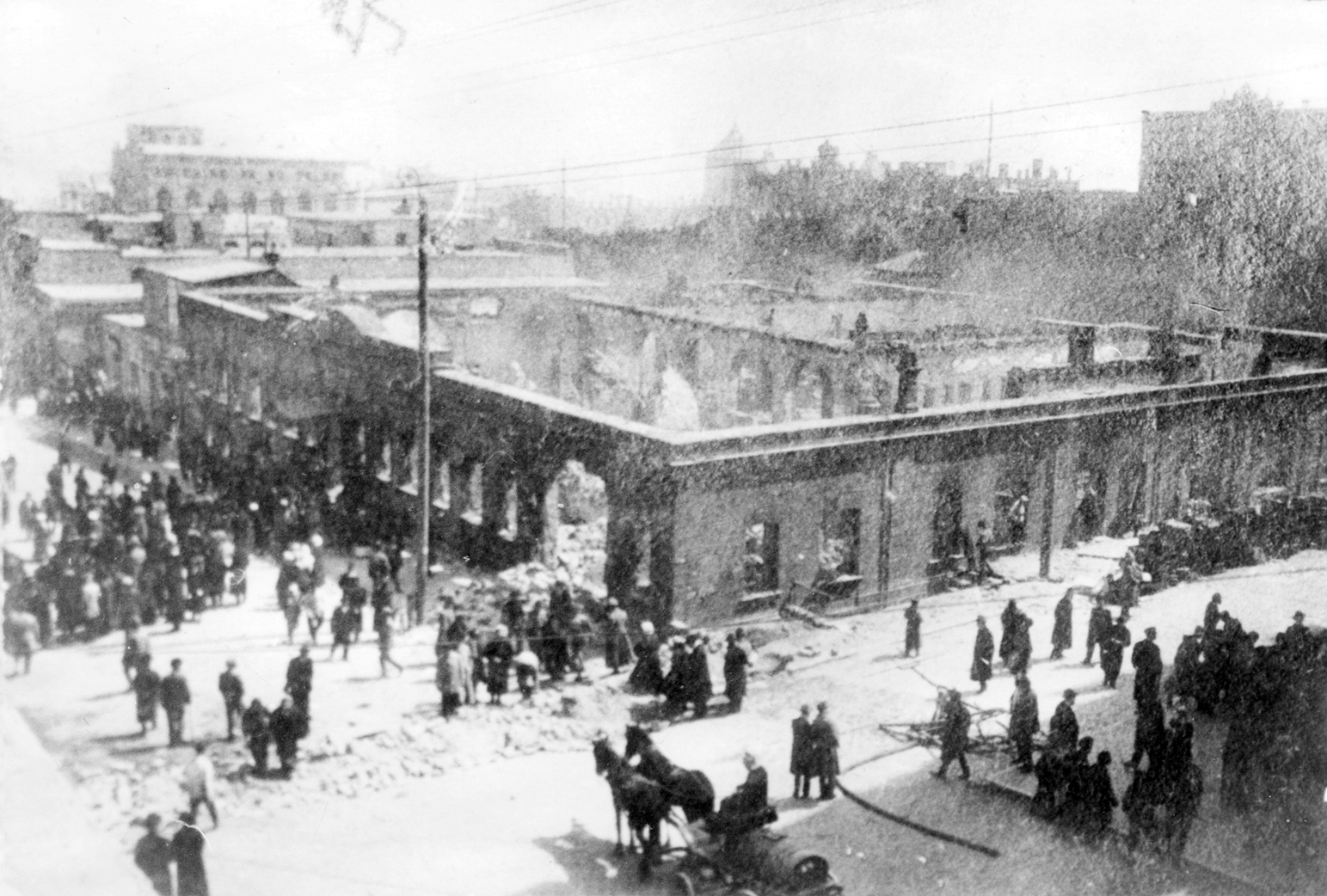
Remains of the editorial offices of the Kaspi newspaper on Baku's Nikolayevskaya Street (modern-day Istiqlaliyyet Street), ruined during the March Days in 1918

The ADR found itself in a difficult position, hemmed in from the north by advancing Denikin forces, unfriendly Iran in the south; the British administration was not hostile but indifferent to the plight of Muslims. General Thomson initially did not recognize the republic but tacitly cooperated with it. On 25 April 1919, a violent protest organized by Talysh workers of pro-Bolshevik orientation exploded in Lankaran and deposed the Mughan Territorial Administration, a military dictatorship led by Russian colonel T. P. Sukhorukov. On 15 May, the Extraordinary Congress of the "Councils of Workers' and Peasants' Deputies" of Lankaran district proclaimed the Mughan Soviet Republic. By mid-1919 the situation in Azerbaijan had more or less stabilized, and British forces left on 19 August 1919.

This made the ADR pursue a neutral policy with regard to the Russian Civil War. On 16 June 1919, the ADR and Georgia signed a defensive treaty against the White troops of General Anton Denikin's Volunteer Army who were threatening to start an offensive on their borders. Denikin concluded a secret military pact with Armenia. The Republic of Armenia with its forces formed the 7th corps of Denikin's army and gained military support from the White Movement. This fact increased the tension between the ADR and Armenia. However, the war never materialized as by January 1920, Denikin's army was completely defeated by the XI Red Army, which later started to concentrate its troops on Azerbaijan's borders.

Armenia and Azerbaijan were engaged in fighting over Karabakh for some part of 1919. The fighting increased in intensity by February 1920 and martial law was introduced in Karabakh, which was enforced by the newly formed National Army, led by general Samedbey Mehmandarov.

== Fall of the Azerbaijan Democratic Republic (April 1920) ==
The Baku secession in 1918 was a sensitive strike for Soviet Russia, and it caused heavy consequences during economic warfare. Moscow's intention to regain control of the vitally necessary region was strong and coherent, and on its way, the Soviet government was ready to accept any concession.

In 1918 and 1919 Soviet Russia rejected all attempts made by the ADR to establish diplomatic relations between the two. 1920 was marked by a diplomatic dispatch which started with a radiogram sent by Minister of Foreign Affairs Georgy Chicherin, which said: "The government of the Russian Socialist Federative Republic reverts to Azerbaijan with an initiative to immediately launch talks with the Soviet government aiming at acceleration and finishing of the White army bodies in the South of Russia". In his response, Fatali Khan Khoyski, the head of the Azerbaijan government, insisted on non-interference in the internal affairs of the country. The Soviets considered this position as support rendered by Azerbaijan to the White army led by Denikin, and lobby of the British interests on the Caspian Sea.

Following the adoption of the name of "Azerbaijan" by the Azerbaijan Democratic Republic, a naming dispute arose with Qajar Iran, with the latter protesting this decision. In tandem with this naming controversy however, the young Azerbaijan Republic also faced a threat from the nascent Soviets in Moscow and the Armenians. In order to escape the possibility of a Soviet invasion and an even greater imminent threat of an Armenian invasion, Muslim Nakhchivan proposed annexing to Iran. The then pro-British government in Tehran led by Vossug ed Dowleh made endeavours amongst Baku's leadership to join Iran. In order to promote this idea, Vosugh ed Dowleh dispatched two separate Iranian delegations; one to Baku and one to the Paris Peace Conference in 1919.

In 1919 Azerbaijan left parties including the Baku organization of the Russian communist party, "Gummet" and "Adalet", started consolidating and by the end of the year, the Azerbaijan Communist Party (ACP) was created. The ACP held an active agitation campaign in Baku and its region and was supported by Russia.

In 1920 the Soviet government established a strong relationship with the new Turkish government headed by Mustafa Kemal. The Soviets were ready to supply Turkey with armaments in exchange for Turkish military support in Azerbaijan. Turkey particularly suggested using military bodies formed in Dagestan to occupy Baku and to avoid exploding its petrol storage reservoirs. Turkish support played an important role and attracted the Bolsheviks the sympathies of the Muslim population in Azerbaijan.

By March 1920, it was obvious that the economic and political situation in the ADR had reached a crucial point. In accordance with the analysis made by the Bolsheviks, the ADR government received weak support from the people and this should have provided success to the operation. Vladimir Lenin said that the invasion was justified by the fact that Soviet Russia could not survive without Baku oil.

The Iranian delegation at Baku, at the behest of Zia ol Din Tabatabaee, held intensive negotiations with the leadership of the Musavat party during the increasing chaos and instability in the city. During the closing stages, an accord was reached between them; however, before the idea was presented to Vossug ed Dowleh in Tehran, the Communists took over Baku and terminated the Musavat-Ottoman rule. The Iranian delegation at Paris, which was headed by foreign minister Firouz Nosrat-ed-Dowleh III, reached a unity negotiation with the delegation from Baku and signed a confederation agreement, which, in the end, would prove to be of no avail.

After a major political crisis, the Fifth Cabinet of Ministers of the Azerbaijan Democratic Republic resigned on 1 April 1920. At the beginning of April 1920, the Russian XI Red Army reached the border of Azerbaijan and prepared to attack. The official date of the operation is considered 25 April 1920, when the Azerbaijan Communist Party transformed the party's cells into military bodies, which were to take part in the attack. On 27 April 1920, the Provisional Revolutionary Committee with Nariman Narimanov as chairman was established and issued the ADR Government an ultimatum. The labor military detachments managed to occupy oilfields, state offices, post offices. Police regiments defected to the rebels. To avoid bloodshed, the deputies complied with the demand and the ADR officially ceased to exist on 28 April 1920, giving way to the Azerbaijan Soviet Socialist Republic (Azerbaijan SSR) as its successor state although the ADR would be legally succeeded by the restored contemporary Republic of Azerbaijan on 18 October 1991.

The Red Army, which entered Baku by 30 April 1920, met very little resistance in Baku from Azerbaijani forces, which were tied up on the Karabakh front. The first Communist government of Azerbaijan consisted almost entirely of native Azerbaijanis from the left factions of the Hummat and Adalat parties.

In May 1920, there was a major uprising against the occupying Russian XI Army in Ganja, intent on restoring Musavatists in power. The uprising was crushed by government troops by 31 May. Leaders of the ADR either fled to the Democratic Republic of Georgia, Turkey and Iran, or were captured by the Bolsheviks and executed, including Gen. Selimov, Gen. Sulkevich, Gen. Agalarov: a total of over 20 generals (Mammed Amin Rasulzade was later allowed to emigrate), or assassinated by Armenian militants like Fatali Khan Khoyski and Behbudagha Javanshir. Most students and citizens traveling abroad remained in those countries, never to return. Other prominent ADR military figures like former Minister of Defense General Samedbey Mehmandarov and deputy defense minister General Ali-Agha Shikhlinski (who was called "the God of Artillery" ) were at first arrested, but then released two months later thanks to efforts of Nariman Narimanov. Gen. Mehmandarov and Gen. Shikhlinsky spent their last years teaching in the Azerbaijan SSR military school.

In the end, "the Azeris did not surrender their brief independence of 1918-20 quickly or easily. As many as 20,000 died resisting what was effectively a Russian reconquest." However, the installation of the Azerbaijan Soviet Socialist Republic was made easier by the fact that there was certain popular support for Bolshevik ideology in Azerbaijan, in particular among the industrial workers in Baku.

== Succession ==
Azerbaijan Democratic Republic was succeeded by the Republic of Azerbaijan when the country regained independence in 1991 with collapse of the USSR. The Constitution of the Republic of Azerbaijan acknowledges the principles of the Constitutional Act on the State Independence of the Republic of Azerbaijan which has declared that Azerbaijan is the heir of the Republic of Azerbaijan that existed from 28 May 1918 until 28 April 1920 in its Article 2. The Republic of Azerbaijan has adopted the national flag of the Azerbaijan Democratic Republic and some national holidays, including the Republic Day (Azerbaijan), Day of the Armed Forces of Azerbaijan, Day of the National Security Service Officers etc. are linked with it as the current governmental bodies are considered heirs of the 1918-1920 Republic.

== Maps ==
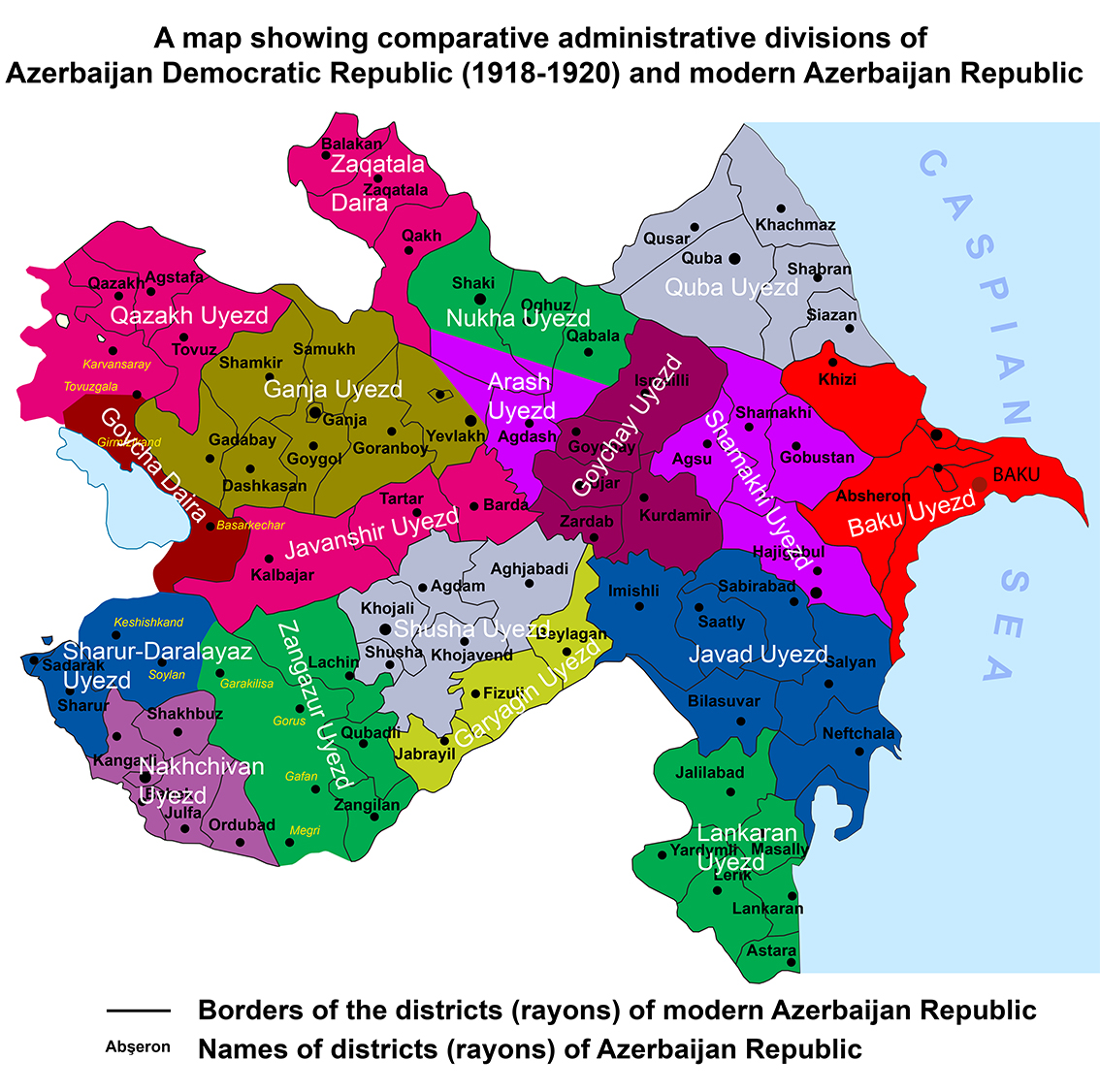
A map showing comparative administrative divisions of the Azerbaijan Democratic Republic (1918–20) compared to modern Azerbaijan Republic (Note: Map does not show the disputed territories of Azerbaijan Democratic Republic, so it's important to note that not everything included in the map was under Azerbaijani control)

== See also ==
- First cabinet of Azerbaijan Democratic Republic
- History of the name "Azerbaijan"
- Azerbaijan
- Azerbaijan SSR
- March Days
- Mammed Amin Rasulzade
- Democratic Republic of Georgia
- First Republic of Armenia
