= Members of the Parliament of the Azerbaijan Democratic Republic =

Members of the Parliament of the Azerbaijan Democratic Republic or Legislative Base of the Azerbaijan Republic (Azerbaijani: آذرنایحان جمهوریتی مجلس مبوثان اعضاسی) were the members of the Parliament of the Azerbaijan Democratic Republic, which was established as a continuation of the Azerbaijani National Council on December 7, 1918, as the legislative body of the Azerbaijan Democratic Republic.

Although the results of the elections to the Transcaucasian Sejm, held in 1917, were recognized, the parliament was dissolved by the Bolsheviks on the first day. After the October Revolution, the federative state of Georgia, Azerbaijan, and Armenia united under the name of the Transcaucasian Democratic Federative Republic. The members of the Transcaucasian Sejm, the legislative body of this republic, were ensured by an increase in the number of Muslim members elected to the Transcaucasian Sejm, which was achieved by increasing the number of Azerbaijani members four times. After the Social Democratic Party of Georgia, the Musavat and the democratic allies formed the Muslim faction of the Transcaucasian Sejm, led by the Musavat and the democratic allies, which had the second largest number of national deputies after the Social Democratic Party of Georgia. On May 27, 1918, this faction formed the basis of the Azerbaijani National Council. On May 28, 1918, Azerbaijan declared its independence. After that, taking into account the impossibility of holding local elections and the creation of the National Council's Parliament, which decided to call the Assembly of the Republic of Azerbaijan, which decided to call the Assembly of the Republic of Azerbaijan, the National Council adopted the "Law on Elections to the Azerbaijani Parliament" on November 19, 1918. According to this law, the Parliament of the Azerbaijan Democratic Republic, which was to consist of 120 members, was to be expanded and new members were to be elected on the principle of expansion of the number of members. The Parliament of the Azerbaijan Democratic Republic held its first session on December 7, 1918. During the activity of the parliament, its internal regulations were adopted. Based on these regulations, members were accepted and expelled. Transfers of members between factions within the parliament were frequent.

The extraordinary session of the parliament, which took place due to the ultimatum sent by the Bolshevik government to take over, was the last session of the parliament. Thus, on April 27, 1918, the activities of the parliament were terminated.

== Background ==
=== Transcaucasian Sejm ===
The Transcaucasian Sejm, established in Tiflis in February 1918 by deputies elected from Transcaucasia, as a governing body. Its last session was held on May 26, 1918. The Sejm consisted of four Muslim parties represented by 44 deputies: the Musavat and the democratic allies, the Muslim Socialist Bloc, the "Unity" party in Russia, and the Muslim Social-Democratic (Menshevik) Party "Hummat". These 44 deputies from the four Muslim parties were represented in the Muslim faction of the Transcaucasian Sejm. On May 26, 1918, the Transcaucasian Democratic Federative Republic declared its independence from the Democratic Republic of Georgia. The next day, on May 27, a special session was called by the former Muslim faction of the Transcaucasian Sejm. The purpose of the session was to discuss the current political situation, and all members of the former Muslim faction of the Transcaucasian Sejm agreed to declare Azerbaijan's independence, establish an independent state, take control of Azerbaijan's administration, and create a Temporary National Council.

=== National Council ===
On May 28, the first session of the Azerbaijan National Council was held at the former residence of the Caucasian viceroy in Tiflis. Although some sources indicate that there were 44 members in the National Council, other sources confirm that Musa bey Rafiyev and Nariman bey Narimanbeyli were also members.

On May 28, the Azerbaijan National Council held its first session at the former Caucasian viceroy's palace in Tiflis. The National Council adopted a historic decision on declaring an independent state of the South-East Caucasus, accepted the Declaration of Independence, and held a vote. Twenty-four members voted in favor of independence, while two members (Sultan Majid Ganizade and Jafar Akhundov) remained neutral. The six-point declaration was signed by Hasan bey Agayev, Fatali Khan Khoyski, Nasib bey Yusifbeyli, Jamo bey Hajinski, Shafi bey Rustambeyli, Nariman bey Narimanbeyli, Javad bey Malik-Yeganov, and Mustafa Mahmudov.

The Temporary National Council elected Mohammad Amin Rasulzadeh as its chairman and Hasan bey Agayev as his deputy. Fatali Khan Khoyski was elected as the head of the executive committee.

After the adoption of the historic decision to declare Azerbaijan an independent state at the first session of the National Council on May 28, 1918, the session resumed after a one-hour break. Fatali Khan Khoyski, who was tasked with forming the first Azerbaijani government, announced the composition of the temporary government. However, the move of the Azerbaijani National Council and the Government to Ganja on June 16, 1918, caused political turmoil. In these complex political conditions, it was decided to dissolve the Azerbaijani National Council to protect and preserve Azerbaijan's state independence, and all legislative and executive powers were transferred to the Temporary government led by Fatali Khan Khoyski, with no one else being allowed to intervene except in the Temporary National Council, which was to be convened within six months. The government of Fatali Khan Khoyski started preparations for the convening of the Constituent Assembly. For this purpose, a special commission was created. Despite the fact that only six months had passed since the decision of the National Council, which gave the government the authority to continue its rule alone, based on the initiative and appeal of Fatali Khan Khoyski, the Azerbaijani National Council resumed its activities on November 16, 1918. At the suggestion of Fatali Khan Khoyski, the Azerbaijani National Council took over the task of convening the Constituent Assembly.

On November 19, 1918, at the meeting of the National Council chaired by Mohammad Amin Rasulzadeh, the National Council adopted a law on the convocation of the Constituent Assembly of the expanded Azerbaijani Parliament, and suspended its activities.

The National Council and the first government continued their activities in Baku from June 16 to November 16, 1918, until the opening of the first Parliament.

==== Changes in Membership ====
- On May 29, 1918, during the 2nd session of the Shura, Teymur bey Makinsky's membership is unanimously accepted.
- On June 1, 1918, during the 3rd session held in Tiflis, the Hummat proposed the membership of Gasim bay Jamalbayov in place of Jafar Akhundov, and the proposal was accepted.
- On December 1, 1918, in a secret session, with the statement of Fatali Khan Khoyski and the abstention of Mahammad Amin Rasulzade, the request of the Slavic-Rus Society to elect members of parliament from the areas allocated to Russians (the Russian National Council had refused these areas) was accepted.
- At the last session of the Shura on December 4, 1918, 2 candidates from the Shamakhi district (Yusif Ahmadzade and Habib bay Mahmudbayov) were nominated by local committees, and 3 candidates (Aliheydar Garayev, Asaf bay Shikhalibayov and Agha bay Safaraliyev) were nominated by elders' councils. Yusif Əhmədzadə was automatically disqualified from the candidacy as he had already become a member of the Trade and Industry Union, leaving the selection to be made from the remaining 4 candidates. In a secret vote, Asaf bay Shikhalibayov received 11 votes, Aliheydar Garayev received 9, and Habib bay Mahmudbayov received 1 vote. Asif bay Shikhalibayov was thus elected as a member of the Shura.

== Parliament ==
=== Opening ===
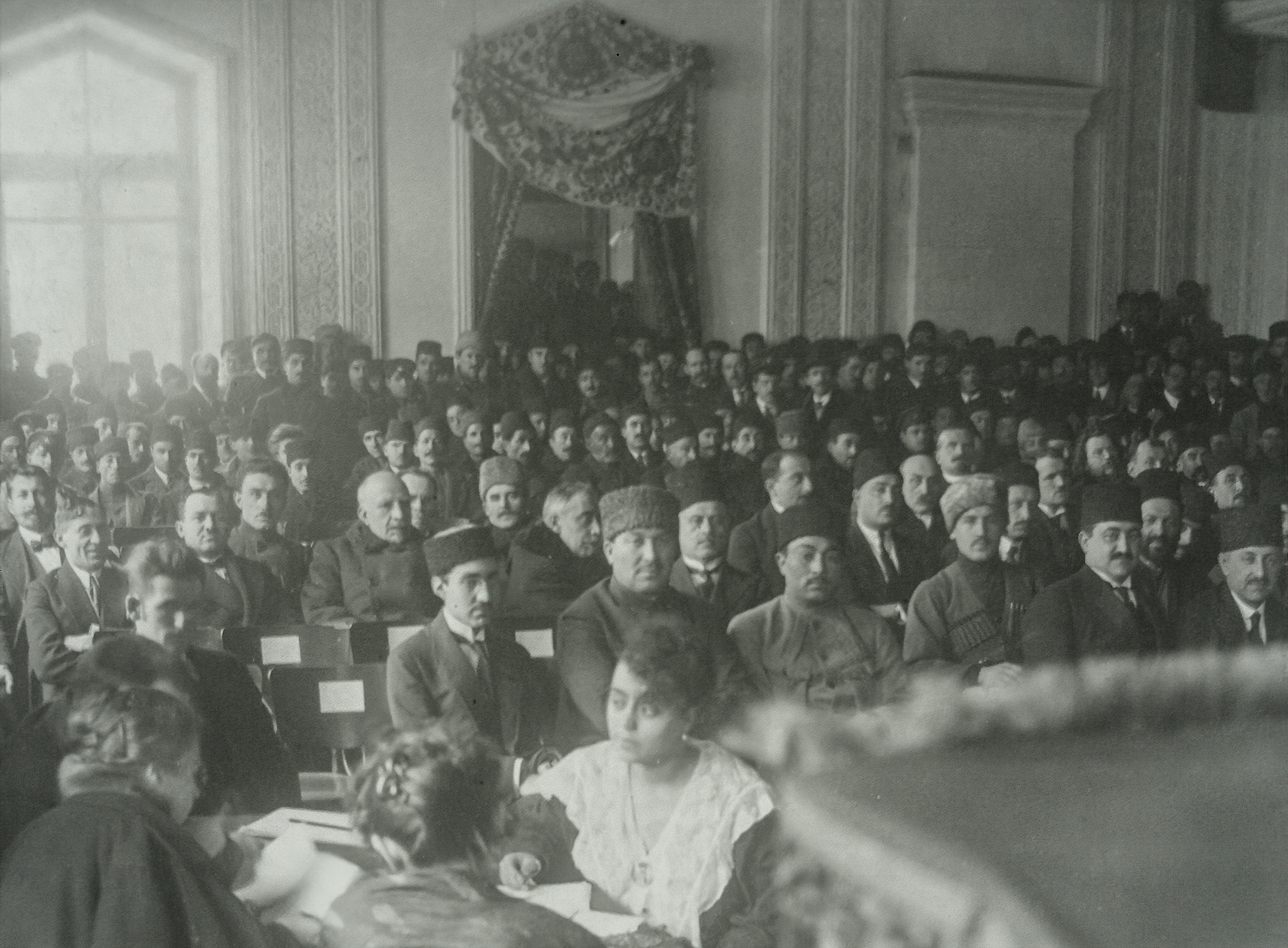
Session of the Parliament of the Azerbaijan Democratic Republic

At the session of the Azerbaijan National Council held on November 19, 1918, under the chairmanship of Mahammad Amin Rasulzade, laws related to the parliament were adopted, and a decision was made that all nations living within the state's borders should be represented. According to the information provided in the Caucasian calendar, there were 2,750,000 people in these territories. Of these, 1,900,000 were Muslim, 500,000 were Armenian, and 230,000 were Russian. Muslims were to be represented by 1 delegate for every 24,000 people, Armenians by 1 for every 72,000, and Russians by 1 for every 23,000.

Thus, it was decided to form the Azerbaijan Parliament consisting of 120 members. According to the law, out of the 21 Armenian delegates to be elected to the Parliament, 8 were to be from Ganja, 8 from Shusha, and 5 from Baku Armenian committees. From the Russian population in Baku, 10 were to be sent by the Russian National Council, 1 by the German National Council, 1 by the Jewish National Council, 1 by the Georgian National Council, and 1 from the Polish committee. In addition, the law provided for the sending of 3 delegates by the Baku Trades Unions Council and 2 by the Baku Industrial and Commercial Council. Members of the Parliament had immunity from prosecution.

According to the decision of the session of the Azerbaijan National Council held on November 19, 1918, 44 Turk-Muslim delegates, elected to the All-Russian Constituent Assembly in late 1917, were to be included in the composition of the newly created parliament. The remaining 36 deputies from the Muslims and representatives of other nationalities were to be re-elected. The formation of the new Parliament was to be completed by December 3, 1918.

In connection with the convocation of the Azerbaijan Republic Parliament, on behalf of the Azerbaijan National Council, a "Statement to All Azerbaijani People!" was published in Azerbaijani and Russian on November 29, 1918, signed by its president, Mahammad Amin Rasulzade.

On December 7, 1918, at 13:00, the solemn opening of the Azerbaijan Parliament took place in the building of the former Girls' School on Nikolayev Street (now the building of the Institute of Manuscripts of Azerbaijan).

=== Internal Rules ===
On January 16, 1919, during the eighth session of the parliament, the Musavat and its leader, Mahammad Amin Rasulzade, presented a draft law to the parliament titled "Draft Law on Members of Parliament not Present in the Parliament":

# MPs who have not attended the parliament and have not given a reason for their absence within a month and a half from the opening of the parliament shall be expelled from the parliament.

1. MPs who leave the parliament without informing the presidium within a month and a half shall be considered to have left the parliament.
2. In such cases, a new member shall be elected by the idea or organization that elected the member.

The draft law was unanimously adopted. During the same session, the Musavat also presented the "Non-Public" draft law to the parliament. According to this law, members of the Parliament could not hold government office at any time. Stanislav Vansovich objected to this law and proposed that it be referred to the commission

. Mikhail Vinogradov and Aslan bey Gardashov also approved this proposal. The law was submitted to the commission with the condition that it be returned to the parliament within 10 days for further consideration.

On January 25, 1919, during the ninth session of the parliament, the "Non-Public" law, which had been examined by the commission, was discussed:

* Members of the Parliament cannot hold government office. However, ministers who are members of the Parliament have the right to hold office. If another official becomes a member, it is up to them to accept or reject membership. However, if they accept membership, they must resign from their office.

  - Note 1: School teachers, professors, and specialists who do not perform administrative duties and are in a special position in state institutions are exceptions to the above decision;
  - Note 2: This exception applies only when the Parliament is in session and applies to individuals in office.
- Members of the Parliament receive their salaries only from the Ministry of Ministers for the duration of their membership.
- This law is in force from the date of publication.
- From the date of publication of this law, members of the state service who are in Baku must resign from their position and apply to the Parliament within 3 days, and those outside Baku must do so within 10 days. If they do not do so, they will be considered to have accepted the office and resigned from the membership.

Although the draft law sparked debates, it was unanimously adopted after a defense by Mahammad Amin Rasulzade. After the adoption of the law, it was announced at the 4th February 1919 session of the parliament that the seminar director Firudin bey Kocharli and the deputy justice minister Teymur bey Makinsky had resigned from their membership. It was also announced that Colonel Vladimir Ollongren from the Slavic-Rus Society, Abdulla Gabulzade, Bahram bey Vazirov, Bayram Niyazi Kichikkhanli, Ali bay Zizikski, Haji Huseyn Afandizade, and Rashid bey Akhundzadeh had resigned from government service and accepted membership of the parliament. Governor of Ganja Ibrahim agha Vakilov, Governor of Baku Museyib bey Akhijanov, Jamil bay Lambaranski, Aliagha Hasanov, Sadykh bey Aghabeyov, Mammad Yusif Jafarov, and Hamid bey Shahtakhtinski were expelled from the parliament according to the "non-public" law. Ahmed bey Pepinov and Jamo bey Hajinski suggested that Mammad Yusif Jafarov and Ibrahim agha Vakilov should not be expelled due to their permissions, and the rest should be expelled. The proposal was accepted.

Resignations continued thereafter. At the 5th February 1919 session of the parliament, Governor of Ganja Ibrahim agha Vakilov announced his resignation from membership. At the 28th January 1919 session of the parliament, it was announced that Sultan Majid Ganizade had resigned from the Ministry of Education and accepted membership. At the 3rd April 1919 session of the parliament, it was announced that Yusifəli Əliyev had left government service.

Khosrov bey Sultanov was appointed as the Qarabag governor on January 15.

=== Committees ===
There were 11 committees active in the parliament. In addition to several permanent committees, temporary committees were also sometimes active. For example, there was a temporary "General Amnesty" committee formed to prepare for the amnesty decision related to the opening of the parliament, a special committee created for the investigation of Ali Bayramov's murder, and a special committee for selecting students to be sent abroad. The names of some committees varied. For example, the "Organization and Supplies" committee was later renamed the "Supplies" committee, and the legislative committee was sometimes called the draft or legislative-committee. After the adoption of the internal regulations of the parliament, the activities of the committees began to be regulated. According to the regulations, if a committee does not hold any sessions within a month, it will be dissolved, and its members will be dismissed. For example, the equipment and supplies committee, later renamed the supplies committee, and the land committee were dissolved on April 14 and April 24, respectively, according to the regulations. During the adoption of the regulations, the creation of a new budget committee was considered, but after discussions, it was merged with the finance committee under the name of the finance-budget committee due to its similar functions. In October 1919, a Central Election Commission consisting of 21 members was formed. After its establishment, at the 13th October 1919 session of the parliament, the draft committee for the elections of the Constituent Assembly officially completed its work. On January 5, 1920, at the 114th session of the parliament, a new "Inspection" committee was formed. At the 15th April 1920 session of the parliament, a special committee was created to oversee the investigation of Ali Bayramov's murder.

== List ==
The members of the Parliament of the Azerbaijan Democratic Republic are listed below. As some information about certain members is incomplete, the list is not exhaustive. The section on their positions provides information on their membership in various commissions at different times. The date of election indicated is the date when the members entered the parliament and were presented to the credentials committee. Sometimes, another date is given within parentheses after this date, which is the date of confirmation of the members by an internal parliamentary vote after approval by the credentials committee. Additionally, during the eighty-seventh session of the parliament on October 23, 1919, a statement was announced regarding several parliament members resigning from the Neutral faction and joining the Musavat and Neutral faction. Although the statement in the petition mentioned the formation of the Musavat and Neutral faction in place of the Musavat faction, the parliamentary records indicate that during this period, the faction operated under the name Musavat and Neutral.

Member	Photo	Fraction (Party)	Election	Start	End	Duty
Abbas Atamalibayov (1895–1971)		Socialist faction Muslim Socialist Bloc	N/A	N/A	9 October 1919 (Note: At the eighty-first session of the Parliament dated October 9, 1919, it was announced that Abbas Bey Atamalibeyov and Arshak Paronyan were expelled from the membership because they did not attend the sessions of the Parliament for more than 15 days without an excuse.)	Member of the development and equipment commission; ~~Member of the Credentials Commission~~; ~~Member of the project commission for Assembly-Institutional elections~~ (Note: The land commission was reorganized at the session of the Parliament on April 24, 1919. Javad bey Malik-Yeganov 36, Heybatgulu Mammadbayov 32, Mahammad Amin Rasulzade 30, Aslan bey Gardashov 28, Aliheydar Garayev 27, Garib Karimoglu 26, and Aleksandr Ter-Azaryan were elected as members of the land commission with 26 votes. The members elected by the proposal of Mahammad Amin Rasulzadeh were also elected members of the workers' commission. Instead of Aslan Bey Gardashov, Mukhtar Efendizade was appointed as a member of the legislative commission by the Ahrar faction. Also, Jamo Bey Hajinski was removed from the project commission for the Assembly-Constituent elections by the faction, and Abbas Bey Atamalibeyov was proposed instead.)
Abbasgulu Kazimzada (1882–1947)		Musavat and neutral faction Musavat	National Council	7 December 1918	27 April 1920 (Note: At the one hundred and forty-fifth urgent and emergency session of the Parliament on April 27, 1920, a decision was made to hand over power to the communists. Although the fate of the parliament is not known in the decision, this was the last session of the parliament.)	~~Member of the development and equipment commission~~
Abdulla bay Afandizadeh (1873–1928)		Ahrar faction	Nukha	15 December 1918	27 April 1920	~~Member of the project commission for Assembly-Institutional elections~~ (Note: In October 1919, the Central Election Commission consisting of 21 members was organized. After the organization of this commission, at the eighty-third session of the parliament on October 13, 1919, the work of the draft commission for the Assembly-Constituent elections was officially terminated.); Member of the "General Amnesty" commission; Member of the finance and budget commission; Member of the Central Election Commission; Member of the special commission to select students to be sent abroad
Abdulla bay Afandizadeh (1873–1928)		Left Independent faction (Note: At the ninety-first session of the Parliament dated November 1, 1919, it was announced that he had left the Ahrar faction chaired by Abdulla Bey Efendizadeh, had not yet joined any faction, and declared himself a left-wing neutral.)	Nukha	15 December 1918	27 April 1920	~~Member of the project commission for Assembly-Institutional elections~~; Member of the "General Amnesty" commission; Member of the finance and budget commission; Member of the Central Election Commission; Member of the special commission to select students to be sent abroad
Abdulla Gabulzada (1853–1943)		Independents faction	Zagatala	15 December (16 January) 1919	16 October 1919 (Note: At the eighty-fourth session of the Parliament dated October 16, 1919, a telegram sent from Zagatala was read regarding Abdulla Gabulzade's resignation due to long-term illness..)	Member of the draft law commission
Abdulla Gabulzada (1853–1943)		Ahrar faction	Zagatala	15 December (16 January) 1919	16 October 1919	Member of the draft law commission
Abgar Papyan (?—?)		Armenian faction	Armenian National Council of Baku	25 February 1919	27 April 1920	Member of the charter commission; Member of the Credentials Commission; Member of the survey commission; ~~Member of the project commission for Assembly-Institutional elections~~; Member of the draft law commission (Note: At the one hundred and forty-third session of the Parliament on April 22, 1920, full-fledged elections were held for the draft law commission. Museyib bey Akhijanov, Asaf bey Shikhalibeyov, Rza bey Aghabeyov, Gara bey Garabeyov, Stanislav Vansevich, Abgar Papyan and Baghir Rzayev were elected members.)
Abgar Papyan (?—?)		Dashnaksutyun faction (Note: At the twenty-ninth session of the Parliament dated April 14, 1919, Dashnaksutyun faction was created and some members of the Armenian faction joined this faction.)	Armenian National Council of Baku	25 February 1919	27 April 1920	Member of the charter commission; Member of the Credentials Commission; Member of the survey commission; ~~Member of the project commission for Assembly-Institutional elections~~; Member of the draft law commission
Abuzar bey Rzayev (1876–1920)		Independents faction	Gandja	15 December 1918	27 April 1920	Chairman of the finance and budget commission; Member of the Workers' Commission; ~~Member of the correctional commission~~ (Note: At the one hundred and twenty-fifth session of the Parliament on February 16, 1920, it was announced that Baghir Rzayev would be elected as a member of the Planning and Supply Commission. Bayram Niyazi Kicichkhanlı resigned from the membership of the Central Election Commission because he went to Zagatala for a month and a half leave. Abuzar bey Rzayev resigned from the revision commission membership because he did not have time. Gazi Ahmad bey Mahammadbayov resigned from the membership of the draft law commission due to lack of time and opportunity. At the end of the meeting, an election was held. Shafi bey Rustambayli to the organization and equipment commission, Hasan bey Aghayev, Mustafa Mahmudov, Aslan bey Safikurdski, Stanislav Vansevich, Isak Khojayev, Gara bey Garabayli and Aslan bey Gardashov to the charter commission. was selected.)
Abuzar bey Rzayev (1876–1920)		Musavat and neutral faction (Note: At the eightieth session of the Parliament on October 2, 1919, it was announced that Abuzar bey Rzayev left the Independents faction and joined the Musavat faction.) Independent politician	Gandja	15 December 1918	27 April 1920	Chairman of the finance and budget commission; Member of the Workers' Commission; ~~Member of the correctional commission~~
Agha Ashurov (1880–1936)		Independents faction	Baku	15 December 1918	27 April 1920	
Agha Ashurov (1880–1936)		Musavat and neutral faction (Note: Musavat and Independents joined the faction, retaining the right to vote, according to the approval announced at the eighty-seventh session of the Parliament on October 23, 1919.) Independent politician	Baku	15 December 1918	27 April 1920	
Agha bey Safaraliyev (?—?)		Ittihad faction	Baku	15 December 1918	27 April 1920	
Agha bey Safaraliyev (?—?)		Non-faction (Note: At the thirty-eighth session of the Parliament dated May 15, 1919, it was announced that Agha Bey Safaraliyev resigned from the Union Party.)	Baku	15 December 1918	27 April 1920	
Agha bey Safaraliyev (?—?)		Independents faction (Note: At the sixty-third session of the Parliament on August 7, 1919, it was announced that Agha Bey Safaraliyev joined the Independents faction.)	Baku	15 December 1918	27 April 1920	
Agha bey Safaraliyev (?—?)		Musavat and neutral faction Independent politician	Baku	15 December 1918	27 April 1920	
Agha Aminov (1888–1921)		Musavat and neutral faction Musavat	Replacement	18 February 1919	27 April 1920	Member of the draft law commission
Agha Zeynal Taghiyev (1893–1940)		Ittihad faction	Baku	15 December 1918	25 February 1919 (Note: At the sixteenth session of the Parliament on February 25, 1919, he was expelled from prison because he did not attend the parliamentary sessions for more than 1 month and did not provide information about it.)	Member of the "General Amnesty" commission
Aleksandr Dubrovski (?—?)		Faction of the Slavic-Russian Society	Slavic-Russian Society (Replacement of Victor Klenevski (Note: At the twenty-sixth session of the Parliament dated April 3, 1919, the information letter about Javad Bey Malik-Yeganov's transfer to the railway service was read and it was announced that Vikto Klenevsky was released from prison due to his transfer to the state service. The faction appointed professor Alexander Dubrovsky as a member instead. At the seventieth session of the Parliament dated September 1919, there was a discussion about the expulsion of Javad Bey Malik-Yeganov, who was on vacation due to his appointment as an extraordinary representative to Lankaran.))	3 April 1919	14 July 1919 (Note: At the fifty-fifth session of the Parliament dated July 14, 1919, the petition for the resignation of Alexander Dubrovsky was read.)	
Aleksandr Kazarov (?—?)		Faction of the Slavic-Russian Society	Russian National Council	18 September 1919	27 April 1920	
Aleksandr Ter-Azaryan (?—?)		Armenian faction	Armenians of Baku and Gandja	25 February (15 may) 1919	27 April 1920	Member of the development and equipment commission; Member of the land commission; Member of the Workers' Committee
Aleksandr Ter-Azaryan (?—?)		Dashnaksutyun faction	Armenians of Baku and Gandja	25 February (15 may) 1919	27 April 1920	Member of the development and equipment commission; Member of the land commission; Member of the Workers' Committee
Arshak Arutunyan (?—?)		Armenian faction	Armenian National Council of Baku	19 October 1919	27 April 1920	
Arshak Malkhazyan (?—?)		Armenian faction	Armenians of Baku and Gandja	25 February (15 May) 1919	27 April 1920	Member of the draft law commission; Member of the land commission; Member of the inspection commission
Arshak Malkhazyan (?—?)		Dashnaksutyun faction	Armenians of Baku and Gandja	25 February (15 May) 1919	27 April 1920	Member of the draft law commission; Member of the land commission; Member of the inspection commission
Arshak Paronyan (?—?)		Armenian faction	Armenian National Council of Baku	25 February 1919	9 October 1919	Member of the finance and budget commission (Note: A letter from the Finance and Budget Commission was read at the 120th session of the Parliament on January 22, 1920. In the letter, it was mentioned that members should be appointed to the vacant seats due to Musa bey Rafiyev and Ahmed bey Pepinov being appointed as ministers, and Mikhail Vinogradov and Arshak Paronyan leaving the membership. The Ahrar faction asked for new members to be elected, saying that [Abdulla Bey Efendizadeh] did not remain a member on behalf of Ahrar in the commissions because he left the faction, but the proposal was not accepted.)
Asaf bay Shikalibayov (1886–?)		Musavat and neutral faction Musavat	National Council	7 December 1918	9 June 1919 (Note: At the forty-eighth session of the Parliament dated June 16, 1919, it was announced that Asaf Bey Shikhalibeyov's resignation, Haji Molla Ahmed Nuruzade's 20-day leave (April 28-May 18), despite the completion of his 20-day leave (April 28-May 18), was expelled from the parliament on June 2, 1919.)	Member of the draft law commission
Asaf bay Shikalibayov (1886–?)		Musavat and neutral faction Musavat	Shemakha uezd	17 July (7 August) 1919	27 April 1920	Member of the draft law commission
Aslan bey Gardashov (1866–1920)		Ahrar faction	National Council	7 December 1918	27 April 1920	Member of the "General Amnesty" commission; ~~Member of the draft law commission~~; Member of the charter commission; Member of the Defense Commission; Member of the commission for good use of the country's products; Member of the finance and budget commission; Member of the Central Election Commission (Note: At the one hundred and twenty-sixth session of the Parliament dated February 19, 1920, Hasan bey Aghayev and Mustafa Mahmudov were elected to the revision commission instead of Abuzar bey Rzayev and Mustafa bey Vakilov. Instead of Gazi Ahmed bey Muhammedbayov, Gara bey Garabayli was elected to the draft law commission. Also, Aslan bey Gardashov was elected instead of Bayram Niyazi Kicichkhanli to the central election commission.); Member of the special commission for monitoring the investigation of Ali Bayramov's murder; Member of the land commission; Member of the Workers' Committee
Aslan bey Safikurdski (1881–1937)		Socialist faction Muslim Socialist Bloc; Xalqçı Partiyası	National Council	7 December 1918	27 April 1920	Member of the charter commission; Member of the "General Amnesty" commission; Member of the Central Election Commission (Note: At the one hundred and nineteenth session of the Parliament dated January 19, 1920, Ahmed bey Pepinov entered the government, so the faction nominated Ibrahim Abilov to the central election commission instead of him. At that meeting Gasim bey Jamalbeyov also resigned from the same commission and nominated Aslan bey Safikurdski instead. Closed, balloon elections were held and both persons were elected commission members.); Member of the draft law commission
Baba bay Gabulzada (1893–1937)		Non-faction	Zagatala (Replacement of Abdulla Gabulzada)	25 December 1919	27 April 1920	
Baba bay Gabulzada (1893–1937)		Ahrar faction (Note: At the one hundred and thirty-third session of the Parliament dated March 11, 1920, it was announced that Garib Karimoglu resigned from membership due to his illness, and that Baba Gabulov and Mashadi Samad Hasanoglu, who were not members of any faction, joined the Ahrar faction.)	Zagatala (Replacement of Abdulla Gabulzada)	25 December 1919	27 April 1920	
Baghir bay Rzayev (1891–1927)		Socialist faction Muslim Socialist Bloc	National Council	7 December (15 December) 1918	28 January 1919	~~Secretary General of the Parliament~~ (Note: At the first session of the Parliament on December 7, 1919, Alimardan bey Topchubashov was elected as the chairman, Hasan bey Aghayev as the deputy chairman, Rahim bey Vakilov as the temporary secretary-general, and Ahmed bey Pepinov as the secretary-general at the second session on December 15, 1919. At the eighth session of the Parliament on January 16, 1919, Bayram Niyazi Kicichkhanli and Mehdi Bey Hajinski were elected deputy general secretaries. At the sixty-third session of the Parliament on August 7, 1919, Sultan Majid Ganizade was elected the second deputy chairman. At the one hundred and eleventh session of the Parliament on December 29, 1919, voting for the chairmanship is held. Alimardan bey Topchubashov is re-elected chairman for a 1-year term. Mammadrza agha Vakilov, who is the oldest among the members, holds the post of temporary chairman. In the elections, Hasan Bey Aghayev is again elected deputy chairman. Mehdi Bey Hajinskii is elected to the post of Secretary General. At the one hundred and sixteenth session of the Parliament dated January 12, 1920, Mehdi Bey Hajinski announced his resignation from the post of Secretary General. At the same meeting, Sultan Majid Ganizadeh was elected the second deputy chairman, Mehdi Bey Hajinski and Bayram Niyazi Kichickhanli were elected to the post of secretary (deputy general secretary). On January 19, 1920, at the one hundred and nineteenth session of the Parliament, elections were held for the position of the general secretary, and Bagir Rzayev, the candidate of the Socialist faction, was elected as the only candidate. Hasan Bey Aghayev announced his resignation at the 120th session of the Parliament on January 22, 1920. Elections were held at the 121st session of the Parliament on February 2, 1920. Mammadrza agha Vakilov was elected temporary chairman In the elections, Mammad Yusif Jafarov was elected chief deputy chairman. Bagir Rzayev resigned from the post of secretary-general at the one hundred and twenty-fifth session of the Parliament on February 16, 1920. At the one hundred and twenty-sixth session of the Parliament on February 19, 1920, Rza Bey Garasharli was elected to the post of secretary general.); Member of the draft law commission; ~~Member of the development and equipment commission~~; Member of the Central Election Commission
Baghir bay Rzayev (1891–1927)		Socialist faction Muslim Socialist Bloc	Mahammad Maharramovun yerinə	15 May 1919	27 April 1920	~~Secretary General of the Parliament~~; Member of the draft law commission; ~~Member of the development and equipment commission~~; Member of the Central Election Commission
Bakhish bay Rustamov (1870–1945)		Independents faction	Javad uezd Salyan Milli Komitəsi	8 January 1919	27 April 1920	Member of the land commission
Bakhish bay Rustamov (1870–1945)		Musavat and neutral faction Independent politician	Javad uezd Salyan Milli Komitəsi	8 January 1919	27 April 1920	Member of the land commission
Bayram Niyazi Kichikkhanli (1889–1922)		Ahrar faction	Zagatala	15 December (16 January) 1919	27 April 1920	Secretary General of the Parliament; Member of the Workers' Commission; ~~Member of the Central Election Commission~~
Behbud Khan Javanshir (1877–1921)		Independents faction	Replacement	18 February 1919	27 April 1920	Member of the charter commission; Member of the Defense Commission (Note: At the twenty-fourth Khosrov bey Sultanov session of the Parliament dated March 17, 1919, Khosrov bey Sultanov was removed from the commission, and Behbud Khan Javanshir was accepted as a member of the commission instead.)
Bahram bay Akhundov (1861–1932)		Independents faction	Replacement	18 February 1919	27 April 1920	Member of the Credentials Commission; Member of the special commission for monitoring the investigation of Ali Bayramov's murder
Bahram bey Vazirov (1857–1921)		Ittihad faction	Jabrayil uezd	15 December 1918	27 April 1920	
Bogdan Balayans (?—?)		Armenian faction	Armenians of Nukha and Aghdash	5 May 1919	27 April 1920	
Bogdan Balayans (?—?)		Dashnaksutyun faction	Armenians of Nukha and Aghdash	5 May 1919	27 April 1920	
Jamo bey Hajinski (1888–1942)		Socialist faction Muslim Socialist Bloc; Xalqçı Partiyası	National Council	7 December 1918	27 April 1920	Tərtibat və ləvazim komissiyasının sədri; ~~Member of the project commission for Assembly-Institutional elections~~; Member of the Defense Commission
Javad bey Malik-Yeganov (1878–1937)		Musavat and neutral faction Musavat	National Council	7 December 1918	3 April 1919	Member of the land commission; Member of the Workers' Committee
Jalil bay Sultanov (?—?)		Non-faction	Zangazur uezd	17 March 1919	23 may (9 June) 1919 (Note: At the forty-sixth session of the Parliament dated June 9, 1919, it was announced that Jalil Bey Sultanov was expelled from membership on May 23 because he did not participate in the sessions since May 8.)	Member of the land commission
Jalil bay Sultanov (?—?)		Independents faction (Note: At the twenty-fifth session of the Parliament dated March 20, 1919, Jalil Bey Sultanbeyov's information about joining the Independents faction was announced.)	Zangazur uezd	9 October (10 November) 1919	27 April 1920	Member of the land commission
Jalil bay Sultanov (?—?)		Musavat and neutral faction (Note: At the thirty-sixth session of the Parliament on May 12, 1919, it was announced that Jalil Bey Sultanov had left the Independents faction and joined the Musavat Party.) Musavat	Zangazur uezd	9 October (10 November) 1919	27 April 1920	Member of the land commission
Javad bey Malik-Yeganov (1884–1959)		Independents faction	Javanshir uezd	8 January 1919	4 (18) February 1919 (Note: At the twelfth session of the Parliament dated February 4, 1919, it was announced that the head of the seminary, Firudin Bey Kocharli, and the Deputy Minister of Justice, Teymur Bey Makinsky, resigned from membership. It was also announced that Baku governor Museyib bey Akhijanov, Jamil bey Lambaranski, Aliagha Hasanov, Sadykh bey Aghabeyov, Mammad Yusif Jafarov, Hamid bey Shahtakhtinski were expelled from the parliament due to the "human-social" law. Ibrahim agha Vakilov resigned from membership at the thirteenth session of the parliament on February 5, 1919, remaining in his position according to the "human-social" law.)	
Javad bey Malik-Yeganov (1884–1959)		Independents faction	Javanshir uezd	21 July 1919	27 April 1920	
Javad bey Malik-Yeganov (1884–1959)		Non-faction (Note: At the seventieth session of the Parliament dated September 1919, it was announced that Javad Bey Malik-Yeganov left the Independents faction and did not join any faction.)	Javanshir uezd	21 July 1919	27 April 1920	
Javad bey Malik-Yeganov (1884–1959)		Ittihad faction (Note: At the eighty-fifth session of the Parliament on October 18, 1919, it was announced that Iskander bey Akhundov left the Independents faction and joined the Ittihad faction together with Javad bey Malik-Yeganov.)	Javanshir uezd	21 July 1919	27 April 1920	
Abdulali bey Amirjanov (1870–1948)		Independents faction	Replacement	18 February 1919	27 April 1920	Member of the finance and budget commission
Ahmet Ağaoğlu (1869–1939)		Independents faction	Zangazur uezd	26 December 1918	19 January 1919 (Note: At the eighth session of the Parliament on January 16, 1919, the power of attorney commission wanted to vote on the confirmation of the correctness of the documents and full approval of the admission to membership, but Ahmed bey Aghayev had already refused membership.)	
Ahmed bey Pepinov (1893–1938)		Socialist faction Hummet	National Council	7 December 1918	27 April 1920	~~Secretary General of the Parliament~~; Member of the draft law commission; ~~Member of the finance and budget commission~~; ~~Member of the Central Election Commission~~; Member of the special commission for monitoring the investigation of Ali Bayramov's murder; Member of the special commission to select students to be sent abroad
Ahmad Hamdi Garaaghazade (?–?)		Musavat and neutral faction Musavat	N/A.	N/A	N/A	Member of the land commission
Akbar agha Sheykhulislamov (1891–1961)		Socialist faction Hummet	National Council	7 December 1918	27 April 1920	Member of the charter commission
Ali Asgar bay Mahmudbayov (1875–1968)		Musavat and neutral faction Musavat	National Council	7 December 1918	26 December 1918 (Note: At the fifth session of the Parliament on December 26, 1918, it was announced that he had resigned from office due to certain reasons. Musa bey Rafiyev was elected as a member instead.)	
Ali bay Zizikski (1876–1929)		Ittihad faction	Bakı vilayəti Guba uezd	15 December 1918	27 April 1920	Member of the finance and budget commission
Aliagha Hasanov (1871–1933)		Independents faction	Bakı	15 December 1918	4 February 1919	Member of the finance and budget commission
Aliheydar Garayev (1896–1938)		Socialist faction Hummet	N/A.	7 December 1918	27 April 1920	Member of the Credentials Commission; Member of the draft law commission; Member of the land commission; Member of the Workers' Committee
Alimardan bey Topchubashov (1862–1934)		Non-faction	National Council	7 December 1918	27 April 1920	Parlamentin rəisi
Asad bey Amirov (1889–1939)		Ittihad faction	Bakı	24 April 1919	27 April 1920	
Asadulla Ahmadov (1867–1941)		Independents faction	Bakı	24 April 1919	27 April 1920	Member of the inspection commission
Asadulla Ahmadov (1867–1941)		Musavat and neutral faction Independent politician	Bakı	24 April 1919	27 April 1920	Member of the inspection commission
Ashraf bay Taghiyev (1867–1930)		Ahrar faction	Arash	15 December 1918	N/A.	
Ashraf bay Taghiyev (1867–1930)		Musavat and neutral faction (Note: At the ninety-third session of the Parliament on November 3, 1919, it was announced that Ashraf Bey Taghiyev left the Ahrar faction and joined the Musavat and Independents factions.) Musavat	Arash	17 March 1919	27 April 1920	
Fatali Khan Khoyski (1875–1920)		Independents faction	National Council	7 December 1918	27 April 1920	
Fatali Khan Khoyski (1875–1920)		Non-faction (Note: At the forty-ninth session of the Parliament on June 19, 1919, he announced that he did not join any faction and remained alone.)	National Council	7 December 1918	27 April 1920	
Fatali Khan Khoyski (1875–1920)		Musavat and neutral faction Independent politician	National Council	7 December 1918	27 April 1920	
Firidun bey Kocharli (1863–1920)		Musavat and neutral faction Musavat	National Council	7 December 1918	4 February 1919	
Fyodr Kotilevsky (?—?)		Faction of the Slavic-Russian Society	Slavic-Russian Society	15 December 1919	27 April 1920	Member of the draft law commission (Note: At the eighty-second session of the Parliament dated October 11, 1919, Sergey Remizov resigned from the law draft commission and Zakharov was accepted as a member of the commission instead, Sergey Mikhailov resigned from the power of attorney commission and Sergey Remizov was accepted as a member of the commission instead, It was announced that Stepan Tagianosov resigned from the financial commission and Yervand Tagianosov was accepted as a member of the commission.)
Haji Ali Gasimoghlu (?—?)		Ahrar faction	Gandja	15 December 1918	5 May (26 May) 1919 (Note: At the thirty-third session of the Parliament on May 5, 1919 and at the forty-first session on May 26, 1919, Haji Ali Gasımoğlu was expelled from prison because he did not attend the meetings for 1 month and did not report the reason.)	
Haji Ali Gasimoghlu (?—?)		Ahrar faction	Gandja	21 July 1919	9 October (5 January) 1919 (Note: Haji Ali Gasimoglu and Haji Molla Ahmet Nuruzadeh were expelled from the parliament on October 2, 1919, as they had passed 15 days of leave and did not report at the eighty-fifth session of the parliament on October 18, 1919. Although Abdulla Bey Efendizade protested against this decision, he managed to change the export date to October 9.) (Note: At the one hundred and fourteenth session of the Parliament dated January 5, 1920, Haji Ali Gasim oglu's letter announcing his resignation due to family reasons was announced.)	
Haji Huseyn Afandiyev (1887–1920)		Ahrar faction	Goychay	15 December 1918	9 November 1919 (Note: At the ninety-fifth session of the Parliament on November 9, 1919, it was announced that Haji Huseyn Efendiyev was released from membership because he did not participate in the sessions for more than 2 weeks without an excuse. So, his time expired on October 22.)	Member of the Credentials Commission; Member of the finance and budget commission (Note: Announcing that it is difficult to work simultaneously in three commissions, instead, Mukhtar Afandizade has resigned from the finance commission with the condition of admitting Haji Huseyn Afandiyev as a member.)
Haji Huseyn Afandiyev (1887–1920)		Ahrar faction	Goychay	24 November 1919 (Note: The membership of Haji Huseyn Efendiyev, who was mistakenly expelled from the membership due to a problem with the documents, was restored at the hundredth session of the Parliament on November 24, 1919.)	27 April 1920	Member of the Credentials Commission; Member of the finance and budget commission
Haji Karim Sanili (1878–1937)		Socialist faction Hummet	Qazakh	15 December 1918	27 April 1920	Member of the land commission; Member of the survey commission
Haji Molla Ahmad Nuruzade (1881–1930)		Ahrar faction	Gəncə qəzası	15 December 1918	2 June 1919	Member of the development and equipment commission; Member of the finance and budget commission
Haji Molla Ahmad Nuruzade (1881–1930)		Ahrar faction	Gəncə qəzası	21 July 1919	9 October 1919	Member of the development and equipment commission; Member of the finance and budget commission
Mirza Salim Akhundzada (1872–1930)		Musavat and neutral faction Musavat	National Council	7 December 1918	27 April 1920	
Heybatgulu Mammadbayov (1879–1937)		Ittihad faction	National Council	7 December 1918	27 April 1920	Member of the development and equipment commission; Member of the draft law commission; Member of the land commission; Member of the Workers' Committee
Hamdulla Afandi Afandizadeh (1870–1929)		Ittihad faction	Baku, Quba	15 December 1918	27 April 1920	
Hamid bey Shahtakhtinski (1880–1944)		Musavat and neutral faction Musavat	National Council	7 December 1918	4 February 1919	
Hasan bey Aghayev (1875–1920)		Musavat and neutral faction Musavat	National Council	7 December 1918	27 April 1920	~~Parlament sədrinin baş müavini~~; Member of the finance and budget commission (Note: At the one hundred and twenty-third session of the Parliament dated February 9, 1920, Hasan bey Aghayev was elected a member with 33 votes instead of Mustafa bey Vakilov, who resigned from the finance and budget commission. announced.); Member of the charter commission; Member of the correctional commission
Khalil bey Khasmammadov (1873–1947)		Musavat and neutral faction Musavat	National Council	7 December 1918	27 April 1920	
Khoren Amaspur (?—?)		Armenian faction	Armenians of Baku and Gandja	25 February (15 may) 1919	27 April 1920	Member of the development and equipment commission
Khoren Amaspur (?—?)		Dashnaksutyun faction	Armenians of Baku and Gandja	25 February (15 may) 1919	27 April 1920	Member of the development and equipment commission
Khosrov bey Sultanov (1879–1943)		Musavat and neutral faction Independent politician	National Council	7 December 1918	15 January 1919	Member of the draft law commission; ~~Member of the Defense Commission~~
Khudadat bey Malik-Aslanov (1879–1935)		Non-faction	National Council	7 December 1918	27 April 1920	
Ibrahim agha Vakilov (1853–1934)		Musavat and neutral faction Musavat	National Council	7 December 1918	5 February 1919	
Ibrahim Abilov (1881–1923)		Socialist faction Hummet	National Council	7 December 1918	N/A.	Member of the Central Election Commission; Member of the land commission; Member of the survey commission
Ibrahim Abilov (1881–1923)		Socialist faction Hummet	Replacement	28 January 1919	27 April 1920	Member of the Central Election Commission; Member of the land commission; Member of the survey commission
Ibrahim Ismayilzade (?-?)		Socialist faction Muslim Socialist Bloc; Xalqçı Partiyası	Replacement	22 December 1919	27 April 1920	
Ignatyev (?—?)		Faction of the Slavic-Russian Society	Slavic-Russian Society	18 sentaybr 1919	27 April 1920	
Ilya Janin (?—?)		Faction of the Slavic-Russian Society	Russians of Mughan	19 February 1920	27 April 1920	
Ishak Khojayev (?—?)		Armenian faction	Armenians of Baku and Gandja	25 February (15 may) 1919	27 April 1920	Member of the charter commission; Member of the commission investigating the Karabakh events
Isgandar bay Akhundov (1862–1933)		Independents faction	Shamakhu	September (18 September) 1919	27 April 1920	
Isgandar bay Akhundov (1862–1933)		Ittihad faction	Shamakhu	September (18 September) 1919	27 April 1920	
Islam bay Gabulzade (1879–1920)		Musavat and neutral faction Musavat	National Council	7 December 1918	27 April 1920	Member of the draft law commission
Gara bay Aliverdilar (1879–1929)		Ittihad faction	Shusha uezd Ağdam	15 December 1918	27 April 1920	
Gara bay Garabayov (1874–1953)		Ittihad faction	Baku	7 December (15 December) 1918	27 April 1920	Member of the draft law commission; Member of the Defense Commission; Member of the Central Election Commission; Member of the charter commission; Member of the special commission to select students to be sent abroad; Member of the commission investigating the Karabakh events
Gasim bay Jamalbayov (1881–1938)		Socialist faction Hummet	National Council	7 December 1918	26 May 1919 (Note: At the forty-first session of the Parliament on May 26, 1919, he was expelled from prison because he did not participate in the meetings and did not provide information for 2 weeks.)	Member of the development and equipment commission; Member of the draft law commission; ~~Member of the Central Election Commission~~
Gasim bay Jamalbayov (1881–1938)		Socialist faction Hummet	Hummet	17 July 1919 (Note: At the fifty-sixth session of the Parliament on July 17, 1919, the proposal to nominate Gasim Bey Jamalbeyov, who was expelled from exile, for membership by Hummet was announced and accepted.)	27 April 1920	Member of the development and equipment commission; Member of the draft law commission; ~~Member of the Central Election Commission~~
Gazi Ahmad bay Mahammadbayov (1889–1937)		Musavat and neutral faction Musavat	National Council	7 December 1918	27 April 1920	~~Member of the project commission for Assembly-Institutional elections~~; Member of the draft law commission; ~~Member of the Central Election Commission~~; Member of the special commission for monitoring the investigation of Ali Bayramov's murder
Gazi Ahmad bay Mahammadbayov (1889–1937)		Ittihad faction	National Council	7 December 1918	27 April 1920	~~Member of the project commission for Assembly-Institutional elections~~; Member of the draft law commission; ~~Member of the Central Election Commission~~; Member of the special commission for monitoring the investigation of Ali Bayramov's murder
Garib Karimoghlu (1870–1926)		Ahrar faction	Nukha	15 December 1918	11 March 1920	Member of the land commission; Member of the Workers' Committee
Grigory Skhakaya (?—?)		National minority faction	Georgian National Council	15 December 1918	2 June 1919 (Note: Məbusluqdan istefa verdi.)	Member of the development and equipment commission; Member of the Workers' Commission; Member of the commission for good use of the country's products; Member of the correctional commission
Gulamhuseyn bay Kazimbayov (1889–1972)		Non-faction	Lankaran	11 December 1919	27 April 1920	
Gulamhuseyn bay Kazimbayov (1889–1972)		Musavat and neutral faction (Note: At the one hundred and ninth session of the Parliament dated December 22, 1919, it was announced that Gulamhuseyn bey Kazymbeyov was a member of the Musavat and Independents factions.) Musavat	Lankaran	11 December 1919	27 April 1920	
Lawrence Kun (1884–1942)		National minority faction	German National Council	15 December 1918	27 April 1920	Member of the land commission; Member of the draft law commission
Lujov (?—?)		Faction of the Slavic-Russian Society	Slavic-Russian Society (Victor Klenevskinin replaced)	N/A.	27 April 1920	
Mehdi bay Hajibababayov (1871–1925)		Musavat and neutral faction Musavat	National Council	7 December 1918	27 April 1920	
Mehdi bey Hajinski (1879–1941)		Musavat and neutral faction Musavat	National Council	7 December 1918	27 April 1920	~~Secretary General of the Parliament~~; Secretary General of the Parliamentnin müavini; ~~Member of the draft law commission~~; Member of the special commission to select students to be sent abroad
'Mahammad Ali Rasulzade (1882–1982)		Musavat and neutral faction Musavat	Replacement	18 February 1919	27 April 1920	
Mahammad Amin Rasulzade (1884–1955)		Musavat and neutral faction Musavat	National Council	7 December 1918	27 April 1920	~~Chairman of the project commission for Assembly-Institutional elections~~; Member of the draft law commission; Member of the correctional commission; Member of the special commission to select students to be sent abroad; Member of the land commission; Member of the Workers' Committee
Mahammad Maharramov (1895–1982)		Socialist faction Muslim Socialist Bloc	National Council	7 December 1918	8 May 1919 (Note: Parlamentin 8 may 1919 tarixli sayca otuz beşinci iclasına Mahammad Maharramovun istefası elan olundu. Onun əvəzinə fraksiyadan Bağır bəy Rzayev üzvlüyə seçildi.)	Member of the Mandate Commission; Member of the finance and budget commission
Mammad Yusif Jafarov (1885–1935)		Musavat and neutral faction Independent politician	National Council	7 December 1918	18 February 1919 (Note: At the fifteenth session of the Parliament dated February 18, 1919, a letter was read in which Mammad Yusif Jafarov requested to remain both in the membership and as an expert as the ambassador of Azerbaijan in Tbilisi, but with the protest of Mahammad Amin Rasulzade and the unanimous decision of the prisoners, Jafarov was expelled from the membership)	Member of the charter commission
Mammad Yusif Jafarov (1885–1935)		Musavat and neutral faction Independent politician	Yusifali Aliyev (Note: At the ninety-third session of the Parliament on November 6, 1919, Yusifali Aliyev resigned as a deputy minister of trade and food, and Mammad Yusif Jafarov was accepted as a member instead. Mikhail Vinogradov was expelled from the parliament on October 18, as he did not attend the meetings since October 13 without an excuse.)	6 November 1919	27 April 1920	Chief Deputy Speaker of the Parliament
Mammadbaghir Sheykhzamanli (1880–1920)		Musavat and neutral faction Musavat	Replacement	18 February 1919	27 April 1920	Member of the land commission
Mammad Hasan Hajinski (1875–1931)		Musavat and neutral faction Musavat	National Council	7 December 1918	27 April 1920	
Mammadrza agha Vakilov (1864–1944)		N/A.	National Council	7 December 1918	27 April 1920	~~Acting Chairman~~; Member of the inspection commission
Mammadrza agha Vakilov (1864–1944)		Musavat and neutral faction (Note: At the twenty-first session of the Parliament dated March 10, 1919, it was announced that Dr. Mammadrza agha Vakilov joined the Musavat Party and automatically entered the Musavat and Independents faction.) Musavat	National Council	7 December 1918	27 April 1920	~~Acting Chairman~~; Member of the inspection commission
Mashadi Samad Hasanoghlu (1885–?)		Non-faction	Gandja	19 February 1920	27 April 1920	
Mashadi Samad Hasanoghlu (1885–?)		Ahrar faction	Gandja	19 February 1920	27 April 1920	
Mikhail Vinogradov (?—?)		Faction of the Slavic-Russian Society	Slavic-Russian Society	15 December (8 January) 1918	28 October 1919	Member of the draft law commission; Member of the commission for good use of the country's products; Member of the finance and budget commission
Mir Hidayat bey Seyidov (1887–1919)		Musavat and neutral faction Musavat	National Council	7 December 1918	5 February 1919 (Note: Ashraf bey Taghiyev and Mir Hidayat bey Seyidov were deported from prison because they did not attend the parliament sessions for more than two months at the thirteenth session of the parliament dated February 5, 1919. Mir Hidayat Bey Seyidov died on February 23, 1919.)	
Mir Yaqub Mehdiyev (1891–1949)		Ittihad faction	National Council	7 December 1918	27 April 1920	Member of the finance and budget commission
Mirza Jalal Yusifzade (1862–1931)		Musavat and neutral faction Musavat	National Council	7 December 1918	27 April 1920	
Mirza Asadullayev (1875–1936)		Independents faction	Baku Oil Miners Union Congress	15 December 1918	27 April 1920	
Mirza Asadullayev (1875–1936)		Musavat and neutral faction Independent politician	Baku Oil Miners Union Congress	15 December 1918	27 April 1920	
Mammad Sadug Aran (1895–1971)		Musavat and neutral faction Musavat	Zangezur uezd	9 October (10 November) 1919	27 April 1920	
Moisey Gukhman (?—?)		National minority faction	Jewish National Council	15 December 1918	27 April 1920	Member of the Credentials Commission; Member of the finance and budget commission
Mukhtar Afandizade (1880–1975)		Ahrar faction	Arash uezd	17 March 1919	27 April 1920	Member of the correctional commission; Qanun layihəsi komissiyasınınun üzvü; ~~Member of the finance and budget commission~~
Murtuza Akhundzade (1877–1920)		Musavat and neutral faction Musavat	Baku; Guba	15 December 1918	27 April 1920	
Musa bey Rafiyev (1888–1938)		Musavat and neutral faction Musavat	Replacement of Ali Asgər bay Mahmudbayov (National Council) (Note: Although some sources indicate that the members of the National Council are 44 people (in the composition indicated above), it is known from other sources that Musa bey Rafiyev and Nariman bey Narimanbeyov are also members of the National Council.)	26 December 1918	27 April 1920	Deputy chairman of the defense commission; ~~Member of the finance and budget commission~~
Mustafa Mahmudov (1878–1937)		Musavat and neutral faction Musavat	National Council	7 December 1918	27 April 1920	Member of the charter commission; Member of the correctional commission
Mustafa bey Vakilov (1896–1865)		Musavat and neutral faction Musavat	Replacement	18 February 1919	27 April 1920	~~Member of the correctional commission~~; ~~Member of the finance and budget commission~~
Museyib bey Akhijanov (1892–1920)		Musavat and neutral faction Musavat	National Council	7 December 1918	4 February 1919	Member of the draft law commission
Museyib bey Akhijanov (1892–1920)		Musavat and neutral faction Musavat	Javad uezd	27 September 1919	27 April 1920	Member of the draft law commission
Nariman bey Narimanbeyov (1889–1937)		Musavat and neutral faction Musavat	National Council	7 December 1918	27 April 1920	~~Member of the finance and budget commission~~ (Note: At the thirty-seventh session of the Parliament dated May 13, 1919, Rza bey Agabayov was proposed to be a member of the financial commission instead of Nariman bey Narimanbeyov.); Member of the land commission; Member of the inspection commission
Nasib bey Yusifbeyli (1881–1920)		Musavat and neutral faction Musavat	National Council	7 December 1918	27 April 1920	
Pogos Chubaryan (?—?)		Armenian faction	Armenian National Council of Baku	25 February 1919	27 April 1920	Member of the finance and budget commission; Member of the commission investigating the Karabakh events
Pogos Chubaryan (?—?)		Dashnaksutyun faction	Armenian National Council of Baku	25 February 1919	27 April 1920	Member of the finance and budget commission; Member of the commission investigating the Karabakh events
Rahim bay Vakilov (1898–1934)		Musavat and neutral faction Musavat	National Council	7 December 1918	27 April 1920	~~Acting Secretary General of the Parliament~~
Rashid bey Akhundzadeh (1880–1940)		Musavat and neutral faction Musavat	Salyan	8 January 1919	27 April 1920	
Rza bay Aghabayov (?—?)		Musavat and neutral faction Musavat	Goychay	7 April 1919	27 April 1920	Member of the finance and budget commission; Member of the inspection commission
Rza bay Garasharly (1891–?)		Socialist faction Muslim Socialist Bloc; People Party	N/A.	7 December 1918	27 April 1920	Secretary General of the Parliament; Member of the correctional commission; Member of the Central Election Commission
Sadıg bay Aghabayzada (1865–1944)		Ittihad faction	Goychay	15 December 1918	4 February 1919	
Sergey Mikhaylov (?—?)		Faction of the Slavic-Russian Society	Slavic-Russian Society	15 December (8 January) 1918	2 October 1919 (Note: At the eightieth session of the Parliament on October 2, 1919, it was announced that Sergey Mikhailov had resigned from the post due to some reasons.)	~~Member of the Credentials Commission~~
Sergey Remizov (?—?)		Faction of the Slavic-Russian Society	Russian National Council	18 September 1919	27 April 1920	~~Member of the draft law commission~~; Member of the Credentials Commission
Samad aga Agamalioglu (1867–1930)		Socialist faction Hummet	National Council	7 December 1918	27 April 1920	Chairman of the land commission; Member of the "General Amnesty" commission; Member of the finance and budget commission
Samad bey Mehmandarov (1856–1931)		Non-faction	Lankaran	18 October (10 November) 1919	27 April 1920	
Stanislav Vonsovich (1888–1937)		National minority faction	Polish of Baku	15 December 1918	27 April 1920	Member of the charter commission; ~~Member of the project commission for Assembly-Institutional elections~~; Member of the draft law commission
Stepan Tagianosov (?—?)		Armenian faction	Armenian National Council of Baku	25 February 1919	27 April 1920	~~Member of the finance and budget commission~~
Stepan Shahnazarov (?—?)		Armenian faction	Armenian National Council of Baku	25 February 1919	27 April 1920	
Strevutin (?—?)		Faction of the Slavic-Russian Society	Slavic-Russian Society (Replacement of Victor Klenevski)	26 February 1920	27 April 1920	
Sultan Majid Ganizade (1866–1938)		Ittihad faction	National Council	7 December 1918	27 April 1920	Second Deputy Speaker of the Parliament
Shagen Shahnazarov (?—?)		Armenian faction	Gandja Armenian National Council (Nukha)	25 December 1919	27 April 1920	
Shafi bay Rustambayli (1893–1960)		Musavat and neutral faction Musavat	National Council	7 December 1918	27 April 1920	Chairman of the Credentials Commission; Member of the development and equipment commission; Member of the commission investigating the Karabakh events
Teymur bey Makinsky (1874–?)		Independents faction	National Council	7 December 1919	4 February 1919	~~Member of the project commission for Assembly-Institutional elections~~
Vasily Kravchenko (?—?)		Faction of the Slavic-Russian Society	Slavic-Russian Society	15 December (8 January) 1918	27 April 1920	Member of the development and equipment commission
Vasili Kujim (?—?)		National minority faction	Rada of Ukrainians of Baku	4 February 1919	27 April 1920	Member of the draft law commission
Victor Klenevski (1883—?)		Faction of the Slavic-Russian Society	Slavic-Russian Society	15 December (8 January) 1918	3 April 1919	Member of the charter commission
Victor Klenevski (1883—?)		Faction of the Slavic-Russian Society	Slavic-Russian Society (Replacement of Sergey Mikhaylov)	16 October 1919	26 February 1920	
Vladimir Bakradze (?-?)		Non-faction	Georgian National Council (Replaced with Grigori Skhakaya)	2 July 1919 (Note: At the forty-fourth session of the Parliament dated July 2, 1919, it was announced that a letter was received from the Georgian National Council regarding the decision of May 25 to appoint Vladimir Bakradze as a member instead of Grigori Shakaya.)	27 April 1920	Member of the Workers' Commission; Member of the draft law commission; Member of the Credentials Commission
Vladimir Bakradze (?-?)		Socialist faction (Note: At the forty-eighth session of the Parliament on June 16, 1919, it was announced that he joined the Socialist faction.)	Georgian National Council (Replaced with Grigori Skhakaya)	2 July 1919	27 April 1920	Member of the Workers' Commission; Member of the draft law commission; Member of the Credentials Commission
Vladimir Ollongren (1867–1943)		Faction of the Slavic-Russian Society	Slavic-Russian Society	15 December (8 January) 1918	27 April 1920	
Vladimir Ollongren (1867–1943)		National minority faction	Slavic-Russian Society	15 December (8 January) 1918	27 April 1920	
Yervand Fadaeviç Taqianosov (?—?)		Armenian faction	Armenian National Council of Baku	25 February 1919	27 April 1920	~~Member of the project commission for Assembly-Institutional elections~~; Member of the survey commission; Member of the finance and budget commission
Yervand Fadaeviç Taqianosov (?—?)		Dashnaksutyun faction	Armenian National Council of Baku	25 February 1919	27 April 1920	~~Member of the project commission for Assembly-Institutional elections~~; Member of the survey commission; Member of the finance and budget commission
Yusif Əhmədzadə (?–1938)		Independents faction	National Council (Bakı Ticarət və Sənayə İttifaqı)	7 December (15 December)1919	27 April 1920	Member of the commission for good use of the country's products
Yusif Əhmədzadə (?–1938)		Musavat and neutral faction Independent politician	National Council (Bakı Ticarət və Sənayə İttifaqı)	7 December (15 December)1919	27 April 1920	Member of the commission for good use of the country's products
Yusifəli Əliyev (?—?)		Musavat and neutral faction Musavat	Replacement	18 February 1919	6 November 1919	Member of the commission for good use of the country's products
Zaxarov (?—?)		Slavic-Russian Society fraction	Slavic-Russian Society	18 September 1919	27 April 1920	Member of the draft law commission
Zeynal bey Vazirov (1854–1933)		Ittihad faction	Shusha uezd	15 December (16 January) 1919	27 April 1920	Member of the Credentials Commission; Member of the commission for good use of the country's products
