= Museyib bey Akhijanov =

Azerbaijani political leader

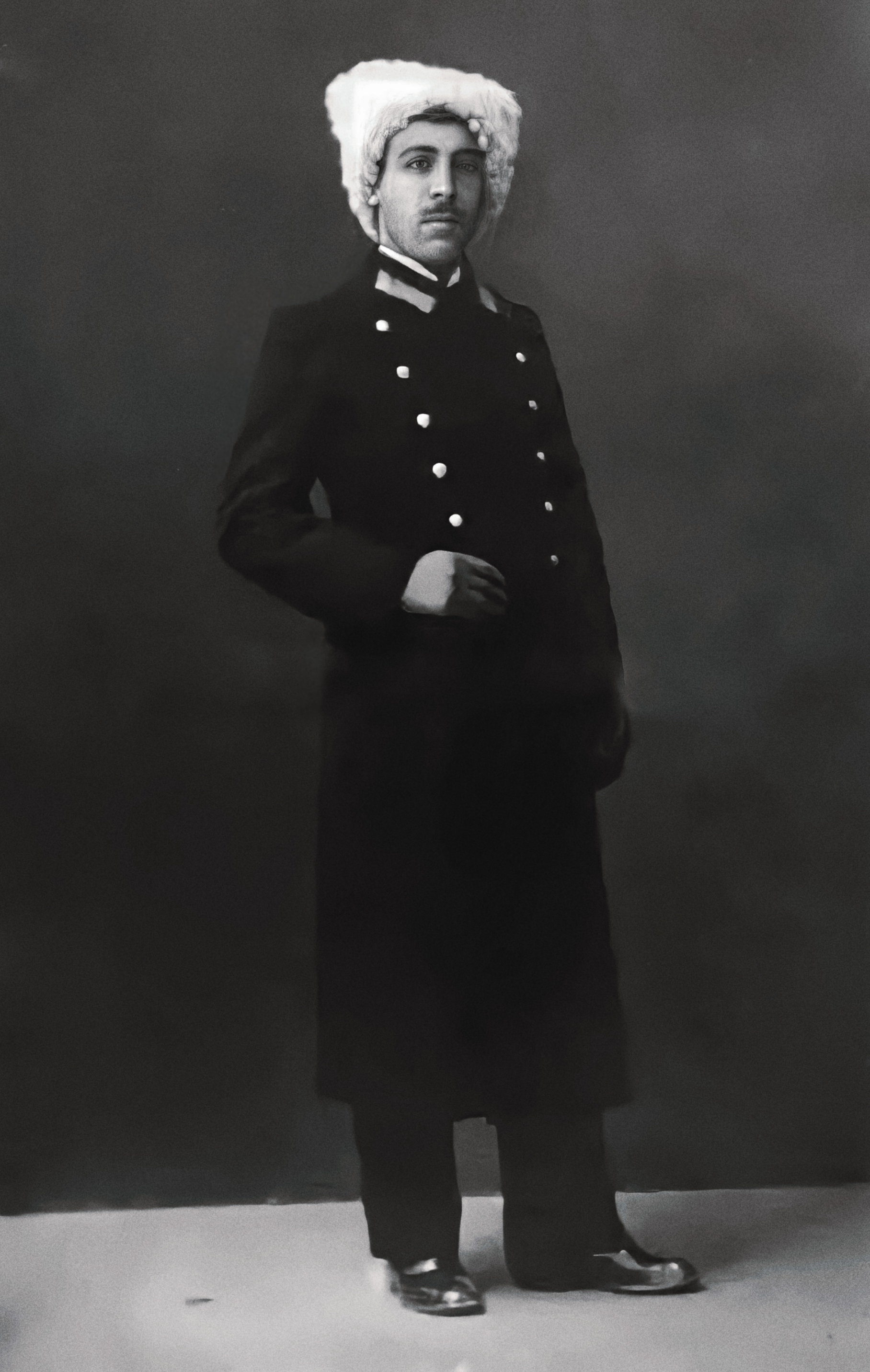

Member of the Parliament of the Azerbaijan Democratic Republic
- In office September 27, 1919 – April 27, 1920
- Preceded by: office established
- Succeeded by: office abolished
- In office December 7, 1919 – February 4, 1919
- Preceded by: office established
- Succeeded by: office abolished

Baku Governorate Governor
- In office 1918 – February 5, 1919
- Preceded by: Mahammad Fathi bay
- Succeeded by: Rashid bey Akhundzadeh

Assistant to the Governor of the Baku Governorate
- In office 1918–1918

Azerbaijani National Council
- In office May 27, 1918 – December 7, 1918
- Preceded by: office established
- Succeeded by: office abolished

Member of the Transcaucasian Sejm
- In office February 23, 1918 – May 26, 1918
- Preceded by: office established
- Succeeded by: office abolished

Museyib Bey Akhijanov, also known as Akhijanov or Akhijanli (Azerbaijani: Müseyib Bey Qəhrəman bəy oğlu Əxicanov) was a member of the Azerbaijani National Council, the Parliament of the Azerbaijan Democratic Republic, and the Transcaucasian Sejm, as well as the governor of the city of Baku.

== Life ==
Akhijanov, Museyib Bey Gahraman bey oglu, was born in 1892 in the village of Tomarkhanli in the Javad uezd. He graduated from the law faculty of the Kiev Saint Vladimir University in 1912. From February 23 to May 26, 1918, he was a member of the Muslim faction in the Transcaucasian Sejm. After the dissolution of the Transcaucasian Democratic Federative Republic, he became a member of the Azerbaijani National Council. Following the National Council's law of November 19, 1918, on the establishment of the Azerbaijan Republic Parliament, he was included in the parliament. He was a member of the "Müsavat" and neutrals faction.

Following the liberation of Baku on September 15, 1918, he became the deputy of Fathi Bey, the governor of Baku. Later, from November 1918 to February 5, 1919, he served as the governor of Baku.

After the April Occupation, he was arrested and executed by firing squad on June 6, 1920, on Nargin Island.

== Legacy ==
Mahammad Amin Rasulzade referred to Museyib Bey Akhijanov as a martyr of Azerbaijan's independence in his 1923 book "The Quality, Formation, and Current State of the Azerbaijan Republic."
