= Rafibeyli =

Rafibeyli (Azerbaijani: Rəfibəyli) is an Azerbaijani surname.

People bearing this surname include:

- Nigar Rafibeyli - was Azerbaijani writer and the Chairman of the Writers' Union of Azerbaijan
- Khudadat Rafibeyli - Minister of Healthcare of ADR, Governor General of Ganja Governorate of Azerbaijan Democratic Republic and member of Azerbaijani National Council
- Musa Rafibeyli - Minister of Social Security and Healthcare within the fourth cabinet of Azerbaijan Democratic Republic, member of Azerbaijani Parliament
