= Fourth cabinet of the Azerbaijan Democratic Republic =

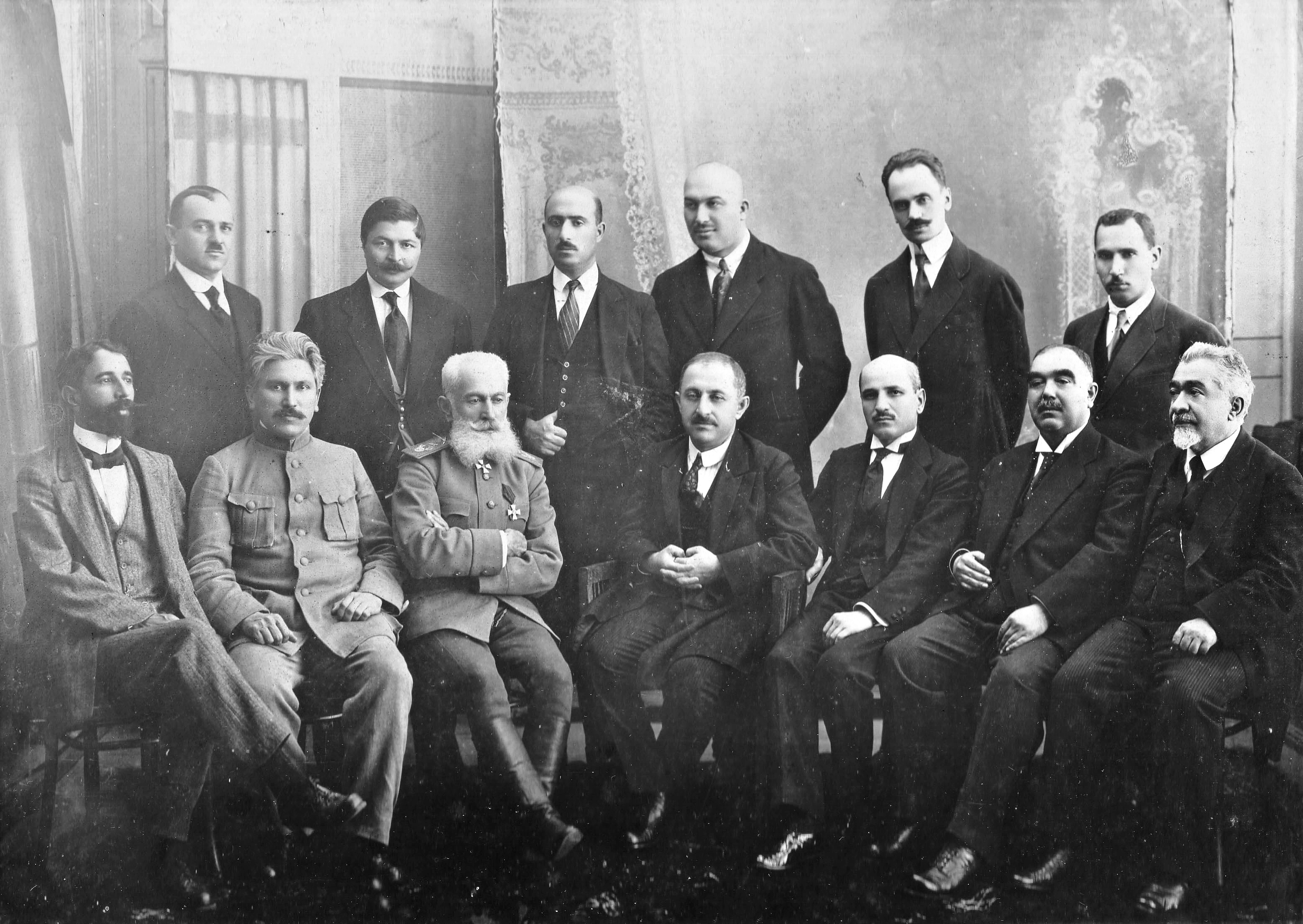
Cabinet of Ministers of the Republic of Azerbaidzhan of the IV government. From left to right: Sitting: A. Safikyurdsky, H. Melik-Aslanov, S. Mekhmandarov, N. Usubbekov, M.Yu. Jafarov, A. Hasanov and A. N. Dastakyan; Standing: X. Amaspur, R.Z. Kaplanov, A. Aminov, M. J. Gajinsky, V.V. Klenovsky, N. Narimanbekov.

The fourth cabinet of Azerbaijan Democratic Republic governed the Azerbaijan Democratic Republic (ADR) between 14 April 1919 and 22 December 1919. The chairman of the government, N. Usubbayov, presented the fourth cabinet of the Azerbaijan Democratic Republic during the 29th session of parliament, following extended deliberations. It was formed after the third cabinet of the Azerbaijan Democratic Republic dissolved on March 14, 1919, and was led by Prime Minister of Azerbaijan Nasib Yusifbeyli with the following composition:

State Agency	Minister	Period	Party
Prime Minister	Nasib Yusifbeyli	March 14, 1919 – April 1, 1920	Musavat
Minister of Foreign Affairs	Mammad Yusif Jafarov	April 14, 1919 – December 22, 1919	Musavat
Minister of Education and Religious Affairs	Rashid Khan Gaplanov	April 14, 1919 – December 22, 1919	Ahrar
Minister of Internal Affairs	Nasib Yusifbeyli	April 14, 1919 – December 22, 1919	Musavat
Minister of Defense	Samad bey Mehmandarov	December 26, 1918 – April 28, 1920	Independent
Minister of Healthcare	Abram Dastakyan	April 14, 1919 – December 22, 1919	Dashnaktsutiun
Minister of Transportation	Khudadat bey Malik-Aslanov	May 28, 1918 – April 28, 1920	Musavat
Minister of Industry and Trade	Agha Aminov	April 14, 1919 – December 22, 1919	Musavat
Minister of Postal Service and Telegraph	Jamo bey Hajinski	April 14, 1919 – April 1, 1920	Muslim Socialist Bloc
Minister of Finance	Ali Agha Hasanov	April 14, 1919 – December 22, 1919	Independent
Ministry of Justice and Labor	Aslan bey Safikurdski	April 14, 1919 – December 22, 1919	Muslim Socialist Bloc
State Controller	Nariman bey Narimanbeyov	April 14, 1919 – December 22, 1919	Musavat
Minister of Social Security	Victor Klenevski	April 14, 1919 – December 22, 1919	Slavic-Russian Society
Minister of Agriculture	Aslan bey Gardashov	April 14, 1919 – December 22, 1919	Ahrar
Minister without Portfolio	Khoren Amaspur	April 14, 1919 – December 22, 1919	Dashnaktsutiun
Head of State Security	Naghi Sheykhzamanli	August, 1919 – March, 1920	Musavat

Among notable events during the government of the fourth coalition government are the signing of oil contracts with foreign oil companies and the subsequent export of Azerbaijani oil, and the signing of the Cooperation and Defense Pact with the Democratic Republic of Georgia against the threat of Denikin forces from the north.

== See also ==
- Cabinets of the Azerbaijan Democratic Republic (1918–1920)
- Cabinet of Azerbaijan
