= Armenian National Council =

The following institutions use, or have used, the name of Armenian National Council:

- Armenian National Assembly
- Armenian National Congress (1917)
- Armenian National Council (1917–18), initially based in Tbilisi, which declared the independence of the First Republic of Armenia in 1918
- Armenian National Council of Karabakh, also referred to as People's Government of Karabakh before the rename in September 1918 to Karabakh Council
- Armenian National Council of Baku
