= Abuzar bey Rzayev =

Azerbaijani architect-engineer

Member of the Parliament of the Azerbaijan Democratic Republic(ADR)
- In office December 1918 – April 1920

Personal details
- Born: 17 October 1866 Elisabethpol, Elisabethpol Governorate, Russian Empire
- Died: 15 June 1920 (aged 53) Baku, Azerbaijan Soviet Socialist Republic

Abuzar Bey Rzayev (Azerbaijani: Abuzər bəy Rzayev, (b. 12 September 1887, Ganja, Russian Empire – d. 15 June 1920, Baku) The first qualified architect-engineer of Ganja, one of the active participants of the Azerbaijani national liberation movement. Member of the Parliament of the Azerbaijan Democratic Republic. He was a member of Rafibeyli family.

== Life ==
He received his secondary education at the madrasa in the Shah Abbas Mosque. He later graduated from the Tbilisi Realni School and received his higher education at the Moscow Technical School in 1899.

From 1899, Musa Naghiyev and Murtuza Mukhtarov worked as engineers and then as mine managers at the Bibiheybat oil fields. Due to the crisis in the oil industry, he moved to Ganja in 1909, after which he was elected deputy head of the Ganja city administration (city head), and worked effectively in the field of drinking water supply of the city. He was a member of the Ganja Provincial Executive Committee, established after the February Revolution (1917).

According to the decision of the Azerbaijani National Council to convene the parliament, he was elected a deputy from Ganja. He represented the "Neutrals" faction in the parliament, after dissolution of "Neutrals" faction, he moved to "Musavat" and the neutral faction in October 1919. At the same time, he was a member of the finance and budget commission, and later chairman. After the April occupation (1920), he worked as the director of the oil fields of Bibiheybat region for some time, and on June 15, 1920, he was arrested and shot by the Bolsheviks.
