= Mustafa bey Vakilov =

Azerbaijani politician

Mustafa Vakilov Mustafa Vəkilov
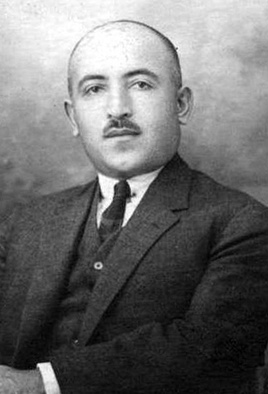

Minister of Internal Affairs of Azerbaijan Democratic Republic (ADR)
- In office February 15, 1920 – April 28, 1920
- President: Nasib Yusifbeyli (Chairman of Azerbaijani Parliament)
- Preceded by: Mammad Hasan Hajinski
- Succeeded by: Hamid Sultanov (Internal Affairs of Azerbaijan SSR)

Personal details
- Born: 1896 Qazakh, Elisavetpol Governorate, Russian Empire
- Died: 1965 (aged 68–69) Amasya, Turkey

Mustafa bey Nadir Agha oglu Vakilov (Azerbaijani: Mustafa bəy Nadir ağa oğlu Vəkilov; 1896 – 1965) was an Azerbaijani public figure, politician and diplomat. He served as the Minister of Internal Affairs. Vakilov was the youngest Azerbaijani minister.

== Early life ==
Vakilov was born in 1899 in Salahlı village located in the Qazakh district of the Elisavetpol Governorate. He graduated from the Baku gymnasium and entered the Law Department of the Moscow State University in 1912. That's where he got involved in Azerbaijani national movement. His uncle Mammad Rza Vakilov and close relative Alimardan Topchubashev played significant role in his ideological development. He later worked as a consultant to the Commissar for Internal Affairs of Transcaucasian Commissariat Akaki Chkhenkeli. He was also one of the most active members of the Muslim faction of Transcaucasian Sejm.

== Political career ==
Vakilov was affiliated with Musavat Party and served as its second chairman. He was a deputy to National Assembly of Azerbaijan. He was a member of Financial Budgetary Appropriations Commission within the parliament along with Mammad Emin Rasulzade and Nariman Narimanbeyov. Vakilov then served in the 5th cabinet of Azerbaijan Democratic Republic under Nasib Yusifbeyli as Deputy Minister of Internal Affairs. On February 15, 1920 he was appointed the Minister of Internal Affairs. He was the youngest minister within ADR government. With establishment of Soviet authority in Azerbaijan on April 28, 1920 Vakilov fled to Turkey.

Vakilov lived in Poland between 1929 and 1941 and later resided in France and Switzerland. He wrote articles on Azerbaijani history and literature for several periodicals. His writings appeared in the Turkish journals " Yeni Gafgasiya", "Odlu yurd", and "Azerbaijan yurt bilgisi". He also published political articles in the French-language journal "Prometey" and the Russian-language journal "Kavkaz", both of which were published in Paris. Vakilov wrote in several European languages.

He died in Amasya, Turkey in 1965.

== See also ==
- Azerbaijani National Council
