= Hasan bey Aghayev =

Azerbaijani public figure, journalist, medical doctor, teacher and politician

- Həsən bəy Ağayev
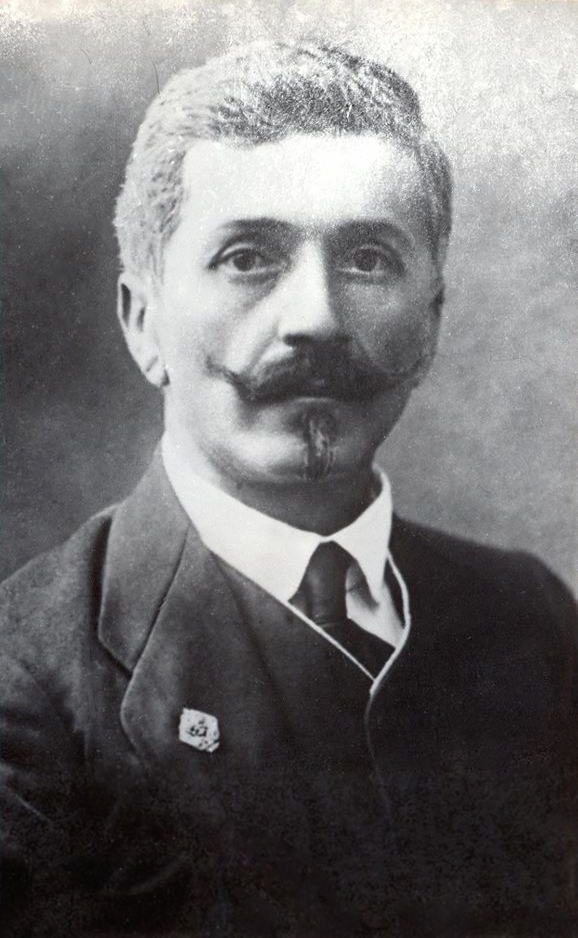

Deputy Speaker of National Assembly of Azerbaijan Democratic Republic (ADR)
- In office December 7, 1918 – February 2, 1920
- Preceded by: Office created
- Succeeded by: Mammad Yusif Jafarov

Personal details
- Born: 1875 Elizavetpol (Ganja), Elizavetpol uezd, Elisavetpol Governorate, Russian Empire
- Died: 1920 (aged 44–45) Tiflis, Georgia

Hasan bey Mashadi Huseyn bey oghlu Aghayev (Azerbaijani: حسن بگ مشهدی حسین بگ اوغلی آقاییف, Həsən bəy Məşədi Hüseyn bəy oğlu Ağayev; 1875 – 1920), known also as Hasan bey Aghayev and Hasan bey Aghazade was an Azerbaijani public figure, journalist, medical doctor, teacher and politician. He served as the Deputy Speaker of National Assembly of Azerbaijan Democratic Republic (ADR).

== Early life ==
Aghayev was born in 1875 in Yelisavetpol (Ganja), Elizavetpol uezd, Elizavetpol Governorate of Russian Empire. Aghayev, whose education was financed by Azerbaijani businessman Haji Zeynalabdin Taghiyev, graduated from the Medical Department of Moscow State University in 1901. After graduation, he worked as a public doctor and was a part-time journalist, writing for several Azerbaijani newspapers such as "Irshad", "Taraggi" and "Heqiqat", the editor of which was composer Uzeyir Hajibeyov. The main focus of his articles in newspapers was on elimination of social causes to diseases and illnesses. He was also active in social and cultural life of Baku. During the second teachers' congress in 1907, he was elected Chairman of Nijat Enlightenment Society. In 1911-1912, he published "Cənubi Qafqaz" newspaper in Elisabethpol. He also chaired the Muslim educational committee in the same city in 1911. In 1914, in cooperation with Khudadat Rafibeyli and Musa bey Rafiyev, he founded Medical Society of Elisabethpol.

== Political activity ==
In March 1917, Aghayev co-founded and was elected member of Central Committee of Turkic Federalists and in June of the same year, member of the Central Committee of Musavat Party. In December 1917, he was elected a deputy to Transcaucasian Sejm. Hasan bey Aghayev was deputy chairman of the Azerbaijani National Council, chaired by Mammad Emin Rasulzade and one of co-signers of the Declaration of Independence of Azerbaijan Democratic Republic (ADR) on May 28, 1918 in Tiflis, Georgia. From September to December 1918, Aghayev was the Chief Medical Doctor of Azerbaijan State Railway.

On December 7, 1918 Aghayev and Mammad Yusif Jafarov were elected Deputy Speakers of the National Assembly of Azerbaijan and because the speaker of the assembly, Alimardan Topchubashev was part of the Azerbaijani diplomatic mission attending Paris Peace Conference, 1919, Aghayev was acting chairman of the parliament until February 2, 1920. After occupation of Azerbaijan by the 11th Red Army in April 1920, Aghayev moved to Tiflis. On July 19, 1920 he was assassinated by Armenian terrorists Aram Yerganian and Misak Grigoryan.

== See also ==
- Azerbaijani National Council
