= Arif Hajili =

Azerbaijani politician

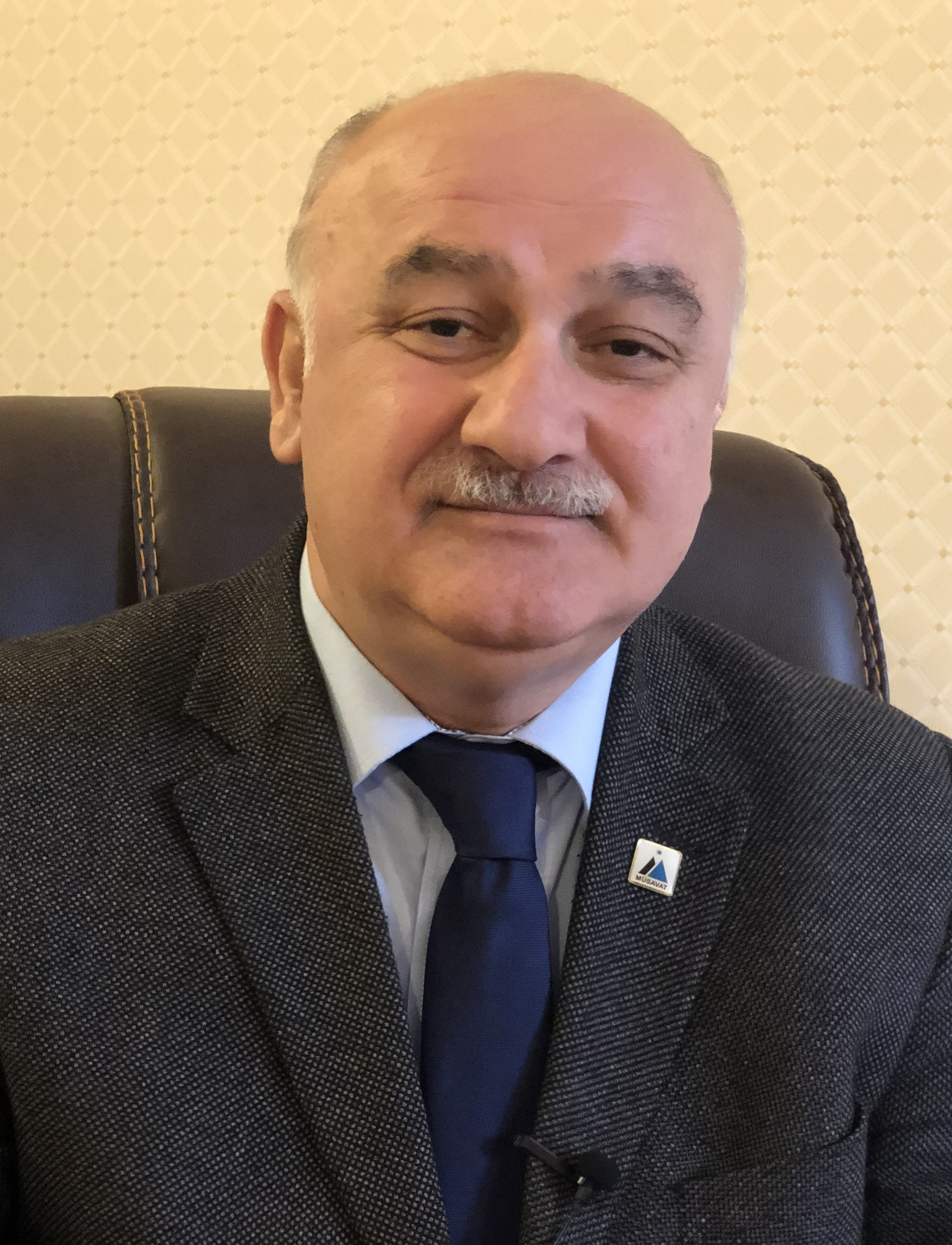

Chairman of Musavat Party
- In office 28 September 2014 – 4 May 2024
- Preceded by: Isa Gambar
- Succeeded by: Isa Gambar

Personal details
- Born: January 22, 1962 (age 64) Zaqatala, Azerbaijan SSR
- Party: Müsavat

Arif Hajili (Azerbaijani: Arif Hacılı) (born January 22, 1962), is an Azerbaijani politician and leader of Equality Party (Müsavat), the largest opposition party in Azerbaijan.

== Biography ==
Arif Hajili was born in 1962 in the Yukhari Tala village of Zagatala region. He graduated the Journalism Faculty of Baku State University. He worked as an editor at Zagatala radio station in 1983-1988. He was one of the leaders of the independence movement of Azerbaijan. Was a member of the Supreme Council of Azerbaijan in 1990-1995. Was a member of the Parliament of Azerbaijan. He was a Chairman of the Supreme Body of the PFA in 1991-1992. At various times, he was a Deputy Head of the "Musavat" party on organizational matters. He worked as a State Advisor for the territorial government and the control of Azerbaijan during the reign of Elchibey in 1992-1993. He was arrested a number of times during the rule of Aliyevs. A former prisoner of conscience. He has been the head of the Executive Office of "Musavat" party, a member of its supreme body - Divan. Since 2006. He was elected Head of the party at the VIII Congress in 2014. Currently a chairman of the Musavat Party.
