= Hikmet Hajizade =

Azerbaijani diplomat (1954–2020)

- Hikmət Hacızadə
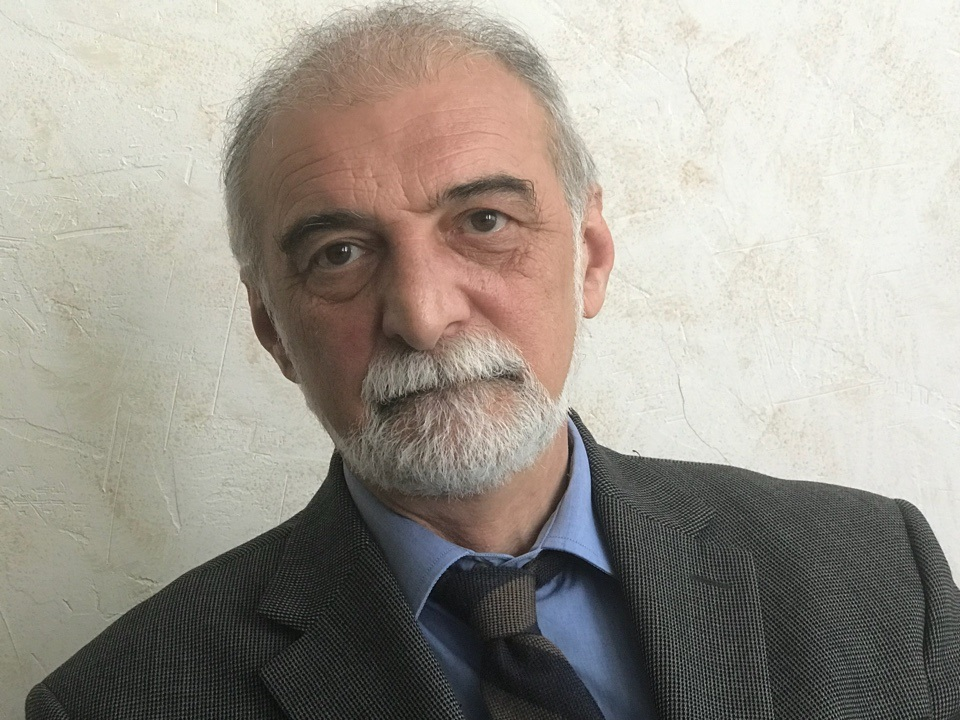
- Born: November 11, 1954; Baku
- Died: November 20, 2020; Baku
- Citizenship: Azerbaijan
- Political party: Musavat
- Other political affiliations: Azerbaijan Democracy and Prosperity Movement
- Children: Adnan Hajizade
- Website: https://hikmethadjyzadeh.org/

Hikmet Hajizade (November 11, 1954, Baku – November 20, 2020, Baku) was the politician, diplomat, former ambassador of Azerbaijan to Russia.

== Early life and education ==
Hikmet Hajizade was born in Baku in 1954. In 1977, he graduated from the Physics Department of Azerbaijan State University - ASU (now BSU).

He defended his PhD thesis in physical and mathematical sciences in Moscow in 1983. H. Hajizadeh worked as a senior research fellow at the Institute of Physics of the Azerbaijan Academy of Sciences.

== Activity ==
He actively participated in the independence movement of Azerbaijan that began with "perestroika" in 1988, was one of the founders of the Popular Front of Azerbaijan, a member of the first Board of Directors, and the editor of the newspaper "Svoboda". During the rule of the Popular Front, he worked as a deputy prime minister and plenipotentiary representative of Azerbaijan in Russia.

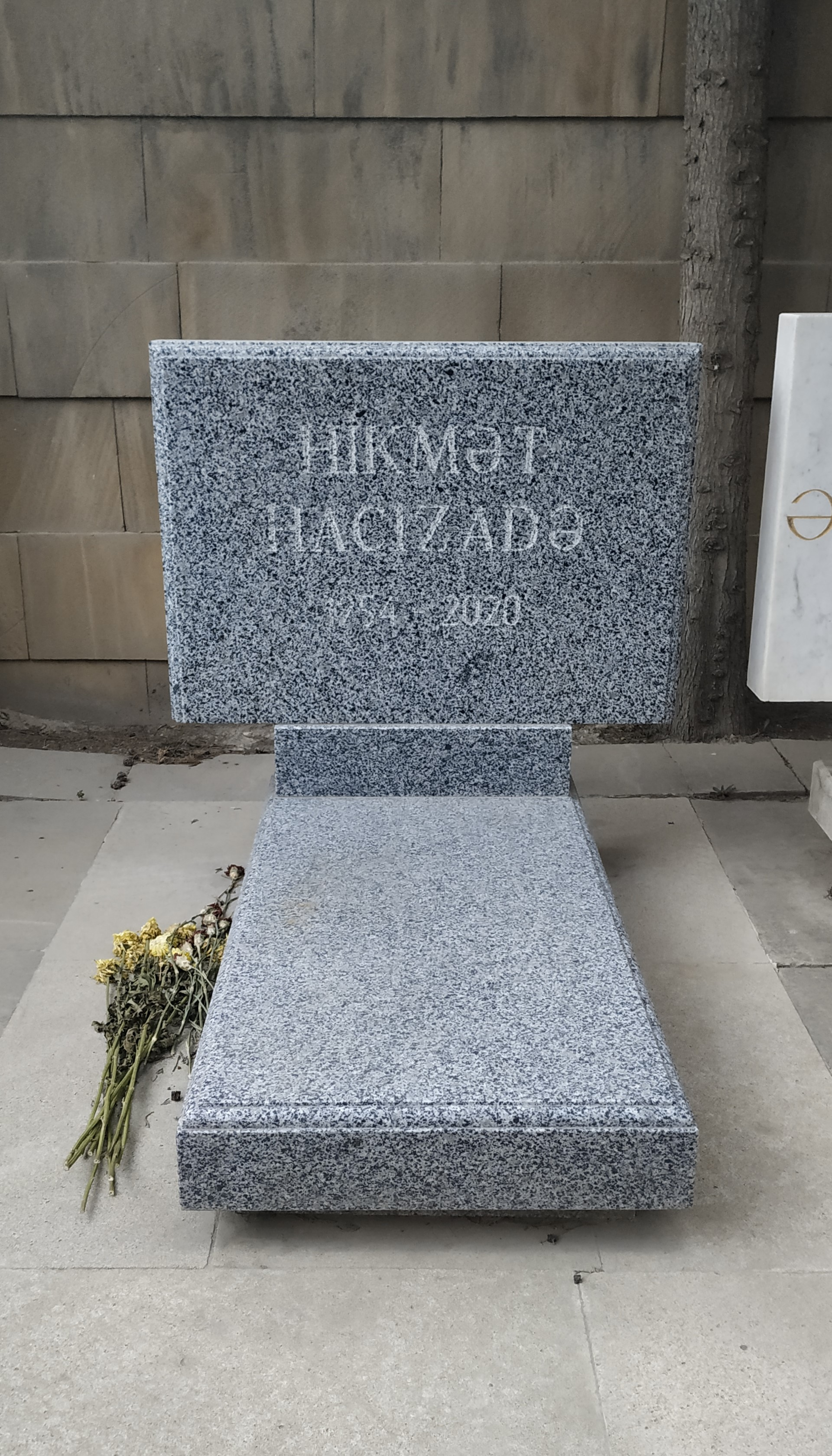
The grave of Hikmet Hajizadeh.

He has been a member of the Musavat Party since 1993. He was the founder and vice-president of the Center for Economic and Political Research (FAR-Centre), which is engaged in the dissemination of knowledge about democracy and human rights. He was the author of numerous articles and booklets on the problems of the "transition period", the history and theory of human rights.

His book "150,000 Signs about Democracy", the first essay in Azerbaijan dedicated to the problems of democracy, was published in 1995. He is the author of "Human Rights - the Basic Idea of Mankind" (1997), "Democracy: A Long Way to Go" (Democracy Anthology) and other books.

On November 17, 2014, he resigned from the ranks of the Musavat Party with his own application.

Later he became a member of the Advisory Council of the Azerbaijan Democracy and Prosperity Movement.

On November 20, 2020 Hikmet Hajizade died in Baku.
