= Rashid bey Akhundzadeh =

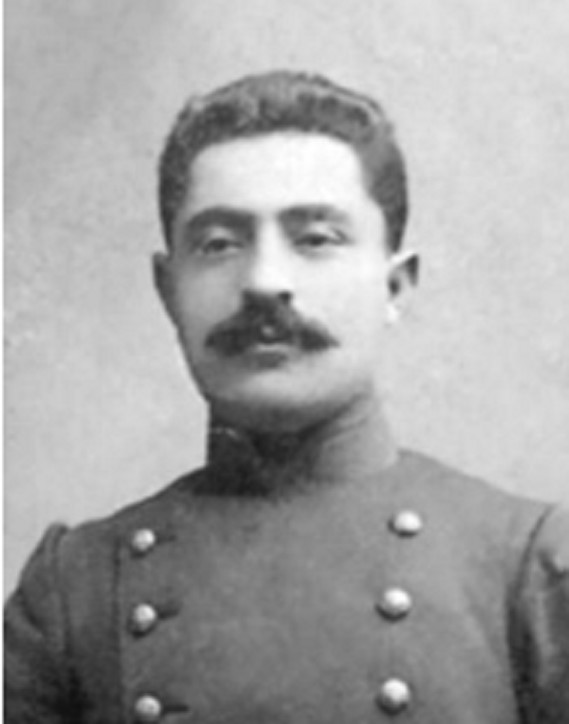

Governor of Baku
- In office 5 February 1919 – 25 August 1919
- Appointed by: Khalil bey Khasmammadov
- Preceded by: Museyib Akhijanov
- Succeeded by: Amir bey Narimanbeyov

Personal details
- Born: April 10, 1880 Salyan, Javad Uyezd, Baku Governorate
- Died: April 1940 (aged 59–60) Kirov Oblast
- Parent: Abdussalam Akhundzadeh
- Education: Saint Vladimir Royal University of Kiev

Rashid bey Akhundzadeh (Azerbaijani: Rəşid bəy Axundzadə) was a Governor of Baku in 1919 during Azerbaijan Democratic Republic.

== Early life ==
He was born on 10 April 1880 to Sheikh ul-Islam Abdussalam Akhundzadeh and his wife Ummu Salama Muradkhanova in Salyan. He studied for 4 years at the Tbilisi Real school and for 4 years at the Tbilisi 3rd gymnasium, where he studied for additional 1 year and finished the 8th grade on 20 November 1905. He was accepted to Saint Vladimir Royal University of Kiev's Faculty of Law following year, graduated in 1910. After graduation, he started to work at Tbilisi Courtroom. Later he relocated to Baku, working as an attorney.

In 1917, in the judicial system of the Baku District, he was an assistant lawyer together with Mammad Yusif Jafarov, Rustam khan Khoyski, Ali khan Kantemirov, Gasim Gasimov, Abu Muslim bey Israfilov, Hamid bey Shahtakhtinski.

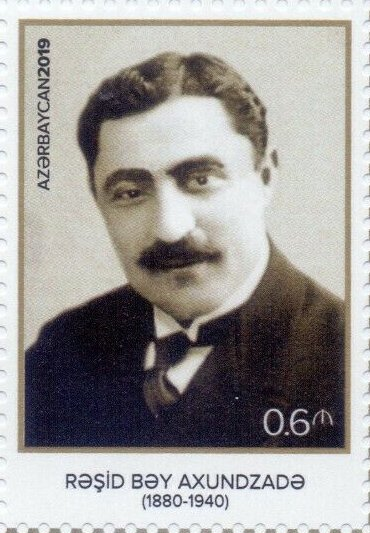
Rashid Akhundzadeh on a stamp of Azerbaijan Post, 2019

== During Azerbaijan Democratic Republic ==
On November 30, 1918, the Muslim National Committee of the former Javad Uyezd held elections for membership in the Parliament of the Republic of Azerbaijan in Salyan. Technological engineer Bakhish bey Rustambeyov from Salyan was elected MP for the city while Akhundzadeh was elected by the uyezd. Thanks to his good relations with Fatali Khan Khoyski, he was later appointed Governor of Baku on 5 February 1919. His predecessor Museyib Akhijanov became his deputy. However his term was very short as he resigned few months later, on 17 August 1919 and was replaced on 25 August 1919.

== During Azerbaijan Soviet Socialist Republic ==
He was a member of Azerbaijan Bar Association in 1923. However he was soon arrested during Great Purge and exiled to Kirov Oblast, where he died.

== Family ==
He was married to Sara Nazirova (1898–1962), daughter of playwright Najaf bey Vazirov. They had three daughters together:

1. Gülnar Behbudova (1914–1996)
2. Leyla Akhundova (1919–2003)
3. Valida Vazirova (1920–2012) — married to Suleyman Vazirov (1910–1973), Minister of Oil Industry of the Azerbaijan SSR
