= Victor Klenevski =

Azerbaijani politician

Victor Klenevski В. Кленевски
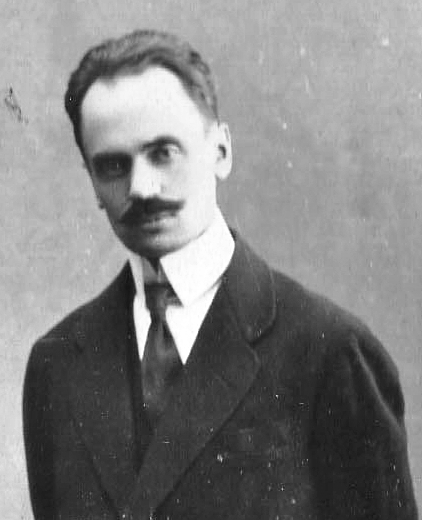

Minister of Social Security of Azerbaijan Democratic Republic (ADR)
- In office 14 April 1919 – 22 December 1919
- President: Nasib Yusifbeyli Prime Minister, (Chairman of Azerbaijani Parliament)
- Preceded by: Rustam Khan Khoyski
- Succeeded by: Musa bey Rafiyev

Victor Klenevski (Azerbaijani: Viktor Klenevski; Russian: В. Кленевский) was an Azerbaijani statesman who served as the Minister of Social Security of Azerbaijan Democratic Republic and was member of Azerbaijani National Council within the fourth cabinet of Azerbaijan Democratic Republic.

== See also ==
- Azerbaijani National Council
- Cabinets of Azerbaijan Democratic Republic (1918-1920)
- Current Cabinet of Azerbaijan Republic
