= Ashraf Bey Taghiyev =

- Born: 1867; Qarxun, Russian Empire
- Died: March 3, 1930, Baku, Azerbaijan SSR
- Citizenship: Russian Empire; Azerbaijan Democratic Republic; Soviet Union
- Occupation: Politician

Ashraf bey Hasan bey oglu Taghiyev (Azerbaijani: Əşrəf bəy Həsən bəy oğlu Tağıyev, 1867, Qarxun, Russian Empire – March 3, 1930, Baku, Azerbaijan SSR) was an Azerbaijani public and political figure, a member of the parliament of the Azerbaijan Democratic Republic (1918–1920), and was member of the "Musavat" faction.

== Life ==
Ashraf bey Taghiyev, known in Azerbaijan as Garkhunlu Ashraf bey, was born in 1867 in the village of Qarxun. He studied at the Tiflis Gymnasium. In 1908, he built a factory in Yevlakh, and in 1910, he personally opened a four-class school in the village of Upper Qarxun, followed by a seven-class Russian-Tatar school in 1919.

After the March massacre of 1918, self-defense units were for formed at the suggestion of Ashraf-bek in Qarxun District. In March 1919, Ashraf bey was re-elected as a member of the Parliament from the Aresh uezd. In 1919, he served as the district chief.

By the decision of the Transcaucasian GPU and NKVD of the Azerbaijan SSR on March 3, 1930, Ashraf-bey Taghiyev was executed for his affiliation with the "Ahrar" party and anti-revolutionary propaganda. By the decision of the Judicial Collegium of the Supreme Court for particularly serious crimes of the Azerbaijan SSR on August 29, 1989, Ashraf bey was posthumously rehabilitated.
