= Bakhish bey Rustambeyov =

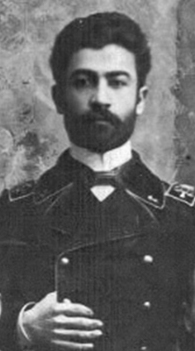

Head of Javad uezd
- In office 1918–1919
- Appointed by: Azerbaijan Democratic Republic

Personal details
- Born: 1879 Salyan, Javad uezd, Baku Governorate, Russian Empire
- Died: 1942 (aged 62–63) Baku, Azerbaijan SSR, USSR
- Parent: Asad bey Rustambeyov
- Education: Saint Petersburg State Institute of Technology

Bakhish bey Asad bey oglu Rustambeyov (Azerbaijani: Baxış bəy əsəd bəy oğlu Rustambəyov; b. 1870, Salyan, Javad uezd, Baku Governorate, Russian Empire – 1942, Baku, Azerbaijan SSR, USSR) was an Azerbaijani statesman, head of the Javad uezd and member of the Parliament of the Azerbaijan Democratic Republic.

Bakhish Bey belongs to Salyan's famous noble family, Rustambeyovs.

== Life ==
Bakhish bey Rustambeyov was born in 1870 in the city of Salyan. In 1890 he graduated from the Baku Real School and entered the Moscow Technical School. In 1893 he entered the mechanical department of the Saint Petersburg State Institute of Technology. He was expelled from the institute for participating in the student movement shortly before graduation, but then he was able to graduate. After graduating from the institute, he worked as deputy director under Shamsi Asadullayev until 1906. Bakhish bey, who worked in the same position for Agha Musa Nagiyev, then worked in the fishing industry, and in 1910–1917 in the oil fields.

In 1918 he was the head of the Javad uezd. On November 30, 1918, by decision of the Salyan National Committee, he was nominated as a member of the parliament of the Azerbaijan Democratic Republic. His membership of Parliament was accepted on January 8, 1919. He was a member of the Musavat and Non-Party faction, retaining the right to vote in accordance with the declaration promulgated at the eighty-seventh session of parliament on October 23, 1919.

After the April occupation, he worked in leadership positions in the light industry system, taught at the Fisheries Institute and Technical School, and the Institute for Advanced Studies at the People's Commissariat of Light Industry. In 1924, he was a member of the board of the Baku Mutual Credit Society. In 1929, Bakhish bey was arrested by the Bolsheviks. He died in 1942 in Baku the same year he was released from prison.
