= Haji Huseyn Afandiyev =

Azerbaijani politician (1893–1920)

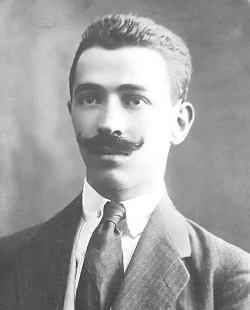
Hajı Huseyn Afandiyev

Haji Huseyn Afandiyev (1893, Goychay – 1920, Baku) was a member of the Parliament of the Azerbaijan Democratic Republic and a member of the Ahrar Party.

After the April occupation, he was executed by the Bolsheviks at the age of 27.

== About ==
Haji Huseyn Haji Abdulla oghlu Afandiyev was born in 1893 in Goychay. He was a member of the Ahrar Party. After the establishment of the Azerbaijan Democratic Republic, he was elected to the Republic's parliament from the Goychay district. He served as a member of parliament from December 15, 1918, to April 20, 1920.

On February 4, 1919, a parliamentary commission was created, headed by Samad aga Agamalioglu, to draft a land reform law for the Azerbaijan Democratic Republic. Haji Huseyn Afandiyev was one of the 9 members of this commission.

In March 1920, Haji Huseyn Afandiyev participated in suppressing the anti-government uprising, started by Armenians in Karabakh. After the Bolshevik occupation of Azerbaijan on April 27, 1920, he was arrested. On June 3, 1920, an investigator from Special Department No. 7 sentenced him to execution. He was executed at the age of 27.

On January 5, 1993, Haji Huseyn Haji Abdulla oglu Afandiyev was posthumously rehabilitated based on Article 1 of the decree issued by the Presidium of the Supreme Soviet of the USSR on January 16, 1989, "On additional measures to restore justice to the victims of repression in the 1930s–40s and early 1950s."

== Memory ==
Before the Soviet occupation, Haji Huseyn Afandiyev operated a bookstore and stationery shop called "Iqbal" in the center of Goychay. Prior to the occupation, both his shop and his two-story house were confiscated. In the following years, a dermatological venereal dispensary was established in his house.

In 2024, a book titled "Founders of the Azerbaijan Democratic Republic, Goychay's Deputy Haji Huseyn Haji Abdulla oglu Afandiyev," authored by Maharram Zulfugarli, was published, detailing his life and contributions.

== See also ==
- Ahrar Party (Azerbaijan)
- Aslan bey Gardashov
