= Musa bey Rafiyev =

Azerbaijani politician (1888–1938)

Musa bey Rafiyev Musa bəy Rəfiyev
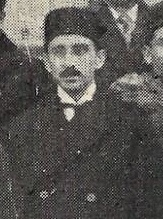

Minister of Healthcare and Social Security of Azerbaijan Democratic Republic (ADR)
- In office 24 December 1919 – 30 March 1920
- President: Fatali Khan Khoyski; Prime Minister, (Chairman of Azerbaijani Parliament)
- Preceded by: Valerian Klenevski
- Succeeded by: office terminated

Minister of Social Security and Religious Affairs
- In office 6 October 1918 – 7 December 1918
- Preceded by: office established

Special Minister in care of Social Security and Refugee Affairs
- In office 17 June 1918 – 6 October 1918
- Preceded by: portfolio established
- Succeeded by: portfolio terminated

Personal details
- Born: 1888 Ganja, Azerbaijan
- Died: 1938 (aged 49–50) Tabriz, Iran

Musa bey Rafiyev Haji Mammadhuseyn oglu (Azerbaijani: Musa bəy Rəfiyev Hacı Məmmədhüseyn oğlu; 1888–1938), also known as Musa bey Rafibeyli (Azerbaijani: Musa bəy Rəfibəyli), was an Azerbaijani public, political, and state figure. He was a member of the Muslim faction of the Transcaucasian Sejm and the Azerbaijani National Council. He held ministerial positions in the second and fifth governments of the Azerbaijan Republic. Elected to the Azerbaijan Republic Parliament from the Musavat party, he served on the Finance and Budget Commission.

He participated in the Ganja uprising against the April occupation and emigrated after the rebellion was defeated.

== Life ==
Musa Rafiyev was born in 1888 in the city of Ganja. He received his initial education at the madrasa operating under the Shah Abbas Mosque in Ganja, and later at the Ganja Men's Gymnasium. After graduating from the Ganja Men's Gymnasium with a silver medal, he entered the Imperial University of Kyiv. After graduating from the medical faculty of the Imperial University of Kyiv in 1908, he worked as a resident at the university's clinic. In November of that year, he returned to Ganja and began working as a doctor at the Yelizavetpol city hospital. Due to his exemplary work, he received the rank of "Titular Counselor" in 1913, "Collegiate Assessor" in 1914, and "Court Counselor" in 1916. In late 1914, Musa bey Rafiyev, together with Hasan bey Agayev and Khudadat bey Rafibeyli, established the first healthcare society in Ganja.

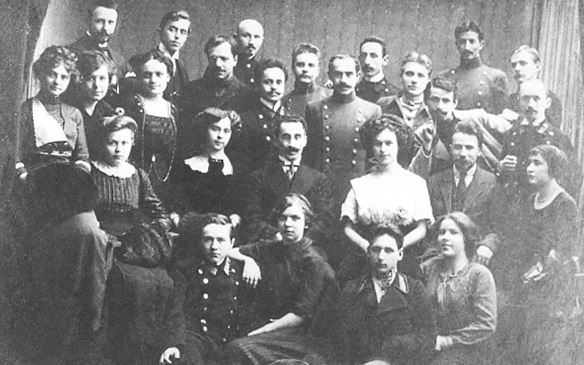
Musa bey Rafiyev (in center) and students of Kyiv Imperial University

After the February Revolution, he was appointed commissioner for the Yelizavetpol Governorate by the Special Transcaucasian Committee established by the Provisional Government. He was one of the first members of the Turkish Federalist Party founded by Nasib bey Yusifbeyli. On 17 June 1917 the unification congress of the Musavat Party and the Turkish Federalist Party was held. Musa bey Rafiyev became a member of the central committee formed after this congress. He was a member of the Muslim faction of the Transcaucasian Sejm and, after the dissolution of the Transcaucasian Democratic Federative Republic, a member of the Azerbaijani National Council.

On 17 June 1918, in the second government cabinet of the Azerbaijan Republic, Musa bey Rafiyev was appointed Minister without Portfolio. After the internal changes made by the Chairman of the Council of Ministers, Fatali Khan Khoyski, on 6 October 1918, Musa bey Rafiyev was appointed Minister of Guardianship and Religious Beliefs. On 14 November 1918, he was a member of the Azerbaijani delegation sent to Anzali for negotiations with William Thomson. On 7 December 1918 he was elected to the Azerbaijan Republic Parliament from the Musavat party and served on the Finance and Budget Commission. In the fifth government cabinet formed on 22 December 1919, Musa bey Rafiyev was appointed Minister of Public Welfare and Health, a position he held until 1 April 1920. During his tenure, 35 hospitals and 56 feldsher stations were opened under his leadership in Azerbaijan.

After the April occupation, he was one of the participants in the Ganja uprising against the occupation. After the uprising was suppressed, he emigrated to Turkey. In September 1921, he became the first chairman of the "Azerbaijan Information Bureau," established to oppose the occupation of Azerbaijan. In 1922, under Musa bey's chairmanship, the "Committee of Azerbaijani Government and Parliament Members," which was a continuation of this organization, was formed.

In October 1925, he moved with his family first to Khoy and later to the city of Tabriz. There, he opened a clinic and worked as a doctor.

Musa bey married Nina Alekseyevna. From this marriage, they had a daughter named Leyla, born in 1922, and a son named Davud, born in 1926.

He died in 1938 in Tabriz.

== See also ==
- Azerbaijani National Council
- Cabinets of Azerbaijan Democratic Republic (1918-1920)
- Current Cabinet of Azerbaijan Republic
