= Mammad Yusif Jafarov =

Azerbaijani statesman

- Məmməd Yusif Cəfərov
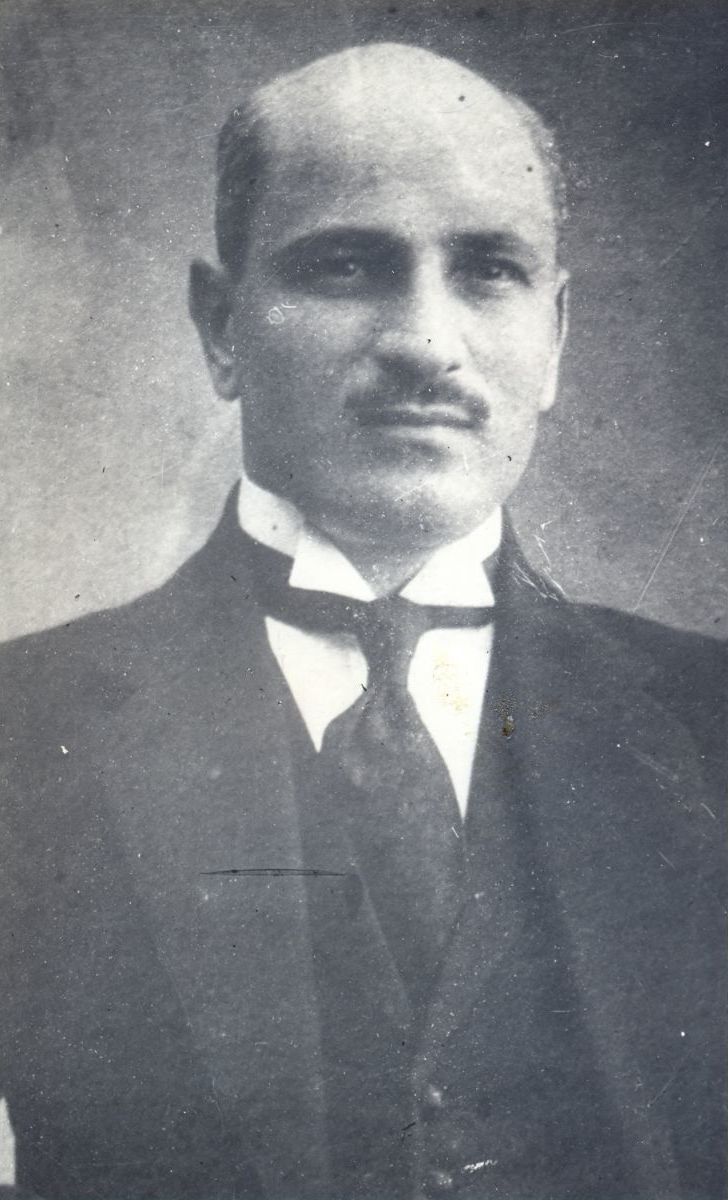

Minister of Foreign Affairs of Azerbaijan Democratic Republic (ADR)
- In office March 14, 1919 – December 22, 1919
- Preceded by: Fatali Khan Khoyski
- Succeeded by: Fatali Khan Khoyski

Deputy Speaker of National Assembly of Azerbaijan Democratic Republic (ADR)
- In office February 2, 1920 – April 27, 1920
- Preceded by: Hasan bey Aghayev
- Succeeded by: Office eliminated

Personal details
- Born: April 1, 1885 Baku, Baku Governorate, Russian Empire
- Died: May 15, 1938 (aged 53) Baku, Azerbaijan SSR, Soviet Union
- Party: Musavat

Mammad Yusif Jafarov Hajibaba oghlu (Azerbaijani: Məmməd Yusif Cəfərov Hacıbaba oğlu; 1 April [O.S. 20 March], 1885 - May 15, 1938) was an Azerbaijani statesman.

== Early life ==
Jafarov was born on 1 April [O.S. 20 March], 1885, in Baku, in the Baku Governorate of the Russian Empire (present-day Azerbaijan). He was the younger brother of a prominent professor and journalist, Ali Isgender Jafarzadeh. After completion of his secondary education, Jafarov studied at Moscow State University graduating with a cum laude degree in law in 1912. While in Moscow, he was one of the organizers of regular ethnic Azerbaijani concerts and co-founders of Azerbaijani diaspora organizations.

== Political career ==
=== Russian Empire ===
In 1912, when the Fourth Duma of Russian Empire convened in Saint Petersburg, Mammad Yusif Jafarov was elected by the Muslim population of Baku, Ganja and Erivan governorates to represent them in state parliament. In Saint Petersburg, he joined Constitutional Democratic Party (also known as Kadets). While in the Duma, he repeatedly criticized Tsar's government for their unjust colonization policy in Azerbaijan. On March 9, immediately after Russia's February Revolution, the interim government established the Transcaucasian Committee of the Duma. Jafarov was one of the members of the committee that managed the industrial and economic operations. On November 15, 1917, he was appointed Commissar of Industry and Trade of the Transcaucasian Commissariat.

=== Azerbaijan Democratic Republic ===
When Azerbaijan Democratic Republic was proclaimed on May 28, 1918, Jafarov was appointed the Minister of Industry and Trade within the new Cabinet of Azerbaijan established by Prime Minister Fatali Khan Khoyski. When the first cabinet was dissolved, he left his post and later served as a diplomatic representative of Azerbaijan in the Georgian government. On March 14, 1919, Jafarov was appointed Minister of Foreign Affairs of Azerbaijan by the new government of Prime Minister Nasib Yusifbeyli. Jafarov is credited for his extensive work in disseminating information about Azerbaijan in the international community. In October 1919, he joined the Musavat party. In December of the same year, Jafarov resigned as the cabinet of Yusifbeyli dissolved. In February 1920, he was appointed Deputy Speaker of Parliament of Azerbaijan. Due to the absence of the Speaker, Alimardan Topchubashov who was at the Versailles Peace Conference and eventually achieved the de facto recognition of Azerbaijan Democratic Republic in January by the Council of Allied Powers, Jafarov served as the acting speaker and head of government until April 27, 1920, when Azerbaijan was occupied by Bolshevik 11th Red Army and the ADR ceased to exist. He signed the documents of the peaceful surrender of the Azerbaijani government to the Bolsheviks.

=== Soviet Azerbaijan ===
During the Soviet rule of the Azerbaijan SSR, Jafarov retired from politics and worked as a legal counselor at Azerbaijani wine-making and cotton-wool trusts. He died on May 15, 1938, in Baku.

== See also ==
- Minister of Foreign Affairs of Azerbaijan
- Azerbaijan Democratic Republic
- Azerbaijani National Council
- Yusif Jafarov
