= Armenian National Council of Baku =

Representative body of the Armenians

Armenian National Council in Baku was a representative body of the Armenians residing on the Azerbaijani territory.

When the Yerevan-based Armenian Congress of Eastern Armenians was established in October 1917, it united the Armenian National Councils all around the Russian Empire. It united Armenian National Council of Karabagh, Armenian National Council of Baku, and Armenian National Council of Tiflis.
