= Muslim Socialist Bloc =

The Muslim Socialist Bloc was a political party in Transcaucasus/Azerbaijan. The party was formed in the fall of 1917, as an Azeribaijani offshoot of the Socialist-Revolutionary Party. The main leaders of the party were Aslan bey Safikurdski and Ibrahim Haidarov. The Muslim Socialist Bloc had a predominantly agrarian party, with a loose organizational structure.

The party obtained 159,770 votes in the 1917 Russian Constituent Assembly election.

When the South Transcaucasian Seim was formed in 1918, the Muslim Socialist Bloc held seven seats: Ibrahim Haidarov, Ali Khan Kantemirov, Aslan Bey Safikurdski, Ahmad Jovdat Pepinov, Baghir Rzayev, Jamo Hajinski and Mahammad Maharramov.
