= Azerbaijani National Council =

Political interparietal entity

Azerbaijani National Council Azərbaycan Xalq Cümhuriyyəti Milli Şurası

Type
- Type: Unicameral

History
- Established: 27 May 1918
- Disbanded: 3 December 1918
- Preceded by: Established
- Succeeded by: Parliament of the Azerbaijan Democratic Republic

Leadership
- President of Azerbaijani National Council: Mahammad Amin Rasulzade

Structure
- Seats: 44
- Political groups: Musavat and Democratic Independents (30); Ittihad (3); Muslim Socialist Bloc (7); Hummat (4)

The Azerbaijani National Council (Azerbaijani: Azərbaycan Xalq Cümhuriyyəti Milli Şurası) was the first delegated legislative body of the Azerbaijan Democratic Republic (ADR) from 27 May 1918 to 17 June 1918 and again from 16 November 1918 to 3 December 1918. It was succeeded by the Parliament (Azerbaijani: Parlament), a legislative body formed through nationwide general elections.

== Background ==
After the February Revolution like many ethnic minorities of the shrinking Russian Empire, Azeris also began to form movements aimed at political autonomy from Russia. In the provinces and districts where Azeris constituted a considerable population, local Muslim National Councils (MNC) were formed. On March 27, 1917, delegates of MNCs gathered to establish the Temporary Executive Committee for the MNCs. Mammad Hasan Hajinski became head of this committee, which also included Mahammad Amin Rasulzade, Alimardan bey Topchubashev, Fatali Khan Khoyski, and other founders of the future Azerbaijan Democratic Republic. After the October Revolution the South Caucasus was separated from mainland Russia, hence the Transcaucasian Sejm formed in Tbilisi proclaimed the independence of the Transcaucasian Democratic Federative Republic. Azerbaijanis formed the largest faction of the same numbering, 44 members, and headed by Mammed Amin Rasulzade. These 44 members represented four different political parties and blocks: Musavat and neutral Democrats; the Muslim Socialist Bloc; Ittihad-i Muslimin (or simply Ittihad); the Union of Muslims of Russia; and the Muslim Social Democratic Party.

== Formation ==
When the 31 March–2 April massacres took place in Baku, the Temporary Executive Committee was crushed, its factual leader Alimardan bey Topchubashev was arrested, and the Azeri intelligentsia was driven out of Baku; Tbilisi became the headquarters of the Azerbaijani National Movement. After the Transcaucasian Democratic Federative Republic fell on 26 May 1918 and its bodies were dissolved, the Azerbaijani faction of the Sejm was renamed the Azerbaijani National Council (NC). It immediately undertook parliamentary functions and proclaimed the foundation of Azerbaijani Democratic Republic on 28 May 1918. On 16 June the Azerbaijani National Council moved to Ganja and declared it Azerbaijan's temporary capital awaiting the fall of the Baku Commune. The Council met with resistance of ultra-nationalists who accused it of being too left-wing and intolerance of Ottoman Commander Nuru Pasha. It had to be abolished the next day, leaving all power to the Council of Ministers led by Fatali Khan Khoyski.

== Second Convocation ==
After the defeat of the Ottoman Empire in World War I and the withdrawal of Ottoman forces from Azerbaijan, the power of the ultra-nationalists once backed by Nuru Pasha weakened. This allowed for the Azerbaijani National Council to be re-established and start negotiations with the British occupation forces. The Council was completely abolished after the opening of the Parlaman on 7 December 1918. The Parliament of ADR included the representatives of the majority Azerbaijani parties as well as MPs from Armenian, Russian, Jewish, German and Polish minorities of Azerbaijan and representatives of trade unions.

== Members of the Azerbaijani National Council ==
- Mahammad Amin Rasulzade
- Alimardan bey Topchubashov
- Fatali Khan Khoyski
- Nasib bey Yusifbeyli
- Mammad Yusif Jafarov
- Hasan bey Aghayev
- Khosrov bey Sultanov
- Musa bey Rafiyev
- Mammad Hasan Hajinski
- Nariman bey Narimanbeyov
- Mir Hidayat bey Seyidov
- Khalil Khasmammadov
- Gazi Ahmad Mahammadbeyov
- Aslan bey Gardashov
- Shafi bey Rustambeyov
- Javad Malik-Yeganov
- Mustafa Mahmudov
- Mehdi bey Hajibababeyov
- Haji Molla Salim Akhundzadeh
- Mehdi bey Hajinski
- Khudadat bey Malik-Aslanov
- Museyib Akhijanov
- Lutfali bey Behbudov
- Firudin bey Kocharli
- Ibrahim Vakilov
- Hamid bey Shahtakhtinski
- Rahim bey Vakilov
- Alasgar bey Mahmudov
- Yusif Afandizadeh
- Mirza Jalal Yusifzadeh
- Mammad Rza Vakilov
- Islam bey Gabulov
- Samad aga Agamalioglu
- Akbar agha Sheykhulislamov
- Ibrahim Abilov
- Jafar Akhundov
- Mir-Yagub Mir-Mehdizadeh
- Heybatgulu Mammadbeyov
- Sultan Majid Ganiyev
- Ibrahim bey Heydarov
- Ali khan Gantemir
- Aslan bey Safikurdski
- Ahmad bey Pepinov
- Baghir Rzayev
- Jamo bey Hajinski
- Maharram Maharramov
