= Musavat =

Musavat Party Müsavat Firqəsi
- Leader: Isa Gambar
- Founders: Mahammad Amin Rasulzade; Mahammad Ali Rasulzade; Abbasgulu Kazimzade; Taghi Naghiyev
- Founded: 1911; 115 years ago
- Ideology: Liberalism; Civic nationalism Faction: Elchibeyism; Historical: Pan-Turkism; Pan-Islamism; Anti-communism
- Political position: Centre
- European affiliation: Alliance of Liberals and Democrats for Europe Party
- Colors: Blue
- National Assembly: 0 / 125

Party flag

Website
- musavat.org.az

The Müsavat Party (Azerbaijani: Müsavat Firqəsi, from Arabic: مساواة musāwāt, lit. 'equality' or 'parity') is the oldest existing political party in Azerbaijan. Its history can be divided into three periods: Early Musavat, Musavat-in-exile and New Musavat.

The party was prohibited from contesting the 1995 and 2000 parliamentary elections in Azerbaijan by the Heydar Aliyev regime. At the time, it was one of the major opposition parties in the country.

== Early Musavat (1911–1923) ==
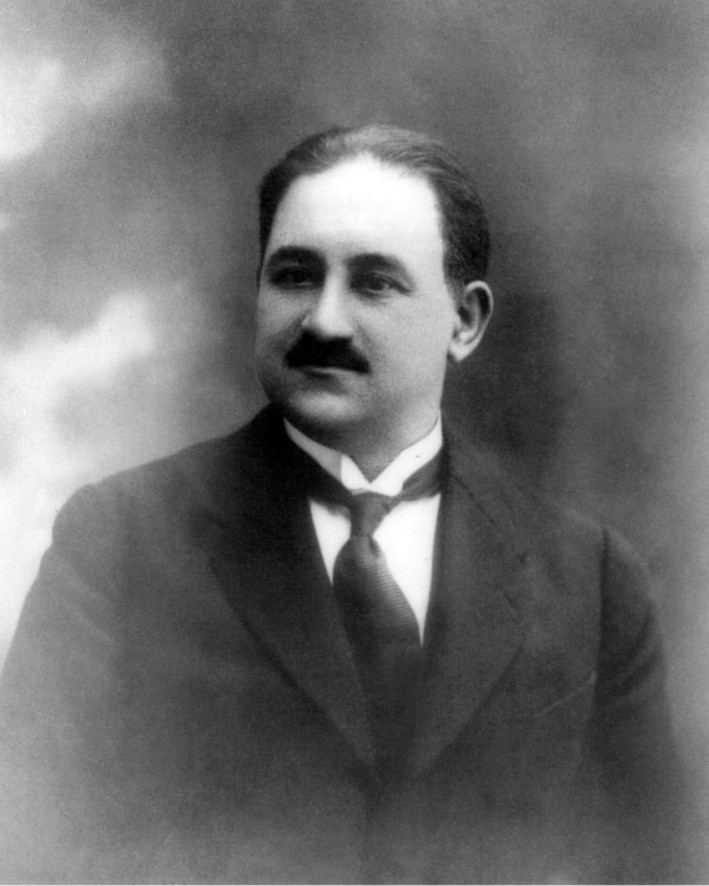
Mahammad Amin Rasulzade, founder of Musavat

Musavat was founded in 1911 in Baku as a secret organization by Mahammad Amin Rasulzade, his cousin Mahammad Ali Rasulzade, Abbasgulu Kazimzade, and Taghi Nagioglu. Its initial name was the Muslim Democratic Musavat Party. The first members were Veli Mikayiloghlu, Seyid Huseyn Sadig, Abdurrahim bey, Yusif Ziya bey and Seyid Musavi bey. Early Musavat members also included future Communist leader of Azerbaijan SSR Nariman Narimanov. This initiative from Mahammad Amin Rasulzade came when he was living in exile in Istanbul.

In its early years before, the First World War, Musavat was a relatively small, secret underground organization, much like its counterparts throughout the Middle East, working for the prosperity and political unity of the Muslim and Turkic-speaking world. Although Musavat espoused pan-Islamic ideology and its founder was sympathetic to the pan-Turkic movement, the party supported the tsarist regime during the First World War. Russia's social democrats perceived the foundation of Musavat in what they considered "imperial, orientalist terms, governed by the long-standing ideological categories of Muslim backwardness, treachery and religious fanaticism", as a betrayal of historic proportions.

Musavat's programme, which appealed to the Azerbaijani masses and assured the party of the sympathy of the Muslims abroad, announced the following aims:

1. The unity of all Muslim peoples without regard to nationality or sect.
2. Restoration of the independence of all Muslim nations.
3. Extension of material and moral aid to all Muslim nations which fight for their independence.
4. Help to all Muslim peoples and states in offense and in defence.
5. The destruction of the barriers which prevent the spread of the above-mentioned ideas.
6. The establishment of contact with parties striving for the progress of the Muslims.
7. The establishment, as need might arise, of contact and exchange of opinion with foreign parties which have the well being of humanity as their aim.
8. The intensification of the struggle for the existence of all Muslims and the development of their commerce, trade and economic life in general.

During this time, the Musavat party supported some pan-Islamist and pan-Turkist ideas. Pan-Turkic element in Musavat's ideology was a reflection of the novel ideas of the Young Turk revolution in Ottoman Empire. The founders of this ideology were Azerbaijani intellectuals of the Russian Empire, Ali bey Huseynzade and Ahmed-bey Agayev (known in Turkey as Ahmet Ağaoğlu), whose literary works used the linguistic unity of Turkic-speaking peoples as a factor for the national awakening of various nationalities inhabiting the Russian Empire.

The Menshevik and Social Revolutionary parties of Baku, both largely dependent upon the support of selected Georgian, Armenian and Jewish cadres, as well as upon the ethnic Russian workers, had long vilified the Muslims as "inert" and "unconscious". For them as well as for Bolsheviks, Constitutional Democrats and Denikinists, the Musavat, by default, was the false friend of social democracy, just a party of feudal "beks and khans". These accusations, centerpieces of a paranoid style in social-democratic politics, have endured in the historical literature far beyond their origins. But this form of attitude also alienated predominant Muslim groups from Russia's mainstream social democrats, as Musavat's shifting politics and populist slogans started receiving bigger appeal among the Muslim worker audience. Musavat leaders were largely well-educated professionals from the upper class echelons of Azeri society; its mass membership, most recruited between 1917 and 1919, comprised the poorly-educated Muslims underclass of Baku.

=== Early Musavat under Rasulzade leadership ===
Flag of the Musavat Party of Turkic Federalists (1917)

After the Amnesty Act of 1913 dedicated to the 300th anniversary of the Romanov dynasty, Mahammad Amin Rasulzade returned to Azerbaijan and undertook party leadership. Despite the party still being secret, Rasulzade managed to found newspaper the newspaper Achig Soz (1915–1918), in which Musavat's aims and goals, this time polished and defined in Rasulzade's interpretations, were implicitly advocated. Only after the February Revolution, when Musavat ceased to be a secret organization and became a legal political party did the newspaper officially become the party's organ.

The Baku Committee of Muslim Social Organizations, as well as the Musavat, were quite radical during the early days of the February Revolution: they wanted a democratic republic, which would guarantee the rights of Muslims. The Soviet historian A. L. Popov writes that the Musavat cannot be a priori classified as a reactionary party of Khans and Beks, because in the early revolutionary period the Musavat stood on the positions of democracy and even socialism. "Until a certain time the Baku Committee of Muslim Social Organizations and the Musavat party successfully fulfilled the mission not only of representing the general national interests but also of guiding the Azerbaijani workers' democracy".

On June 17, 1917, Musavat merged with the Party of Turkic Federalists, another national-democratic right-wing organization founded by Nasibbey Usubbekov and Hasan bey Agayev, taking on a new name of Musavat Party of Turkic Federalists. Thus, Musavat became the main political force of Caucasian Muslims.

In October 1917 Musavat convoked in its first congress where it adopted a new covenant, with 76 articles.

1. Russia has to become a federative democratic republic based on national and territorial autonomy.
2. Freedom of speech, conscience, stamp, unions, strikes have to be confirmed by the constitution and guaranteed by the state.
3. All citizens in spite of religion, nationality, gender, and political ideology are equal in front of the law. The passport system is to be annulled. Every citizen is given the right to move freely both inside the borders and outside the borders of the country.
4. For all workers and office workers the working day is limited with eight hours.
5. All state, crown, noble and private lands are distributed between peasant free.
6. Courts only obey the law and from now on no citizen is subject to punishment if not following the resolution of the competent authorities.
7. Universal free and compulsory elementary and high education.

Particularly, new covenant said:

Article 1: The form of the state of Russia should be a federative democratic republic based on principles of national autonomy.
Article 3: All ethnicities having territories of compact inhabiting any part of Russia should receive national autonomy. Azerbaijan, Kyrgyzstan, Turkistan and Bashkortostan should receive territorial autonomy, Turks living along the Volga and the Crimean Turks should receive a cultural autonomy in the case of impossibility of territorial autonomy. The Party considers as its sacred duty to support any non-Turkic ethnicities' quests for autonomy and help them.
Article 4: Ethnicities having no exact territory of compact inhabiting should receive national cultural autonomy.

During the period from February until November 1917, Musavat shared the idea of federalism without separating from Russia. In accordance with the doctrine accepted by the Special Transcaucasian Committee (OZAKOM) the Georgian, Armenian, and Azerbaijani territories were authorised to rule independent domestic policy, leaving to the Provisional Russian government only foreign affairs, army and defense, and customs. However, Musavat as well as the other Muslim unions got quickly disappointed in cooperation with the Provisional Government, as it had no wish to delegate to the Muslim territories more independence.

Having got the news about the October Revolution in Petrograd (Saint Petersburg) Transcaucasia did not accept the new Bolshevik power. In February 1918 Transcaucasian Council ("Sejm") started its work in Tbilisi. Musavat entered the Sejm as one of the ruling parties, having 30 deputies of 125. The other parties represented in the new institution were Georgian mensheviks (32 deputies) and Armenian "dashnaks" (27 deputies). At this stage, Musavat started propagating the pan-Islamist and pan-Turkish ideas and aimed at the creation of a United Muslim State under the protection of Turkey (Ottoman Empire). The majority of the Party's members were merchants, white-collars and partially peasantry.

Musavat became the tenth largest party elected to the Russian Constituent Assembly (1918).

=== Musavat in ADR Government ===
After the disintegration of the Russian Empire and the Declaration of Independence, Musavat became the leading party of the newly established Azerbaijan Democratic Republic, holding the majority of mandates in its parliaments, at first in Azerbaijani National Council and then in Parlaman ("parliament"), Rasulzade being its first head of state (28 May 1918 – 7 December 1918). Under the Musavat's leadership, the name "Azerbaijan" was adopted; a name that prior to the proclamation of the ADR was solely used to refer to the adjacent region of contemporary northwestern Iran. Azerbaijan became in 1918 the first secular democracy in the Muslim world. A year later, in 1919, Azerbaijani women were granted the right to vote, before the U.S. and some European countries.

The following Musavat members held positions in successive ADR governments:

==== First cabinet (May 28, 1918 – June 17, 1918) ====
- Kh. Sultanov – Minister of Defense
- Mammad Hassan Hajinski – Minister of Foreign Affairs
- Nasib bey Yusifbeyli – Minister of Finance and National Education
- M. Y. Jafarov – Minister of Trade and Industry

==== Second cabinet (June 17, 1918 – December 7, 1918) ====
- Mammad Hassan Hajinski – Minister of Foreign Affairs
- Nasib bey Yusifbeyli – Minister of National Education and Religious Affairs
- Kh. Sultanov – acting Minister of Defense; Envoy to Karabakh and Zangezur
- Musa bey Rafiyev – Minister of Social Security and Religious Affairs
- Khalil bey Khasmammedov – State Minister of Internal Affairs

==== Third cabinet (December 12, 1918 – March 14, 1919) ====
- Kh. Khasmammedov – Minister of Interior
- Nasib bey Yusifbeyli – Minister of Education and Religious Affairs
- Kh. Sultanov – Minister of Agriculture

==== Fourth cabinet (March 14, 1919 – December 22, 1919) ====
- Nasib bey Yusifbeyli – Chairman of the Council of Ministers (Prime Minister)
- M. Y. Jafarov – Minister of Foreign Affairs
- N. Narimanbeyli – State Inspector
- Kh. Khasmammedov – Minister of the Interior

==== Fifth cabinet (December 12, 1919 – April 1, 1920) ====
- Nasib bey Yusifbeyli – Chair of the Council of Ministers (Prime Minister)
- Mammad Hassan Hajinski – Minister of Interior
- Kh. Khasmammedov – Minister of Justice
- M. Rafiyev – Minister of Social Welfare and Health

After the fall of the First Republic in April 1920 as a result of the Bolshevik invasion, Musavat switched to secret activities again, by forming a secret committee, in which even famous Azeri playwright Jafar Jabbarli participated. The committee's most famous action was the preparation of the Rasulzade's flight from the Russian SFSR to Finland. Overall, Musavat prepared and conducted several armed insurgency operations, e.g. the rebellions of Ganja, Karabakh, Zagatala, and Lankaran. But the Soviets also repressed Musavat by arresting at least 2,000 members of Musavat up to 1923. Most prominent Musavat members thus were killed, exiled, or escaped abroad and the party ceased all its activities within Azerbaijan in 1923.

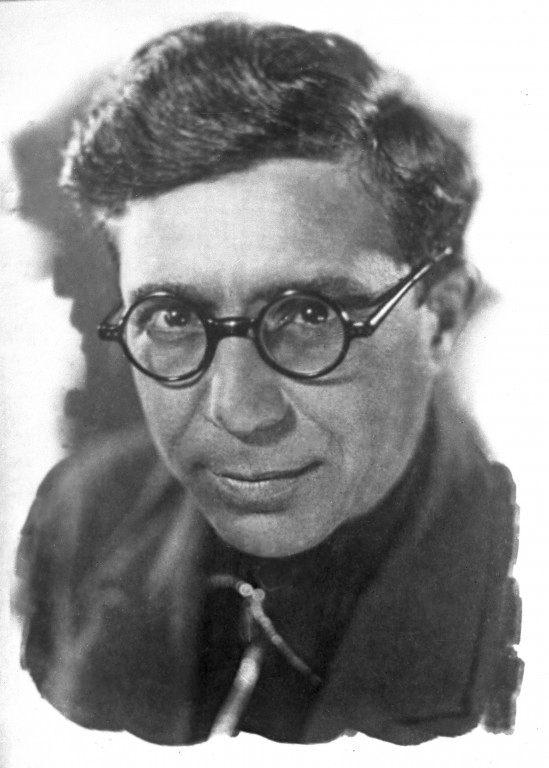
Jafar Jabbarli for a while worked for the secret Musavat

== Musavat in exile ==
Activities of Musavat in exile begin at the end of 1922 and at the beginning of 1923. in order to coordinate and lead these activities Mahammad Amin Rasulzade established a Foreign Bureau of Musavat in 1923, but also created the Azerbaijani National Center in order to coordinate their activity with other Azeri political immigrants not affiliated with Musavat. Istanbul became the center of Musavat-in-exile in the 1920s and early 30s, before moving to Ankara in the late 1940s.

=== Members of the Foreign Bureau ===
- Mahammad Amin Rasulzade, chairman
- Mirza Bala Mammadzadeh, secretary
- Khalil bey Khasmammadov, treasurer
- Shafi bey Rustambeyov
- Mustafa bey Vakilov
- Mehmet Sadık Aran
- Abbasgulu Kazimzade

=== Members of the Azerbaijani National Center ===
- Mahammad Amin Rasulzade
- Khalil bey Khasmammadov
- Mustafa bey Vakilov
- Akbar agha Sheykhulislamov
- Abdulali bey Amirjanov

=== Chairmen of Musavat in exile ===
- Mahammad Amin Rasulzade (1917–1955)
- Mirza Bala Mammadzadeh (1955–1959)
- Kerim Oder (1959–1981)
- Mehmed Azer Aran (1981–1992)

=== Newspapers and journals published by the Musavat Party in exile ===
- Yeni Kafkasya journal (1923–1928), Turkey
- Azeri Turk journal (1928–1929), Turkey
- Odlu Yurdu journal (1929–1931), Turkey
- Bildirish newspaper (1930–1931), Turkey
- Azerbaycan Yurd Bilgisi journal (1932–1934), Turkey
- Istiklal newspaper (1932-?), Germany
- Kurtulush journal (1934–1938), Germany
- Musavat Bulleteni (1936-?), Poland, Turkey
- Azerbaijan (1952–current), Turkey

== New Musavat (since 1989) ==
The resurrection of Musavat in Azerbaijan came in 1989, during the second independence of Azerbaijan. A group of intellectuals created the "Azerbaijan National Democratic New Musavat Party". Later that group formed the "Restoration Center of the Musavat Party" and was recognized by Musavat-in-exile. In 1992 delegates of New Musavat and Musavat-in-exile gathered in the "III Congress of Musavat" and formally re-established the party as the Musavat Party. One of the leaders of the Popular Front, Isa Gambar was elected its chairman. He remains its leader as of 2026. Among the early members of the party were politicians and diplomats such as Hikmet Hajizade, who served as Azerbaijan's ambassador to Russia for a time. The party structure consists of "Başqan" (Leader), "Divan" (Executive Board), and "Məclis" (Congress).

Since 1993, Musavat has been in the opposition to the ruling New Azerbaijan Party. Due to a split between its nationalist and its liberal wing, the party failed to adopt a unified program at the October 1997 congress. At the 2000/2001 elections, the party won 4.9% of the popular vote and two out of 125 seats. As the party's candidate, its leader Isa Qambar won 12.2% of the popular vote in the 15 October 2003 presidential elections. At the parliamentary elections of November 6, 2005, it joined the Freedom alliance and won inside the alliance five seats. Musavat is also known for its protests against the Azerbaijani government such as that took place on October 16, 2003, after Isa Qambar had lost the election, as well as on March 12, 2011.

When Musavat applied for membership of the European Liberal Democrat and Reform Party (ELDR, now Alliance of Liberals and Democrats for Europe Party, ALDE), some members considered Musavat's ideology to be incompatible with Western liberalism. Board member Nasib Nasibli even resigned, stating that the party was committed to Turkic nationalism rather than liberalism. Nevertheless, Musavat was eventually admitted to ELDR.

The party has alleged that the Azerbaijani government has been seized by leading politicians of Kurdish, Talysh, Armenian or other ethnic groups of non-Turkic origin.

== Election results ==
=== Presidential elections ===
Election	Party candidate	Votes	%	Result
2003	Isa Gambar	338,145	13.97%	Lost ✗

=== National Assembly elections ===
Election	Leader	Votes	%	Seats	+/–	Position	Government
1995–1996	Isa Gambar			1 / 125	New	▲9th	Opposition
2000–2001	Isa Gambar		4.9	2 / 125	▲1	▲5th	Opposition
2005	Isa Gambar			5 / 125	▲3	▲2nd	Opposition
2010	Isa Gambar	47,942	2.01	0 / 125	▼5	2nd	Extra-parliamentary
2015	Arif Hajili	24,995	0.88	0 / 125	▼1	▼6th	Extra-parliamentary
2020	Arif Hajili	38,714	1.66	0 / 125	0	▲2nd	Extra-parliamentary
2024	Isa Gambar	15,278	0.64	0 / 125	0	▼5th	Extra-parliamentary
