= Transcaucasian Commissariat =

1917-1918 short-lived government in the South Caucasus

Transcaucasian Commissariat Закавказский комиссариат (Russian) Zakavkazskij Komissariat ამიერკავკასიის კომისარიატი (Georgian) amierk’avk’asiis k’omisariat’i
- Autonomous area of Russia
- 1917–1918
- Capital: Tiflis (now Tbilisi)
- Government
  - Type: Commissariat
- Chairman
  - 1917–1918: Evgeni Gegechkori
- History
  - Established: 15 November 1917
  - Independence: 22 April 1918
Preceded by	Succeeded by
Special Transcaucasian Committee	Transcaucasian Democratic Federative Republic

The Transcaucasian Commissariat was established at Tbilisi on 15 November 1917, as the first government of the independent Transcaucasia following the October Revolution in Petrograd. The Commissariat decided to strengthen the Georgian–Armenian–Azerbaijani union by convoking a Diet or general assembly (Sejm) in January 1918. It declared independence from Soviet Russia and formed the Transcaucasian Democratic Federative Republic after being faced with the threat of being overrun by the Ottoman invasion.

A project to change the boundaries of provinces and districts in the Transcaucasian region proposed to the Minister of Internal Affairs of the Provisional Government by a meeting held on 14-15 October 1917 under the Special Transcaucasian Committee (OZAKOM) on the implementation of zemstvo reform and the redistribution of administrative boundaries of provinces and districts of Transcaucasia, as well as by the decree of the Transcaucasian Commissariat of 16 December 1917 "On the introduction of zemstvo in Transcaucasia".

== Decline ==
Peace talks were initiated with the Ottoman Empire in March 1918, but broke down quickly as the Ottoman officials refused to accept the authority of the Commissariat. The Treaty of Brest-Litovsk, which ended Russia's involvement in the First World War, conceded parts of the Transcaucasus to the Ottoman Empire, who continued their campaign in the region in order to take control of the territory. Faced with this imminent threat, the TDFR was proclaimed as an independent state on 22 April 1918. Further negotiations began immediately with the Ottomans, which recognized the state.

== See also ==
- Special Transcaucasian Committee (OZaKom, Ozakom).
- Transcaucasian Democratic Federative Republic (TDFR, ZKDFR).
