= Makhmudov =

Makhmudov / Mahmudov (masculine), Makhmudova / Mahmudova (feminine) is a surname common in the former Soviet countries. It is a patronymic surname derived from the given name Makhmud by the Russian way of patronymic derivation with the suffix -ov.

Patronymic surnames derived from similar given names include Makhmutov, Mammadov, Mammedov, Mehmedović, Mehmedov.

Notable people with the surname include:

- Abdul Mahmudov
- Aida Mahmudova
- Arastun Mahmudov
- Akzhol Makhmudov
- Arslanbek Makhmudov (born 1989), Russian heavyweight boxer
- Denis Mahmudov
- Dilshod Mahmudov (born 1982), Uzbekistani boxer
- Eldar Mahmudov
- Emin Mahmudov (born 1992), Azerbaijani-Russian football player
- Iskander Makhmudov (born 1963), Uzbek-born Russian businessman and philanthropist
- Jeyran Mahmudova
- Khazar Mahmudov
- Khurshed Makhmudov (born 1982), Tajikistani football player
- Mustafa Mahmudov
- Nado Makhmudov (1907–1990), Armenian-born Soviet Kurdish writer
- Shahlo Mahmudova
- Viktor Makhmudov
- Yagub Mahmudov (born 1939), Azerbaijani historian
