= Independence Day (Azerbaijan) =

Day the Azerbaijan Democratic Republic was founded

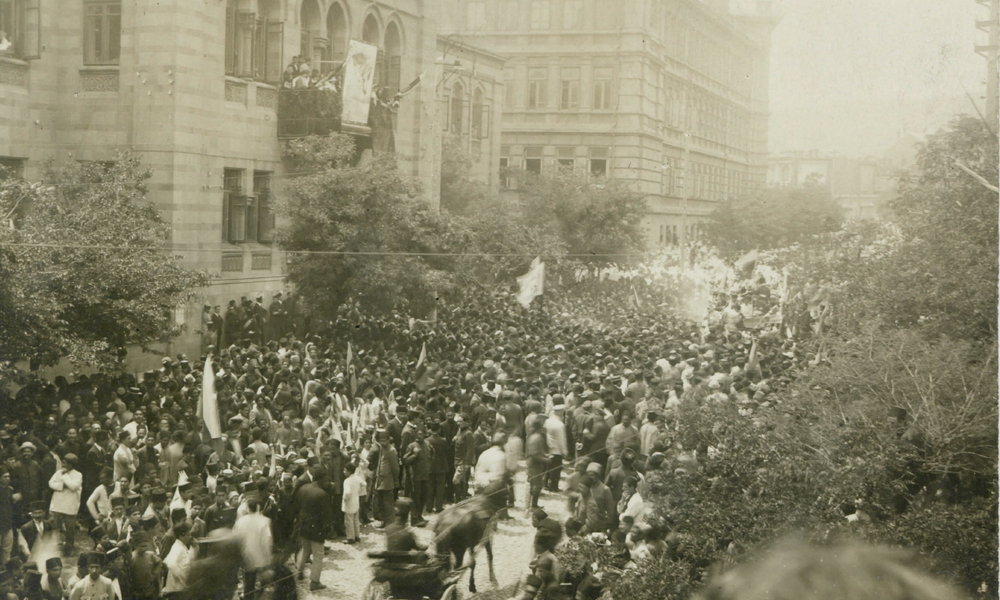
First anniversary of independence on Istiglaliyyat Street, Baku, May 28, 1919

Independence Day (Azerbaijani: Müstəqillik Günü) is a national holiday in Azerbaijan marking the anniversary of the founding of the Azerbaijan Democratic Republic (ADR) on 28 May 1918. Since 1990, Republic Day is celebrated as a national holiday in Azerbaijan.

Until 2021, it was marked as Republic Day. In October 2021, it was renamed and became Independence Day.

== History of Independence Day ==
The Russian Empire was overthrown by the short-lived February Revolution in 1917. The national movement of people who were trampled by the tyranny existed in the country started. On 28 May 1918 the Azerbaijan Democratic Republic (1918–1920), the first secular democratic state in the Muslim East was proclaimed. The Azerbaijan Democratic Republic, founded by Mammad Amin Rasulzadeh, was the first parliamentary republic and the first democratic, legal and secular state in the Turkic and Islamic world.

First flag of the Azerbaijan Democratic Republic, 24 July-9 November 1918.

Flag of the Azerbaijan Democratic Republic and the Republic of Azerbaijan.

Among the important accomplishments of the ADR was the extension of suffrage to women, making Azerbaijan one of the first countries in the world, and the very first majority-Muslim nation, to grant women equal political rights with men. The first state, which officially recognized the Azerbaijan Democratic Republic was the Ottoman Empire. That historic event took place on 4 June 1918. On 9 November 1918 on the basis of the proposal by Mammad Amin Rasulzadeh the three-color flag of the Azerbaijan Democratic Republic was adopted.

Until then the flag of the Azerbaijan Democratic Republic was red. The Azerbaijan Democratic Republic was able to operate in a tense and complicated socio-political situation for only 23 months. The Soviet Union invaded Azerbaijan on 28 April 1920. Though the idea of independence was not defeated, and in 1991, after the collapse of the Soviet Union, Azerbaijan again declared its independence.

=== Declaration of Independence ===
Declaration of Independence of Azerbaijan
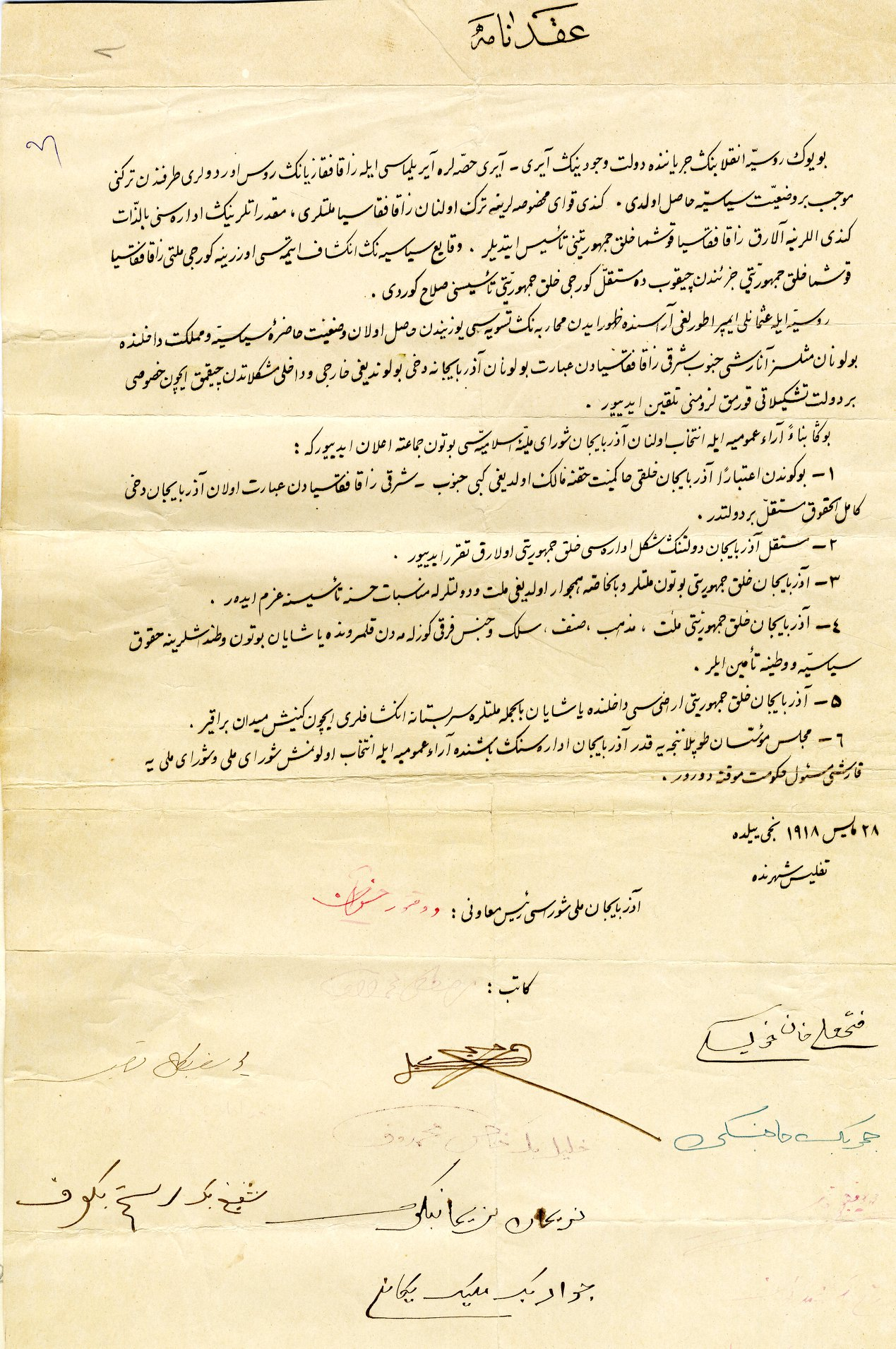
- Original text of the Declaration in Azerbaijani
- Created: 28 May 1918
- Location: National Museum of History of Azerbaijan
- Signatories: Hasan bey Aghayev, Fatali Khan Khoyski, Nasib Yusifbeyli, Jamo bey Hajinski, Shafi bey Rustambeyli, Nariman bey Narimanbeyov, Javad Malik-Yeganov and Mustafa Mahmudov
- Purpose: To announce the independence of Azerbaijan

Azerbaijan declared independence from Russian Empire in Tiflis on 28 May 1918.

The Azerbaijan Democratic Republic was founded by the Azerbaijani National Council in Tiflis on 28 May 1918 after the collapse of the Russian Empire that began with the Russian Revolution of 1917. The Muslim representation in the defunct Transcaucasian Seim had constituted itself into the Azerbaijani National Council, and on 28 May 1918 proclaimed that a new nation was born. So far only a geographical reference, Azerbaijan now became the name of a state, and some 2 million people, called variously Tatars, Transcaucasian Muslims, and Caucasian Turks, officially became Azerbaijanis.

== Celebrations ==
One year after the founding of the ADR, a military parade on the site of the Azerbaijan Carpet Museum took place on Republic Day. The first jubilee celebrations in honor of the holiday took place in 1998. This events were widely celebrated in accordance with the decree “On the Celebration of the 80th Anniversary of the Democratic Republic of Azerbaijan” that was signed by President Heydar Aliyev on 30 January 1998. On 26 May, President Aliyev delivered a speech to the National Assembly and a day later, he delivered a gala speech in honor of the occasion. In 2001, Patriarch Alexy II of Moscow visited the country for the first time to attend the Republic Day celebrations. In 2008, a postage stamp was issued in connection with the 90th anniversary of the Republic.

=== Locations ===
In honor of this day the station of the Baku underground is named. Initially, it was called "April 28", since on 28 April 1920, Soviet power was established in Azerbaijan, and the ADR ceased to exist. However, after the Republic gained independence for the second time, the name, reminiscent of the Soviet past, was replaced by "May 28". It was enough to rename only letters, the numbers remained the same.

== Gallery ==
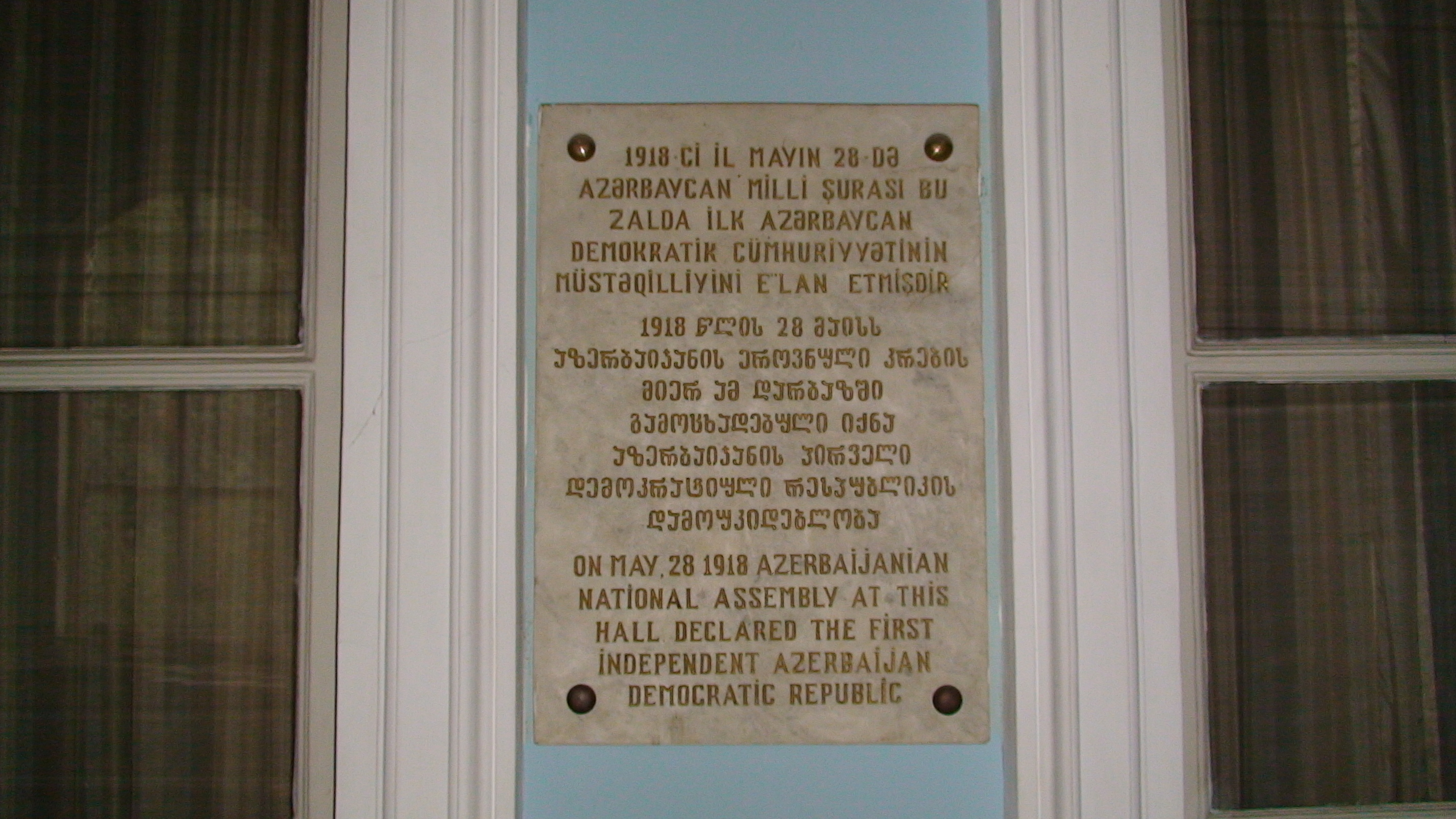
Plaque commemorating the establishment of the Azerbaijan Democratic Republic

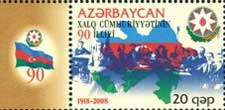
Stamp of Azerbaijan

== See also ==
- Flag of Azerbaijan
