= Mehić =

Mehić is South-Slavic patronymic surname derived from the given name Meho (variation of Mehmetd). Notable people include:

- Damir Mehić (born 1987), Bosnian-born Swedish footballer
- David Mehić (born 1997), Serbian volleyball player
- Sead Mehić (born 1975), Bosnian footballer

== See also ==
- Mehmedović
