= Sultan Majid Ganizade =

Azerbaijani writer and politician (1866–1938)

- Sultan Məcid Qənizadə
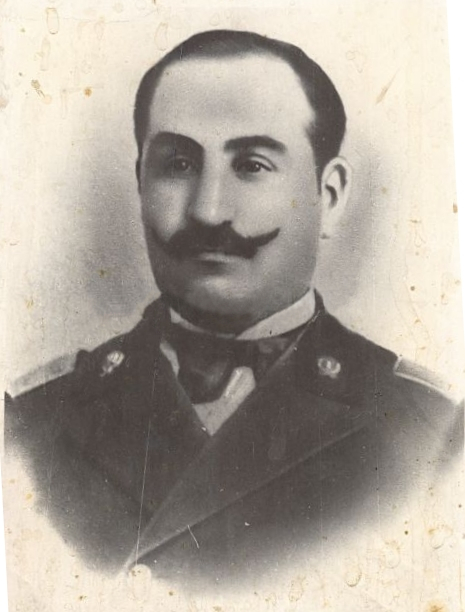
- Born: Sultan Məcid Murtuzəli oğlu Qənizadə; 1866; Shamakhi, Baku Governorate, Russian Empire
- Died: 22 March 1938 (aged 71–72); Baku, Azerbaijan SSR, Soviet Union
- Occupations: Writer, educator, playwright, theatre director, politician, translator
- Writing career
- Language: Azerbaijani
- Genres: Fiction, drama, satire
- Notable works: Letters of Sheyda-bek Shirvani, Fear of God, Goncha Khanum

Sultan Majid Ganizade (Azerbaijani: Sultan Məcid Murtuzəli oğlu Qənizadə; 1866 – 22 March 1938) was an Azerbaijani writer, educator, playwright, theatre figure, translator, and politician. He was active in the educational and cultural life of Azerbaijan, served as a deputy of the Parliament of the Azerbaijan Democratic Republic, and was later a theorist of public education in Soviet Azerbaijan.

== Biography ==
Ganizade was born in 1866 in Shamakhi, in a merchant family. He was a grandson of the poet Agha Masih Shirvani. He graduated from the real school in Shamakhi and in 1887 completed the Alexandrov Teachers' Institute in Tbilisi.

In 1887, together with Habib bey Mahmudbeyov, Ganizade opened the first Russo-Tatar public school in Baku and served as its director. He later worked as an inspector of public schools in the Baku Governorate and Dagestan Oblast.

In 1888, Ganizade, together with Habib bey Mahmudbeyov and N. Veliyev, organized a permanent Azerbaijani theatre troupe in Baku and became one of its directors. In 1897, he brought actor Huseyn Arablinski into the troupe.

Ganizade was the author of the novel Letters of Sheyda-bek Shirvani (1898–1900), the novella Fear of God (1906), and other works that depicted the hardships of ordinary life and criticized social injustice and ignorance. His dramatic works included Goncha Khanum, also known as The Lady of Binam, the comedy Evening Sneezing for Benefit (1904), and the vaudevilles Dursunali Ballybady (1904), Khor-khor (1905), Take It, but Remember (1908), and Self-Sacrifice.

Azerbaijani writers of the late 19th century. Seated, right to left: Qurbanali Sharifzade, Sultan Majid Ganizade, Jalil Mammadguluzadeh, and Aliskandar Jafarzade. Standing, right to left: Omar Faig Nemanzadeh and Hamzat bey Gabulov-Shirvani.

Ganizade translated Russian, Georgian, and Armenian classics into Azerbaijani. In 1902 he compiled a Russo-Tatar dictionary, and in 1904 an Azerbaijani phraseological dictionary. He also translated Leo Tolstoy's play The First Distiller into Azerbaijani.

In late 1917, Ganizade was elected to the Russian Constituent Assembly from the Transcaucasian electoral district. In 1917, he was a member and one of the leaders of the Ittihad Party. He was also a member of the Transcaucasian Sejm and the Azerbaijan National Council. He later served as a deputy of the Parliament of the Azerbaijan Democratic Republic, where he belonged to the Ittihad faction.

After the Soviet takeover of Azerbaijan in 1920, Ganizade emigrated for a period and later returned to the Soviet Union. He was arrested in June 1936. In March 1938, an NKVD troika sentenced him to death. He was executed during the night of 21–22 March 1938. He was later rehabilitated posthumously.

== Selected works ==
- Letters of Sheyda-bek Shirvani
- Fear of God
- Goncha Khanum
- Evening Sneezing for Benefit (1904)
- Dursunali Ballybady (1904)
- Khor-khor (1905)
- Take It, but Remember (1908)
- Selected Works (Baku, 1965)
