= Asad bey Amirov =

Azerbaijani politician (1889–1939)

- Born: 1889; Shusha, Azerbaijan
- Died: 1939 (aged 49–50); Baku, USSR
- Occupation: politician

Asad bey Amirov (Azerbaijani: Əsəd bəy Əmirov; 1889, Shusha- 1939, Baku) was a Member of the Parliament of the Azerbaijan Democratic Republic and the Ittihad Faction.

== Life ==
Asad bey Amirov was born in 1889 in Shusha. He is a graduate of the Transcaucasian Teachers' Seminary.

Amirov was elected a member of the Parliament of the Azerbaijan Democratic Republic on April 24, 1919, as a member of the Ittihad Party. Amirov was a member of the Ittihad faction in the parliament. He was also a member of the Baku City Public Office.

Amirov was a member of the Ittihad Party. On April 10, 1919, the first congress of the Ittihad Party was held. 300 congress representatives were invited to the congress held in the building of the Baku City Office. At the congress, Amirov was elected a member of the 22-member Central Committee of the Ittihad Party.

On January 25, 1920, at 1 o'clock, the Second Congress of the Ittihad Party was held in the hall of the Baku Public Assembly. A total of 1,000 congress delegates attended the congress. At the 4-day congress, Amirov was directly elected a member of the Central Committee as a member of parliament.

In April 1920, the Azerbaijan Democratic Republic was occupied by the Bolsheviks. Shortly afterwards, all political parties ceased to exist.

== See also ==
- Ittihad

== Sources ==
- Seyidov, Ahmed (1998). Qori Seminariyası və onun məzunları. Baku: Maarif.
- Азербайджанская Демократическая Республика: 1918–1920: законодательные акты]. Baku: Azərbaycan. 1998.
- Azərbaycan Xalq Cümhuriyyəti (1918–1920), Parlament (Stenoqrafik hesabatlar). Vol. I]. Baku: Azərbaycan. 1998.

Asadov, Oktay (2008). Azərbaycan Respublikasının Parlamenti. Baku: Şərq-Qərb.

- Azərbaycan Xalq Cümhuriyyəti (1918–1920), Parlament (Stenoqrafik hesabatlar). Vol. II]. Baku: Azərbaycan. 1998.
- Azerbaijan Democratic Republic: 1918–1920: legislative acts. Azerbaijan Publishing House. 1998.
