= Mir Hidayat bey Seyidov =

Azerbaijani politician (1887–1919)

Mir Hidayat bey Seyidov Mir Hidayət bəy Seyidov
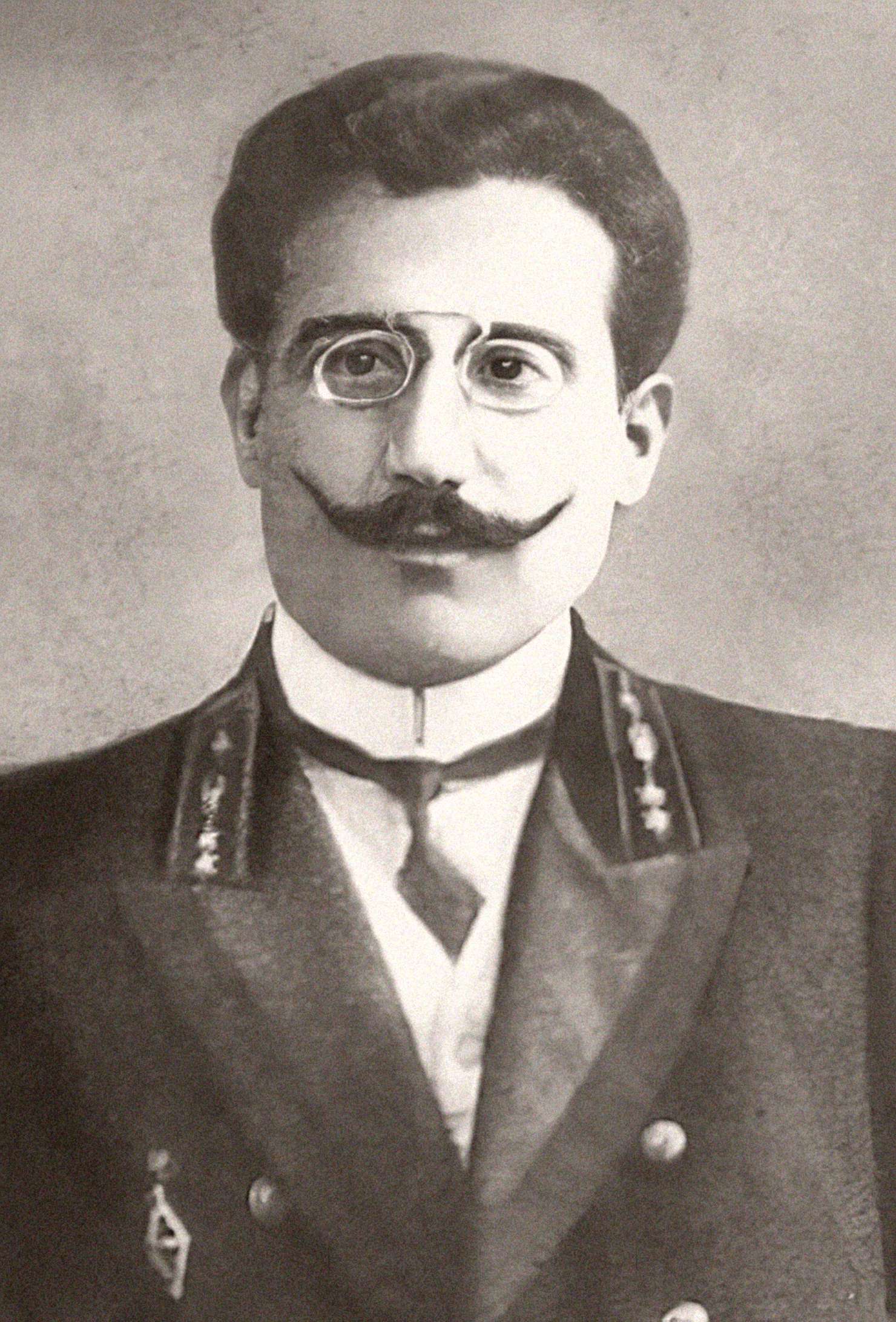

Member of the Parliament of the Azerbaijan Democratic Republic
- In office December 7, 1918 – February 5, 1919

Member of the National Council of the Azerbaijan Democratic Republic
- In office May 27, 1918 – December 7, 1918

Personal details
- Born: April 2, 1887 Ganja, Russian Empire
- Died: February 23, 1919 (aged 31) Ordubad, Nakhchivan uezd, Azerbaijan Republic
- Party: Musavat

Mir Hidayat bey Seyidov (April 2, 1887, Yelizavetpol - February 23, 1919, Ordubad, Nakhchivan district) was an Azerbaijani political figure, a member of the All-Russian Constituent Assembly, deputy chairman of the National Council of the Azerbaijan Democratic Republic.

He was the chairman of the Muslim National Council of Iravan and Nakhchivan governorates.

== Life ==
Mir Hidayat bey Mir Adil oglu was born in 1887 in Ganja. After graduating from Ganja gymnasium in 1906, he entered Kazan University and began to study law there. However, in 1907, he was arrested and expelled from the university, accused of being a member of the Eser's revolutionary group. He was released after applying for amnesty three times. Then he returned to Azerbaijan.

After the Russians occupied Erzurum in 1914, Mir Hidayat Bey Seyidov organized the people of Azerbaijan and sent help for the defense of Erzurum for several years.

He became the chairman of the Muslim National Council of Iravan and Nakhchivan governorates. Later, he went to Tiflis and became a member of the Muslim Faction in the Transcaucasian Seym.

He was the deputy chairman of the National Council of the Azerbaijan Democratic Republic established on May 27, 1918. He represented the Musavat party in the parliament of the Republic of Azerbaijan. He is one of the 3 council members who voted against the decision to transfer Yerevan to Armenia.

From 1918, he returned here to prevent Dashnaks from attacking Nakhchivan and took part in the defense of Ordubad, chairing the Ordubad National Defense Council.

He died in Ordubad on February 23, 1919. There is no information about the circumstances and how he died. At the 20th session of the Parliament of the Azerbaijan Democratic Republic on March 6, 1919, information about his death was announced.

== Family ==
Mir Hidayat bey Seyidov's father, Mir Adil bey was the grandson of Qudsi Vanandi. Mir Adil Bey's father Haji Mir Agha Bey is the second son of Qudsi Vanandi.

Mir Hidayat Bey started a family life with Shavket Khanim Kazymbeyova.

His daughter Dilara Seyidova became an architect.

His son Adil Seyidov worked at the Institute of Geology of the Azerbaijan National Academy of Sciences. He taught at Azerbaijan State University. He died in 1999.
