= Makhmutov =

Makhmutov (Russian: Ма́хмутов), feminine: Makhmutova is a patronymic surname slavicised from the given name Mahmud. Notable people with the surname include:

- Aleksandr Makhmutov
- Marat Makhmutov (born 1975), Russian footballer
- Ruslan Makhmutov (born 1991), Russian footballer

== See also ==
- Makhmudov
