= Heybatgulu Mammadbayov =

Azerbaijani statesman

Heybatgulu Mammadbayov Heybətqulu Məmmədbəyov

State Controller (ADR)
- In office 22 December 1919 – 1 April 1920
- President: Nasib Yusifbeyli; Prime Minister, (Chairman of Azerbaijani Parliament)
- Preceded by: Nariman bey Narimanbeyov
- Succeeded by: office terminated

Heybatgulu Mammadbayov (Azerbaijani: Heybətqulu Məmmədbəyov) was an Azerbaijani statesman who served as State Controller in the fifth cabinet of Azerbaijan Democratic Republic, and was member of Parliament of Azerbaijan.

In 1918, Mammadbayov was a member of Azerbaijani National Council which proclaimed independence of Azerbaijan Democratic Republic on 28 May 1918.

On 22 December 1919, when the fifth government under the leadership of Prime Minister Nasib Yusifbeyli was formed, Mammadbayov was appointed the State Controller.

== See also ==
- Azerbaijani National Council
- Cabinets of Azerbaijan Democratic Republic (1918-1920)
- Current Cabinet of Azerbaijan Republic
