= Mehmedović =

Mehmedović is a Bosnian surname meaning "son of Mehmed". Notable people with the surname include:

- Ersin Mehmedović (born 1981), Serbian footballer
- Damir Mehmedovic (born 1997), Austrian footballer
- Hatidža Mehmedović (1952–2018), Bosnian human rights activist
- Majda Mehmedović (born 1990), Montenegrin handball player
- Sasha Mehmedovic (born 1985), Canadian judoka
- Zehrudin Mehmedović (born 1998), Serbian footballer
