= Mustafa Mahmudov =

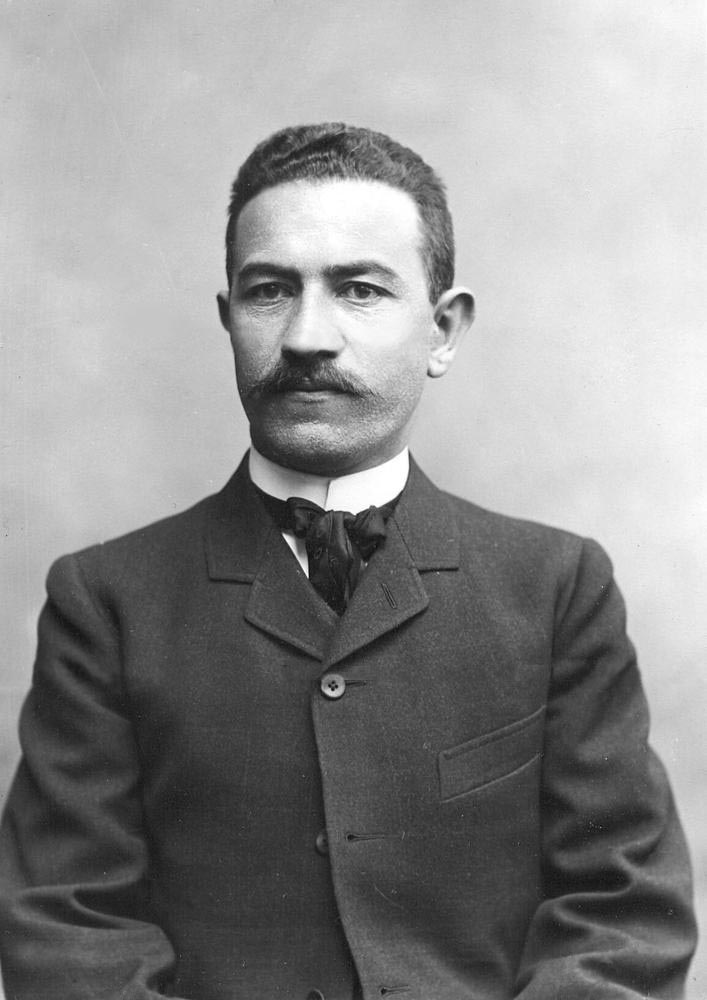

Member of Azerbaijani Parliament representing Göyçay
- In office 27 May 1918 – 28 April 1920

Member of the Sejm of Transcaucasian Democratic Federative Republic
- In office 9 February 1918 – 16 May 1918

Member of Second Duma
- In office 6 February 1907 – October 1907

Personal details
- Born: January 31, 1878 Kürdəmir, Baku Governorate, Russian Empire
- Died: December 20, 1937 (aged 59) Baku, Azerbaijan SSR, USSR
- Citizenship: Russian Empire; Azerbaijan Democratic Republic; USSR
- Party: CDP (until 1917); Musavat
- Education: Transcaucasian Teachers Seminary

Mustafa Mahmudov (Azerbaijani: Mustafa Hacı Musa oğlu Mahmudov) was an Azerbaijani political leader who was instrumental in the nation's independence movement in the early 1900s. He served as a member of parliament for the second Russian State Duma in 1907 and was Deputy Secretary of the Azerbaijani National Council at its initiation in 1918. Mahmudov also was a member of Azerbaijan's Commission on Agriculture. He represented the Musavat political party.

== Early life and education ==
He was born on 31 January 1878, in Kürdəmir village of Baku Governorate into a peasant family. He received primary education in Kürdəmir and Göyçay, finally enrolling at prestigious Transcaucasian Teachers Seminary, graduating from it in 1899.

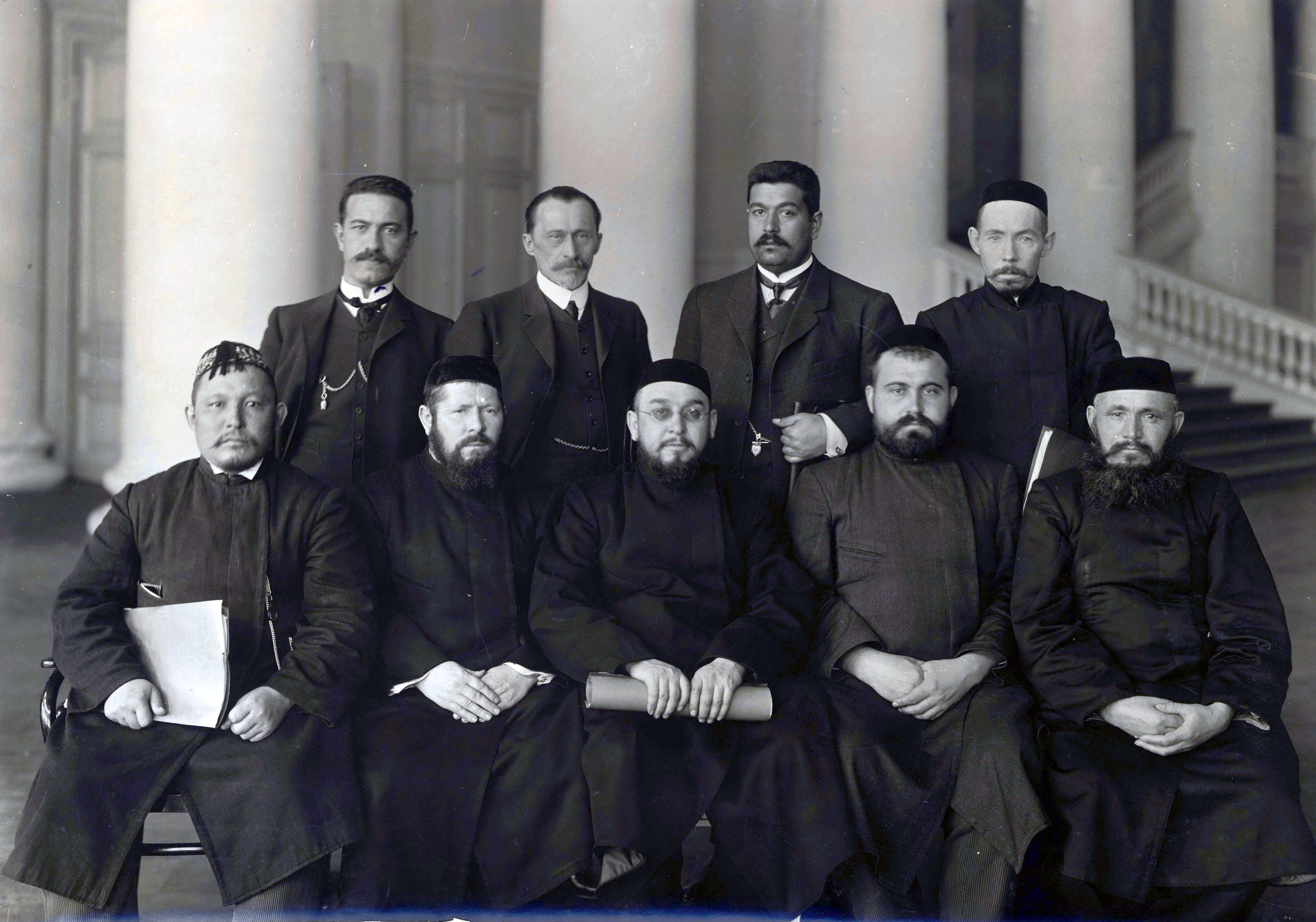
Mustafa Mahmudov (standing, first from left) among Muslim members of Second Duma of Russia

== Career ==
He started his career as a teacher, first working as a school instructor in Vəndam, then moving on to Baku city, working at several schools. Losing his elder brother in 1903, he was forced to look after his children too. He switched to politics in 1907 when he was elected to Second Duma of Russian Empire representing the Baku Governorate from the CDP. An activist for abolition of drumhead courts-martial in Russian Empire, he accused Minister of Education, Piotr von Kauffman of neglecting empire's Muslim citizens' education, treating them like a caste.

He briefly returned to pedagogy in 1910 before switching to Musavat and getting elected to Sejm of Transcaucasian Democratic Federative Republic on 9 February 1918. He was Deputy Secretary of the Azerbaijani National Council prior to dissolution of fragile Transcaucasian DFR. He later became member of succeeding Azerbaijani Parliament from 1918 till the end of republic in 1920. He continued teaching career through 1929 and 1934 until his death. He was executed on 20 December 1937 during Great Purge.
