= Parliament of the Azerbaijan Democratic Republic =

Governing body

Parliament of the Azerbaijan Democratic Republic Azərbaycan Xalq Cümhuriyyəti Parlamenti

Type
- Type: Unicameral

History
- Established: December 7, 1918
- Disbanded: April 1920
- Preceded by: Azerbaijani National Council
- Succeeded by: Supreme Soviet of the Azerbaijan SSR

Leadership
- Speaker of the Parliament: Alimardan bey Topchubashov

Structure
- Seats: 120 (April 27, 1920)
- Political groups: Political Parties (91): Musavat (39); Ittihad (13); Socialists (12); Slavic Alliance (9); Dashnaktsutyun (7); Ahrar (6); Armenian Fraction (5); Ethnic minorities (5); Independents (7): Independents (3); Left Independent (1); Unaffiliated (3); Vacant (17): Vacant (17)

Meeting place
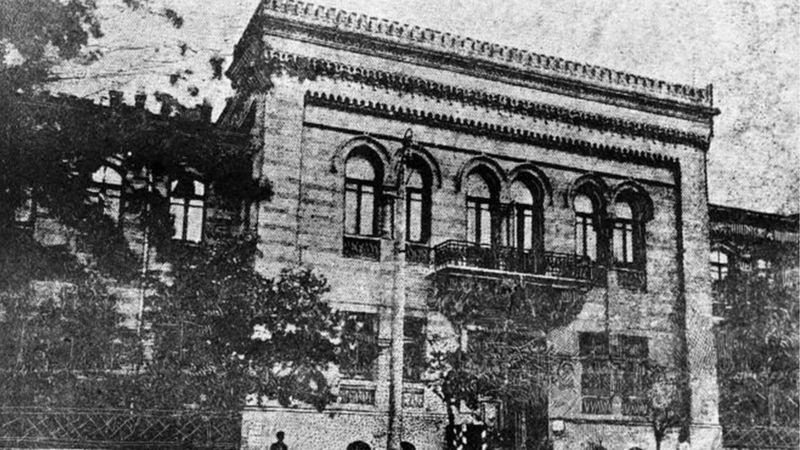
- Building of the Parliament
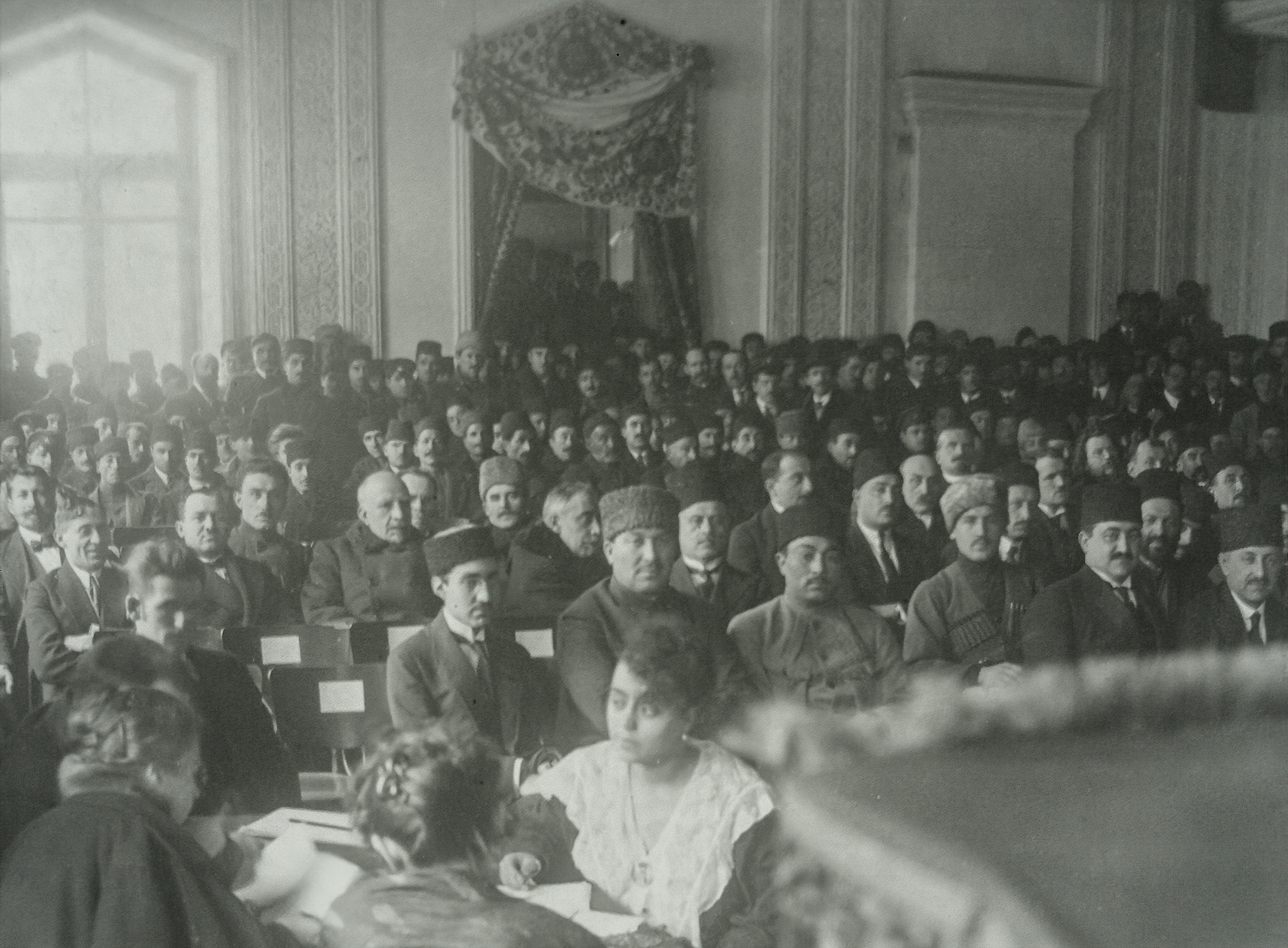
- Session of the Parliament

The Parliament of the Azerbaijan Democratic Republic (Azerbaijani: Azərbaycan Xalq Cümhuriyyəti Parlamenti) was the legislative branch of the Azerbaijan Democratic Republic. It was the parliament of the first parliamentary republic in the Caucasus Region of Central Asia. It parliament was established on December 7, 1918 when Azerbaijan declared independence away from the short-lived Transcaucasian Democratic Federative Republic. The parliament disbanded in April of 1920 after the Red Army took control of Baku.

== History ==
=== Azerbaijani National Council ===
On May 28, 1918, the Azerbaijani Muslim faction of the Transcaucasian Seym declared itself to be the Azerbaijani National Council., the governing body of the new Azerbaijan Democratic Republic. This was the first parliament in the history of Azerbaijan. As stated in the Declaration of Independence,

"Until the convening of the Constituent Assembly, Azerbaijan is headed by the National Council elected by the people and the Provisional Government, which is responsible to the National Council."

On September 17, 1918, three months after the formation of Fatali Khan Khoyski's cabinet, the government of the Azerbaijan Democratic Republic moved to Baku. Fatali khan Khoyski began preparations for the convening of the Constituent Assembly. . At his suggestion, the National Council undertook to convene the Constituent Assembly.

On November 19, 1918, the National Council decreed all nationalities in Azerbaijan should be represented in parliament. At that time, the country had a population of 2,750,000. Of these, 1,900,000 were Azerbaijani Muslims, 500,000 were Armenians, and 230,000 were Russians.

The 120 seats in the new parliament were to be apportioned among all the ethnic and political groups.

- Azerbaijan Muslims - 80
- Armenians - 21,
- Russians - 10

Out of 21 Armenian representatives, eight were to be elected from Ganja, eight from Shusha and five from Baku. The 10 Russian representatives were given to the Russian National Council, -1 to the German National Organization, -1 to the Jewish National Council, 1 to the Georgian Committee and -1 to the Polish Committee. The Council also provided for the sending of three representatives by the Baku Trade Union Council and two representatives by the Baku Industry and Trade. Members of parliament had parliamentary immunity.

The Council also decided to include 44 Turkish Muslim representatives elected to the All-Russian Constituent Assembly in late 1917 in the new parliament. The remaining 36 Muslim deputies and representatives of other nationalities had to be re-elected. The formation of the new Parliament was to be completed on December 3, 1918.

On November 29, 1918, signed by Rasulzade the application was published. The appeal stated:

Citizens! War and revolution during the emergency condition, considering the strike, which has the Suraiya-team iqtizai time to reconnect with Baku, Azerbaijan collected. Suraiya-team first adopted the law only the Muslims belonging to Suraiya-Milli national picture from the state was to take a picture. According to the law adopted on the 19th of this month, the National Council will become a 120-member Majlis-Mabusan (Parliament) by December 3. Lawyers from the country's provinces were invited to the meeting, as well as representatives from minority nations. The prisoner who will be gathered in this way will be the owner of our country, will decide its destiny, organize its government and defend its interests until the Assembly of the Azerbaijani Parliament convenes in the future by a general election method... let us put aside enmity and discord that give us nothing but disaster and misery. History has forced us all to live together. Let's build our lives on a rational and humane basis, love and respect each other so that we can easily bear the natural hardships of a new life. Despite national and religious differences, all Azerbaijani citizens are children of the same country. They must reach out and help each other to build a common life in a common homeland and achieve their happiness together.

=== Opening of parliament ===
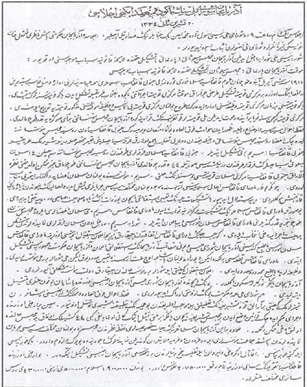
Law on the Establishment of the Parliament, 1918

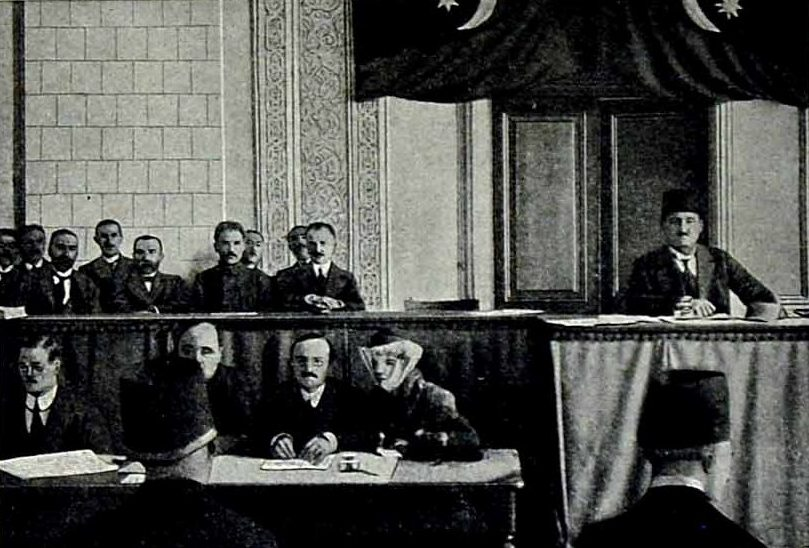
Opening of the Parliament of the Azerbaijan Democratic Republic, 7 December 1918

On December 7, 1918, at one o'clock in the afternoon, the Azerbaijani Parliament opened in the building of Haji Zeynalabdin Tagiyev's former girls' school on Nikolayev Street. Chairman of the National Council of Azerbaijan Mohammad Amin Rasulzadeh delivered a congratulatory speech.At the suggestion of the Musavat faction, Alimardan bey Topchubashov was elected chairman of the parliament, and Dr. Hasan bey Agayev was elected his first deputy. As Topchubashov was at the Paris Peace Conference, Agayev headed the activities of the parliament.

At the first session of parliament, the resignation of the Khoyski government was accepted and F. Khoisky was called to form a new government. On December 26, 1918, F. Khoisky addressed the parliament with his program and submitted his new government for approval. The parliament adopted the government's program and expressed confidence in the new government.

=== Russian and Armenian boycotts ===
None of Russian delegates to Parliament attended the opening session of parliament. The Baku Russian National Council, controlling the Russian delegates, declared that the Parliament had no moral right to speak on behalf of the Russian population in Azerbaijan. They tried to prove that Azerbaijan had violated the idea of a "united and indivisible Russia" in declaring its independence. Allegedly, the participation of the Russian National Council in the Parliament and the Government would mean "recognition of the fact of separation of Azerbaijan from Russia", which facilitated the recognition of Azerbaijan in the international arena. However, not all Russians in Azerbaijan supported the Russian boycott of Parliament. The Russian-Slavic Society in Baku appealed to Rasulzade to allow the representatives of this society to "enter the Parliament" in order to participate in "general state-building" in Azerbaijan.

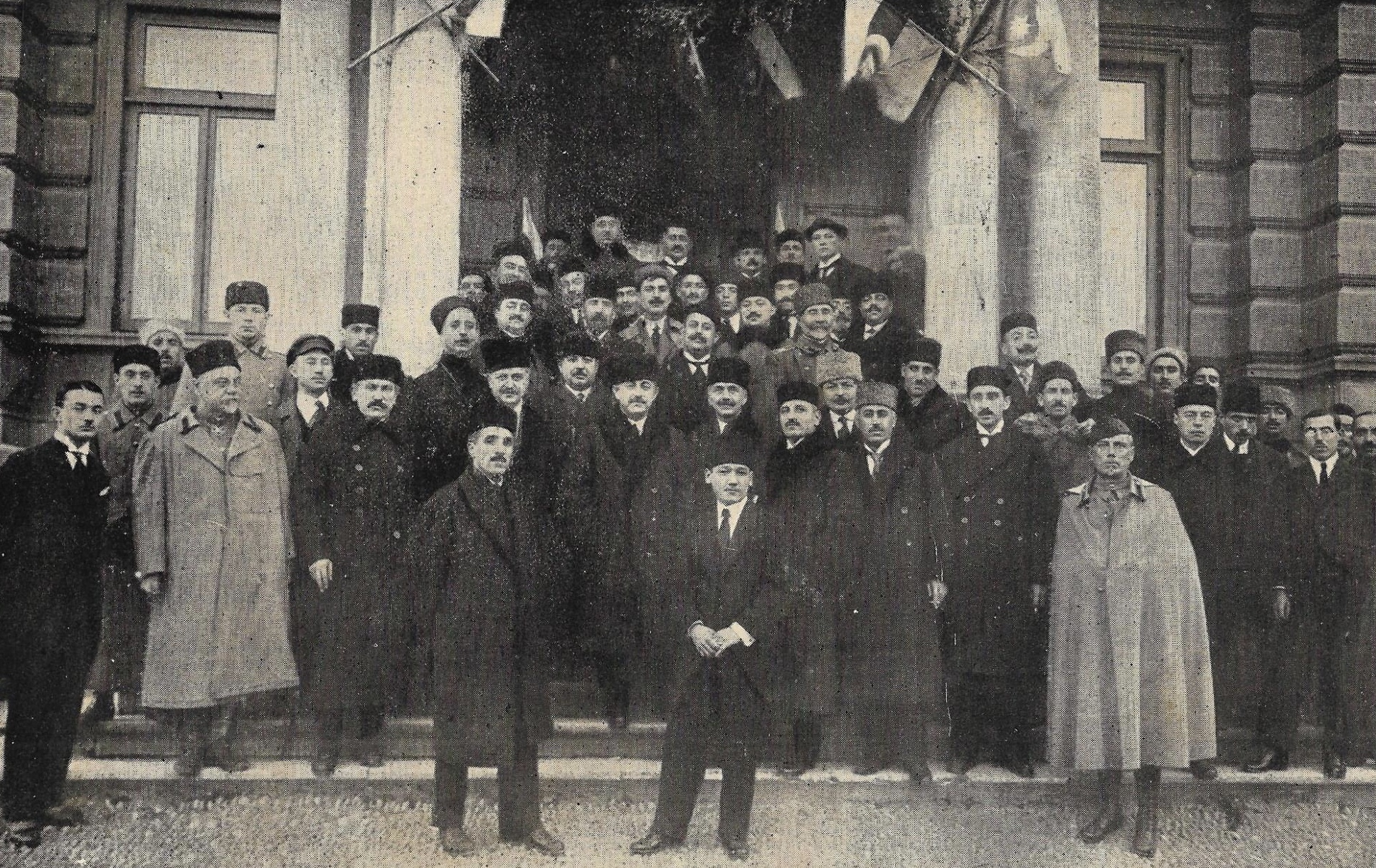
Members of the Parliament of the Azerbaijan Democratic Republic, 1920

The Armenians delegates boycotted the opening session and other sessions for the next two months. Finally, they decided to participate. They create two factions in parliament - the Armenian and the Dashnaktsutyun. It was said that the Armenians only wanted to use parliament to promote their goal of a Greater Armenia. In the meantime, existence of 11 factions and groups in Parliament created a fractured legislature. For example, the Socialist Bloc of Parliament, under the guise of "protecting the interests of the poor", regularly promoted the annexation of Azerbaijan by the Soviet Union. They later succeeded in opening a diplomatic mission in Moscow, and finally advocated the intervention of the Red Army in Azerbaijan.

== Adoption of laws ==
More than 270 bills were submitted to the parliament, about 230 of which were adopted.

There were 11 commissions in the parliament: Finance and Budget, Legislative Proposals, Central Commission for Elections to the Constituent Assembly, Mandate, Military, Agrarian Issues: Commissions on Inquiries, Command and Control on the Use of the Country's Productive Forces, Editorial and Labor Commissions.

The activities of the Parliament were governed by a charter specially prepared for this purpose - the "Instruction (instruction) of the Parliament of Azerbaijan."

Rasulzade assessed the activity of the Parliament of the Azerbaijan Democratic Republic as follows:

The National Assembly represented all classes and nations of the country and completely ruled the fate of the state. Without it, no orders would pass, no expenses would be incurred, no war would break out, no peace would be signed. The government stays when it gains the confidence of the parliament and falls when it loses it. There was no means to rule in the middle. It was the absolute power of the parliament.

— Mammad Amin Rasulzade

== The end of the Parliament ==
On the night of April 26-27, 1920, units from the 11th Red Army crossed into Azerbaijan and laid siege to Baku. Baku was also besieged by Soviet units from the Caspian Sea. The next morning, armed groups of communists seized important facilities both inside and outside the city.

A delegation of communists acting on behalf of the Soviets issued an ultimatum to hand over power to the Azerbaijani Parliament. This delegation represented the Central Committee of the Azerbaijani Communist (Bolshevik) Party and Baku bureau of the Caucasus Committee of the Russian Communist (Bolsheviks). Mammad Hasan Hajinski, who had close ties with the Azerbaijani Bolsheviks, held talks with the Communists.

The ultimatum and the results of the commission's negotiations were discussed at the final session of parliament chaired by Mammad Yusif Jafarov. The meeting started at 20.45 on April 27 and lasted until 23.25. During the session, Rasulzade asked to open the doors of the Parliament to the general public. In his speech, Rasulzadeh said:

Gentlemen! Let's do not make our historic decision without the knowledge of the nation. Let's leave the door of the country's Parliament open so that everyone knows what a dangerous situation we are in and what decision we will make. Therefore, I propose not to close the doors of our parliament to the nation and not to make decisions without the knowledge of the nation.

— Mammad Amin Rasulzade

Hajinski told parliament that if they did not transfer power to the communists tonight, the local communist party would call in the Red Army. The Communists also warned that all the political parties would be banned. Hajinski also said that the Communists refused to consider any proposals from parliament and warned the members about the consequences.. At the end of his speech, Hajinski called on the members of Parliament to make the only right decision in the current situation "for the salvation of the nation".

Samad agha Agamalioglu, Gara bey Garabeyov, Aslan bey Safikurdski, Rasulzade and Sultanmajid Ganizade expressed their support for the transfer of power to the Communists only under certain conditions. The Parliament decided by a majority vote to hand over power on the following terms:

- The full independence of Azerbaijan, ruled by the Soviet government, is preserved;
- The government formed by the Communist Party of Azerbaijan will be a temporary body;
- The final form of government of Azerbaijan shall be determined by the supreme legislative body of Azerbaijan in the person of the Soviets of Workers', Peasants' and Soldiers' Deputies, independent of any external pressure;
- All government employees remain in office, but those in positions of responsibility are replaced;
- The newly formed Provisional Communist Government guarantees the inviolability of the life and property of members of Parliament and Government;
- Measures will be taken to prevent the Red Army from entering Baku by battle;
- The new government will take decisive measures at its disposal against all foreign forces seeking to undermine Azerbaijan's independence, no matter where it takes place.

== Elections ==
Is the stenographic record of the Parliament of the Republic of Azerbaijan reports that the elections will be hidden and Muslim Majlis-Məbusana the parliament members, in addition to the 44 people who are part of the National Council elected 36 new members. The proportion of members to be involved was as follows:

- Baku - 5
- Goychay district, Baku province - 2 (one city, one district).
- Javad district, Baku province - 2 (one city, one district).
- Guba district, Baku province - 3 (one city, two districts)
- Lankaran district, Baku province - 2 (one city, one district).
- Shamakhi district, Baku province - 2
- Ganja - 3 (one city, two accidents).
- Arash district, Yelizavetpol province - 2 (one city, one district).
- Javanshir district, Yelizavetpol province – 1
- Zangazur district, Yelizavetpol province - 2
- Gazakh district, Yelizavetpol province - 1
- Jabrayil district, Yelizavetpol province - 1
- Nukha district, Yelizavetpol province - 2 (one city, one district).
- Shusha district, Yelizavetpol province - 2 (one city, one district).
- Zagatala district - 2 (one city, one district).
- The part of Iravan region passing to Azerbaijan - 3
- The part of Tbilisi region passing to Azerbaijan – 1

From the Armenian minority population - 21 members: 8 from Ganja Armenian Population Committee, 8 from Shusha Armenian Population Committee, 5 from Baku Armenian Population Committee;

- - from the Russian population from the Russian National Council in Baku - 10;
- - Organizational-nationality of the German population - 1;
- - Jewish National Council - 1;
- - from the Georgian committee - 1;
- - from the Polish Committee - 1;
- - Baku Trade Union Council - 3;
- - Jointly with Baku Soviet Congress and Trade and Industrial Societies - 2.

== Governments of the Azerbaijan Democratic Republic ==
=== First cabinet: 28 May 1918 – 17 June 1918 ===
- The Chairman of the Council of Ministers and Minister of Interior - Fatali khan Khoyski (neutral).
- Military Minister - Khosrov Pasha bey Sultanov (Musavat).
- Minister of Foreign Affairs - Mammadhasan Hajinski (Musavat).
- Minister of Finance and Public Education - Nasib bey Yusifbeyli (Musavat).
- Minister of Justice - Khalil bey Khasmammadov (Musavat).
- Minister of Trade and Industry - Mammad Yusif Jafarov (neutral, then - Musavat).
- Minister of Agriculture and Labor - Akbar aga Sheikhulislamov (Hummat).
- Minister of Roads, Post and Telegraph - Khudadat bey Malik-Aslanov (neutral).
- State Inspector - Jamo bey Hajinski (socialist).

=== Second cabinet: 17 June 1918 – 07 December 1918 ===
- Chairman of the Council of Ministers and Minister of Justice - Fatali khan Khoyski (neutral).
- Minister of Foreign Affairs - Mammadhasan Hajinski (Musavat).
- Minister of Public Education and Religious Affairs - Nasib bey Yusifbeyli (Musavat).
- Minister of Internal Affairs - Behbud khan Javanshir (neutral).
- Minister of Agriculture - Khosrov Pasha bey Sultanov (Musavat).
- Minister of Health and Social Welfare - Khudadat bey Rafibeyli (neutral).
- Minister of Roads - Khudadat bey Malik-Aslanov (neutral).
- Minister of Trade and Industry, Minister of Food - Aga Ashurov (neutral).
- Minister of Finance - Abdulali bey Amirjanov (neutral).
- Minister without portfolio - Alimardan bey Topchubashov (neutral).
- Minister without portfolio - Musa bey Rafiyev (Musavat).
- Minister without portfolio - Khalil bey Khasmammadov (Musavat).

=== Cabinet changes 6 June 1918 ===
- Chairman of the Council of Ministers - Fatali khan Khoyski (neutral).
- Minister of Trade, Industry and Internal Affairs - Behbud khan Javanshir (neutral).
- Minister of Foreign Affairs - Alimardan bey Topchubashov (neutral).
- Minister of Finance - Mammadhasan Hajinski (Musavat).
- Minister of Public Education - Nasib bey Yusifbeyli (Musavat).
- Minister of Roads - Khalil bey Khasmammadov (neutral).
- Minister of Agriculture - Khosrov Pasha bey Sultanov (Musavat).
- Minister of Public Health - Khudadat bey Rafibeyli (neutral).
- Minister of Post and Telegraph - Aga Ashurov (neutral).
- Minister of Social Security and Religious Affairs - Musa bey Rafiyev (Musavat).
- Commissioner for Military Affairs - Ismail khan Ziyadkhanov (neutral).
- State Inspector - Abdulali bey Amirjanov (neutral).

=== Third Cabinet: 26 December 1918 – 14 March 1919 ===
- Chairman of the Council of Ministers and Minister of Foreign Affairs - Fatali khan Khoyski (neutral).
- Minister of Internal Affairs - Khalil bey Khasmammadov (Musavat).
- Minister of Finance - I. Protasov (Slavic-Russian Society).
- Minister of Roads - Khudadat bey Malik-Aslanov (neutral).
- Minister of Justice - T. Makinski (?).
- Minister of Education and Religious Affairs - Nasib bey Yusifbeyli (Musavat).
- Minister of Post and Telegraph and Labor - Aslan bey Safikurdski (socialist).
- Military Minister- Samad bey Mehmandarov (neutral).
- Minister of Social Security - Rustam khan Khoyski (neutral).
- Minister of Public Health - Y. Gindes (Slavic-Russian Society).
- Minister of Trade and Industry - Mirza Asadullayev (neutral).
- State Inspector - Mammadhasan Hajinski (16.01.1919).
- Minister of Food - Konstantin Lizgar (Slavic-Russian Society).
- Minister of Agriculture - Khosrov bey Sultanov (Musavat).

=== Fourth Cabinet: 14 March 1919 – 22 December 1919 ===
- Chairman of the Council of Ministers and Minister of Internal Affairs - Nasib bey Yusifbeyli (neutral).
- Minister of Finance - Aliaga Hasanov (neutral).
- Minister of Trade and Industry - Aga Aminov (neutral).
- Minister of Foreign Affairs - Mammad Yusif Jafarov (Musavat).
- Minister of Roads - Khudadat bey Malik-Aslanov] (neutral).
- Minister of Post and Telegraph - Camo bey Hajinski (socialist).
- Military Minister- Samad bey Mehmandarov (neutral).
- Minister of Social Security - Victor Klenevsky (Slavic-Russian Society).
- Minister of Health - Abram Dastakov (Dashnaktsutyun).
- Minister of Education and Religious Affairs - Rashid khan Gaplanov (Ahrar).
- Minister of Agriculture - Aslan bey Gardashov (Ahrar).
- Minister without portfolio - Khoren Amaspur (Dashnaktsutyun).
- State Inspector - Nariman bey Narimanbeyli (Musavat).
- Minister of Justice and Labor - Aslan bey Safikurdski (socialist).
- Later the Minister of Internal Affairs - Khalil bey Khasmammadov (Musavat).

=== Fifth cabinet: 24 December 1919 – 01 April 1920 ===
- Chairman of the Council of Ministers - Nasib bey Yusifbeyli (Musavat).
- Minister of Foreign Affairs - Fatali khan Khoyski (neutral).
- Military Minister - Samad bey Mehmandarov (neutral).
- Minister of Internal Affairs - Mammadhasan Hajinski 18.09.02. After 1920 Mustafa bey Vakilov (first Musavat, then communist, Mustafa bey Vakilov - Musavat).
- Minister of Justice - Khalil bey Khasmammadov (Musavat).
- Minister of Finance - Rashid khan Gaplanov (Ahrar).
- Minister of Education and Religious Affairs - Hamid bey Shahtakhtinski (after 05.03.1920 Nurmammad bey Shahsuvarov, both-Ittihad).
- Minister of Labor and Labor - Ahmad bey Pepinov (socialist).
- Minister of Roads, as well as Interim Minister for Trade, Industry and Food - Khudadat bey Malik-Aslanov (after 18.02.1920 - Minister of Trade, Industry and Food - Mammadhasan Hajinski).
- Minister of Post and Telegraph - Camo bey Hajinski (socialist).
- Minister of Social Security and Health - Musa bey Rafiyev (Musavat).
- State Inspector - Heybatgulu Mammadbeyli (Ittihad).
