= Nariman bey Narimanbeyov =

Azerbaijani statesman

Nariman bey Narimanbeyov Azerbaijani: Nəriman bəy Nərimanbəyli
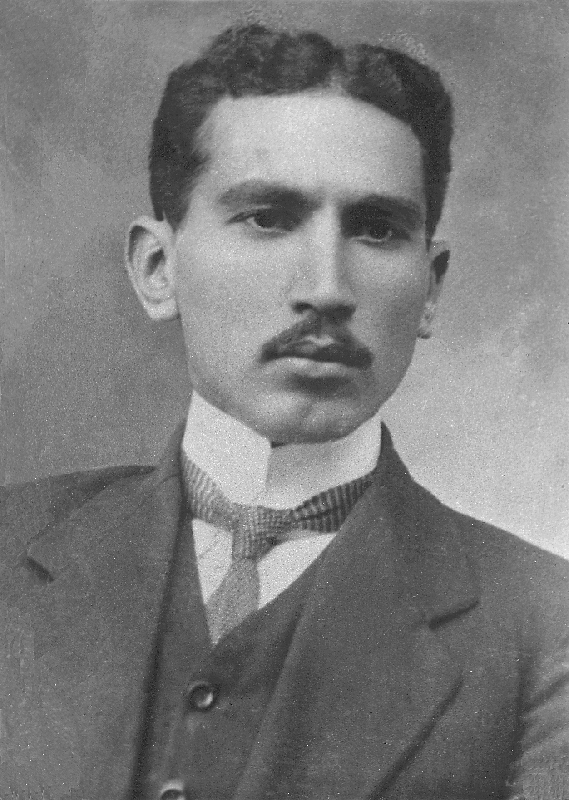

State Controller (ADR)
- In office April 14, 1919 – December 22, 1919
- President: Nasib Yusifbeyli Prime Minister, (Chairman of Azerbaijani Parliament)
- Preceded by: Mehdi bey Hajinski
- Succeeded by: Heybat Gulu Mammadbayov

Personal details
- Born: 1889 Baku, Azerbaijan
- Died: 1937 (aged 47–48) Solovetsky Islands, Russia
- Party: Musavat
- Relations: Narimanbekov family

Nariman bey Hashim oglu Narimanbeyov (Azerbaijani: Nəriman bəy Həşim bəy oğlu Nərimanbəyli; 1889–1937), also known as Nariman bey Narimanbeyli (Azerbaijani: Nəriman bəy Nərimanbəyli), was an Azerbaijani lawyer and statesman who served as State Controller in the fourth cabinet of Azerbaijan Democratic Republic, and was member of Parliament of Azerbaijan.

== Early years ==
Narimanbeyov was born in 1889 in Shusha, Azerbaijan. After completing his secondary education at an Erivan gymnasium where his father taught, he attended universities in Russian and Ukraine, graduating from Department of Physics and Mathematics of Moscow State University and Law Department of Kharkov State University. While abroad, he was an active member of Azerbaijani students revolutionary movement. In 1915, he returned to Azerbaijan and worked as an attorney. Narimanbeyov was also the chairman of Muslim Charity Society in Baku.

== Political career ==
In 1917, Narimanbeyov joined Musavat Party and was elected a member of the Muslim fraction of Transcaucasian Sejm. He was a member of the Azerbaijani National Council on the eve of declaration of independence who voted in favor of establishing an independent republic. After establishment of Azerbaijan Democratic Republic on May 28, 1918, Narimanbeyov was elected to the National Assembly of Azerbaijan. When the fourth government under Nasib Yusifbeyli was formed on April 14, 1919, he was appointed State Controller of ADR.

After Bolshevik take over of Azerbaijan, Narimanbeyov worked as a legal council but was soon arrested and became another victim of the Great Purge repressions. He was sent to Solovki prison camp on Solovetsky Islands where he died in 1937.

== See also ==
- Azerbaijani National Council
- Cabinets of Azerbaijan Democratic Republic (1918–1920)
- Current Cabinet of Azerbaijan Republic
