= Ittihad Party (Azerbaijan) =

Political Party in Azerbaijan

Ittihad Party İttihad Firqəsi
- Founded: September 1917
- Ideology: Pan-Islamism; Anti Pan-Turkism

The Ittihad Party (Azerbaijani: İttihad firqəsi) was an Islamist party in the Azerbaijan Democratic Republic that existed from 1917 to 1920. It was formed after the groups Ganja Ittihad-i Islam and Rusyada Muslumanliq merged in September 1917 in opposition to the secular Musavat, and proposed political unity of all of the Muslims within the Russian Empire (ittihad in Arabic means "union"). In addition to propagating the legalization of the Sharia law within the Muslim communities, the goal of the Ittihadists was to prevent the formation of independent nation-states by the Muslim ethnic groups of the Russian Empire. In 1918, Ittihad won 11 seats in the Azerbaijani parliament, becoming the second largest party in the legislature by number of seats. The Ittihadists' vehement opposition to Musavat, which formed the minority government in Azerbaijan in 1918–1920, led to their collaboration with the White Russians under Anton Denikin. Upon the defeat of the latter, Ittihad started leaning politically towards the approaching Bolsheviks who eventually Sovietized Azerbaijan on 28 April 1920. By that time, the Ittihad leaders had made a statement declaring the fulfillment of their goals and urging their members to join the newly formed Azerbaijan Communist Party. The leader of the party, Dr. Gara Garabeyov, eventually émigrated to Turkey.

== See also ==
- Azerbaijani National Council
- Musavat
- Muslim Social Democratic Party
- Asad bey Amirov
- Bahram bey Vazirov
