= Bahram bey Vazirov =

Azerbaijani politician, statesman and poet

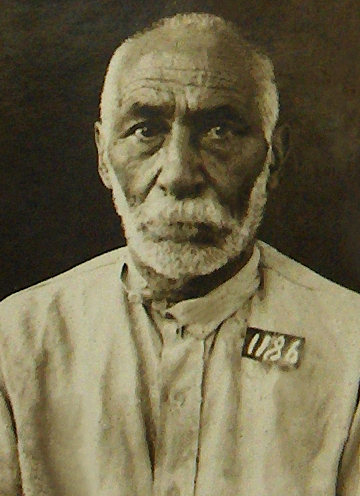
- Born: Bahram bey Asad bey oghlu Vazirov; December 23, 1857; Mirzacamallı, Shusha uezd, Shemakha Governorate
- Died: December 1921 (aged 63–64); Fuzuli District, Azerbaijani SSR
- Occupations: Statesman, politician and poet

Bahram bey Asad bey oghlu Vazirov (d. 23 December 1857; Mirzacamallı, Shusha uezd, Shemakha Governorate - d. 1921; Fuzuli District, Azerbaijani SSR) was an Azerbaijani politician, statesman, member of the Parliament of the Azerbaijan Democratic Republic and poet.

== Life ==
Bahram bey Vazirov was born in 1857 in the village of Mirzajamalli, Jabrayil district (modern Fuzuli district). He graduated from the Shusha Realni School and entered the law faculty of Saint Petersburg State University. After finishing education he started work as a lawyer in his hometown. Vazirov is one of the participants of the Azerbaijani Freedom Movement during World War I and he became a member of the Parliament of Azerbaijani Democratic Republic which was established by Azerbaijani National Council on 7 December 1918. In the parliament he was deputy of the Ittihad fraction.

After Red Army invasion of Azerbaijan, he, like many others, was declared a "public enemy", then Bolshevik government confiscate all of his property and he was convicted deprivation of the right to vote for a period of 9 years. After these events Bahram bey began active propaganda work against the Bolsheviks. In June 1921, Bahram bey was captured and shot without trial or investigation in Aghdam jail by Bolsheviks.

== Creativity ==
Bahram bey was a member of Vazirovs family which was very popular in Karabakh region. Prominent Azerbaijani poet Gasim bey Zakir was Bahram's grandfather and they have affinity with Karabakh kans. His father Asad bey was also poet and worked as a doctor. The brothers (Bakhish bey Sabur, Isfandiyar bey Gulchin) were also poets; together they attended the Majlisi-Uns. Bahram bey wrote poems under the pseudonym Fedai. Since childhood, he showed great interest in poetry and studied Arabic, Persian languages, also acquired new knowledge in the art of versification, philosophy, history, and Islam.

== See also ==
- Mashadi Abdul Muradli

== Sources ==
- Çingizoğlu, Ənvər (2004). Hacılılar. Baku: Soy.
- Азербайджанская Демократическая Республика (1918―1920). Законодательные акты. (Сборник документов). Baku. 1998.
