= Vazirovs =

Vazirovs Vəzirovlar
- Parent family: Javanshir clan
- Country: Azerbaijan
- Place of origin: Karabakh Khanate
- Founded: 19th century

Vazirovs or Vezirovs (Azerbaijani: Vəzirovlar) are an Azerbaijani noble family from Karabakh and a part of Javanshir clan. Vazirov or Vezirov is a Russified version of the word vizier. First person to adopt the surname was Azerbaijani historian and later Imperial Russian army officer Mirza Jamal Javanshir, who was a vizier of Ibrahim Khalil Khan and Mehdigulu Khan of Karabakh.

== History ==
Connected to ruling family of Karabakh Khanate, Vazirovs were descended from Sharif beg Javanshir, head of Hajilu subclan of Javanshir clan. Sharif beg was great-grandfather of Mirza Jamal. Family had two branches - elder one based in Shusha and younger one based in Karyagino, modern Fuzuli. Famous family members include politicians like Zeynal bey Vazirov, Bahram bey Vazirov; as well as poets, merchants and army officers. Penultimate leader of Soviet Azerbaijan, Abdurrahman Vazirov was also a member of this family. According to him, suggestion to adopt surname Vazirov came from Mirza Fatali Akhundov to Mirza Jamal.

== Members ==
Sharif bey Javanshir was earlieast attested member of the family, whom had two sons. This is not a full list and only intends to show important members of the family:

- Abu Talib bey Javanshir (b. 1760)
  - Imamgulu bey Javanshir (b. 1777)
    - Mirza Zeynalabdin bey Javanshir (b. 1794)
      - Talib bey Vazirov (b. 1814) — married Mirza Jamal's niece Masharaf khanum
        - Abbas bey Vazirov (1846 – 1910) — captain in Imperial Russian Army, took part in Karabakh scene of Armenian-Tatar massacres of 1905
      - Mirza Hamid bey Vazirov (b. 1827) — lawyer, collegiate assessor
        - Zeynal bey Vazirov (1854 – 1933) — MP of Parliament of the Azerbaijan Democratic Republic
          - Aslan bey Vazirzade (1898 – 1984) — Honored Scientist of the Azerbaijan SSR
        - Farrukh bey Vazirov (1857 – 1920) — first Azerbaijani engineer to be educated in Europe
        - Azad bey Vazirov (1869 – 1921) — colonel of Azerbaijani Army and Red Army
          - Suleyman Vazirov (1910 – 1973) — Minister of Oil Industry of Azerbaijan SSR
        - Javad bey Vazirov (1873 – 1925) — first Azerbaijani agriculturist to be educated in Europe
- Salif bey Javanshir — commander of Karabakh Khanate
  - Mahammadkhan bey Javanshir (d. 17 July 1797) — constable of Shusha fortress, naib of Javanshir-Dizak mahal
    - Mirza Jamal Javanshir (1773 – 1853) — Azerbaijani historian, author of Tarikh-e Qarabagh
      - Rzagulu bey Vazirov (1814 – 1875) — historian, biographer, praporshchik in Imperial Russian Army
        - Hashim bey Vazirov (b. 1837) — titular councillor
          - Rzagulu bey Vazirov (b. 1870)
            - Rustam Vazirov — pedagogue
            - Khalil Vazirov — Soviet Army lieutenant, recipient of Order of the Red Star
              - Abdurrahman Vazirov (1930 – 2022) — 13th First Secretary of the Azerbaijan Communist Party (1988 – 1990)
              - Bayaz Vazirova — married Leonid Weinstein (1945 – 1994, Soviet and Azerbaijani composer, Honored Artist of Azerbaijan)
            - Jamil Vazirov — recipient of Order of the Red Banner of Labour
          - Durnisa khanum — married to Zeynal bey Vazirov
        - Mahammadshafi bey Vazirov — progenitor of Mirzajamalov family
    - Gasim bey Javanshir (1784 – ?) — brother of Mirza Jamal, naib of Javanshir-Dizak mahal
      - Asad bey Vazir (1824 – 1873) — poet and doctor
        - Samad bey Vazirov (1853 – 1892) — poet and state official
        - Bahram bey Vazirov (1857 – 1921) — statesman, politician and poet
        - Isfandiyar bey Vazirov (1859 – 1920) — poet
          - Shamil bey Vazirov (d. 1967) — pedagogue
            - Farida Vazirova (1924 – 1986) — World War II veteran and professor of philology
        - Bakhish bey Sabut (1863 – 1923) — poet
      - Masharaf khanum — married Talib bey Vazirov
