= On the Political Affairs of the Karabakh khanate in 1747–1805 =

The On the Political Affairs of the Karabakh khanate in 1747–1805 was a book written in Russian by Ahmad bey Javanshir about the history of the Qarabagh (Karabakh) region.

== Manuscript ==
His daughter Hamida Javanshir took the manuscript of historical work On the Political Affairs of the Karabakh khanate in 1747–1805 to Tiflis (capital of present-day Georgia) in order to get it printed at the Geyrat publishing house.

== See also ==
- Garabaghname by Mirza Adigozal bey
- Tarikh-e Qarabagh by Jamal Javanshir Qarabaghi

== Publications ==
- Джеваншир А. О политическомъ существованiи Карабачскаго ханства съ 1747 по 1805 годъ. — Тифлисъ: тип. Канц. главноначальствующаго гражд. частiю на Кавказѣ, 1884. — 21 с.
  - Джеваншир А. О политическом существовании Карабагского ханства с 1747 по 1805 год. — Шуша: типо-лит. А. М. Мугдусиакопова, 1901. — 75 с.
  - Джеваншир А. О политическом существовании карабахского ханства (с 1747 по 1805 год). — Баку: Изд-во АН Азерб. ССР, 1961. — 104 с. — 6500 экз. (рус.) (азерб.)
