= Rajabli =

Rajabli (Azerbaijani: Rəcəbli) is an Azerbaijani surname. Notable people with the surname include:

- Ahad Rajabli (1962–2013), Azerbaijan sambo champion
- Ahmed Rajabli (1898–1963), Azerbaijani and Soviet agronomist, geneticist, pedagogue, and professor
- Omar Rajabli (born 2003), Azerbaijani judoka
