= Azad bey Vazirov =

Azerbaijani military officer and colonel

- Azerbaijani: Azad bəy Mirzə Həmid bəy oğlu Vəzirov
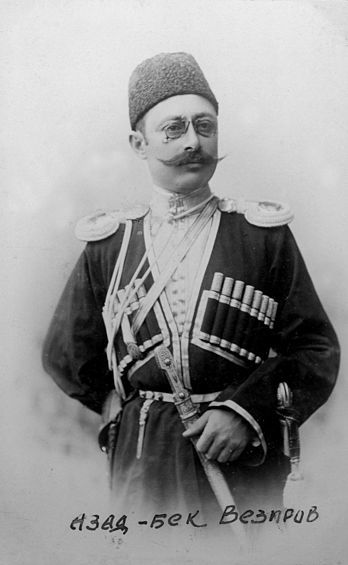
- Azad bey Vazirov in 1898.
- Born: Azad bey Mirza Hamid bey oglu Vazirov; August 22, 1869; Shusha, Shusha Uyezd, Imperial Russia
- Died: June 30, 1921 (aged 51); Qazvin, Qajar Empire
- Spouse: Zahra Mehmandarova
- Children: Isa bey Vazirov; Musa bey Vazirov; Suleyman Vazirov; Isa bey Vazirov (the second); Kheyransa Khanum; Goncha Khanum; Gulrukh Khanum
- Relatives: Vazirovs
- Military career
- Allegiance: Russian Empire 1888 — 1893 and 1898 — 1917; Azerbaijan Democratic Republic 1918 — 1920; Russian SFSR Red Army
- Service years: 1888 — 1921
- Rank: (Russian Empire) Lieutenant colonel of The Imperial Russian Army (1888 — 1893 and 1898 — 1917), colonel of The National Army of Azerbaijan Democratic Republic (1918 — 1920); Russian SFSR colonel of Red Army (1920 — 1921)
- Conflicts: World War I
- Awards: 3rd Class Ode of Saint Stanislaus 3rd Class Order of Saint Anne

Azad bey Vazirov (Azerbaijani: Azad bəy Mirzə Həmid bəy oğlu Vəzirov) (22 August 1869, in Shusha, Russian Empire – 1921 in Qazvin, Qajar Empire) was an Azerbaijani military officer, colonel. Father of the Soviet statesman, organizer of the oil industry, Hero of Socialist Labour Suleyman Vazirov.

== Life ==
Descended "from the nobility family of the city of Shusha". He entered the service as a volunteer in the 43rd Tver Dragoon Regiment. December 20, 1888 was sent to the Elisavetgrad Cavalry School. After graduating from military college in the second category on July 3, 1892, he was promoted to standard junker and returned to the regiment. On June 27, 1893, he was promoted to cornet with enrollment in the reserve. In 1901 cornet Vazirov was appointed adjutant of the Dagestan Cavalry Regiment. Since October 27, 1901, he got the rank of Poruchik, Staff captain (27.10.1905), Rittmeister (10/27/1909) in the Imperial Russian Army.

He also served in the Ministry of Internal Affairs of Russian Empire as a senior chief officer for assignments under the Baku Governor (on September 1, 1916). In 1917, he was promoted to the rank of lieutenant colonel.

He served in the army of the Azerbaijan Democratic Republic. In late 1918 and early 1919, Lieutenant Colonel Vezirov served as the Ganja military commander, then as the commandant of the city of Baku. By order of the government of the Azerbaijan Democratic Republic No. 28 dated June 25, 1919, he was promoted to colonel. Also he served in the Red Army. Azad bey Bazirov died in Qazvin in 1921.

== Family ==
Azad bey married Karim bey Mehmandarov's daughter Zahra. They had sons named Isa Bey, Musa Bey, Suleyman Vazirov, Isa Bey (the second), daughters named Kheyransa Khanum, Goncha Khanum and Gulrukh Khanum.

== Awards ==
- - 3rd Class Order of Saint Stanislaus (1879)
- - 3rd Class Order of Saint Anne (1881)
