= Tarikh-e Qarabagh =

The Tarikh-e Qarabagh (Persian: تاریخ قره‌باغ, lit. 'History of Karabakh') is a book written by Mirza Jamal Javanshir sometime after 1847 about the history of the Karabakh region. Written in Persian, the literary language of the Muslims in the Caucasus, it was composed on the order of the then Russian Viceroy of the Caucasus, Mikhail Semyonovich Vorontsov (in office 1844–1854). The book deals with the history of the Karabakh region from the coming of the Arabs through the Muslim conquest of Iran in the 7th century, up to the Imperial Russian conquest through the Russo-Persian War of 1804-1813.

The focus of the book primarily lies on the Karabakh Khanate, from Nader Shah's era (r. 1736–1747) until the death of Ibrahim Khalil Khan in 1806. A section of the work also describes the conflict between the khans from the Javanshir clan and the Armenian Meliks of Karabakh, which, according to George Bournoutian, is of special importance, as it deals with the large Armenian presence in the Karabakh region, yet is written by an author of non-Armenian heritage.

Although written in Persian, the work of Mirza Jamal Javanshir is actually a product of Azeri historiography. The original manuscript is kept at the archives of the Azerbaijan National Academy of Sciences in Baku.

A simplified translation of the book into Russian by Adolf Berge was published in the newspaper Kavkaz in 1855. Accurate Russian and Azerbaijani translations of the work were published by the Academy of Sciences of the Azerbaijan SSR in 1959. In a 1989 Azerbaijani translation of the work edited by Nazim Akhundov, the text was deliberately altered to exclude mentions of Armenians. George Bournoutian published an annotated English translation of the work in 1994, as well as a second edition in 2004.

== Sources ==
- Bournoutian, George (1994). A History of Qarabagh: An Annotated Translation of Mirza Jamal Javanshir Qarabaghi's Tarikh-e Qarabagh. Mazda Publishers. ISBN 978-1568590110.
- Bournoutian, George (2008). "JAVĀNŠIR QARĀBĀḠI, JAMĀL". Encyclopaedia Iranica, Vol. XIV, Fasc. 6. pp. 602–603.
- Bournoutian, George (1992). "Rewriting History: Recent Azeri Alterations of Primary Sources Dealing with Karabakh". Journal of the Society for Armenian Studies. 6: 185–190. Archived from the original on 2001-11-10 – via Library of Congress Web Archives.
- Bournoutian, George (2004). Two Chronicles on the History of Karabagh. Costa Mesa, California: Mazda Publishers. ISBN 1-56859-179-9 – via Internet Archive.
- Galichian, Rouben (2009). The Invention of History: Azerbaijan, Armenia, and the Showcasing of Imagination. Printinfo Art Books. ISBN 978-1903656860.
- Hewsen, Robert H. (1995). "Review: George A. Bournoutian, A History of Qarabagh: An Annotated Translation of Mirza Jamal Javanshir Qarabaghi's Tarikh-e Qarabagh". Journal of the Society for Armenian Studies. 6.
- Kemaloğlu, Muhammet (2014). "Karabağ Tarihi" (PDF). Hikmet Yurdu. 7 (14): 209–225.

== See also ==
- Garabaghname by Mirza Adigozal bey
- On the Political Affairs of the Karabakh Khanate in 1747–1805 by Ahmad bey Javanshir
