= Mashadi Abdul Muradli =

- Born: Bahram bey Asad bey oghlu Vazirov; 1844; Mirzacamallı, Shusha uezd, Shemakha Governorate
- Died: 1900 (aged 55–56); Fuzuli District, Azerbaijani SSR
- Occupations: Statesman, politician and poet

Mashadi Abdul Muradli (Azerbaijani: Məşədi Əbdül Muradlı; b. 1844; Shusha, Elizavetpol Governorate, Russian Empire - d. 1900; Shusha, Elizavetpol Governorate, Russian Empire) was an Azerbaijani poet and a member of Majlisi-Faramushan.

== Life ==
Mashadi Abdul Muradli was born in 1844 in the city of Shusha. He received a good education in a Madrasa. He was engaged in trade and worked in Petrovsk. He wrote poetry under the pseudonyms Shahin and Rakhzan. The poet Mir Mohsun Navvab writes about him:

One of the good-natured and popular poets of Karabakh is Abdul ibn Husseinali ibn Mashadi Murad. But the late Abdul was known by his mother's name. So called him all the people of Karabakh - Abdul Fatioglu. He was born, and also received education and upbringing in the Shusha fortress. Twenty years ago he moved to Petrovsk and was engaged in trade there. Died a few years ago. He was between fifty-five and sixty years old.

The poet died in 1900 in his native Shusha.

== Sources ==
- Çingizoğlu, Ənvər (2008). Məşədi Murad uşağı. Baku: Soy.
