= Students of Azerbaijan Democratic Republic abroad =

1920 higher education initiative

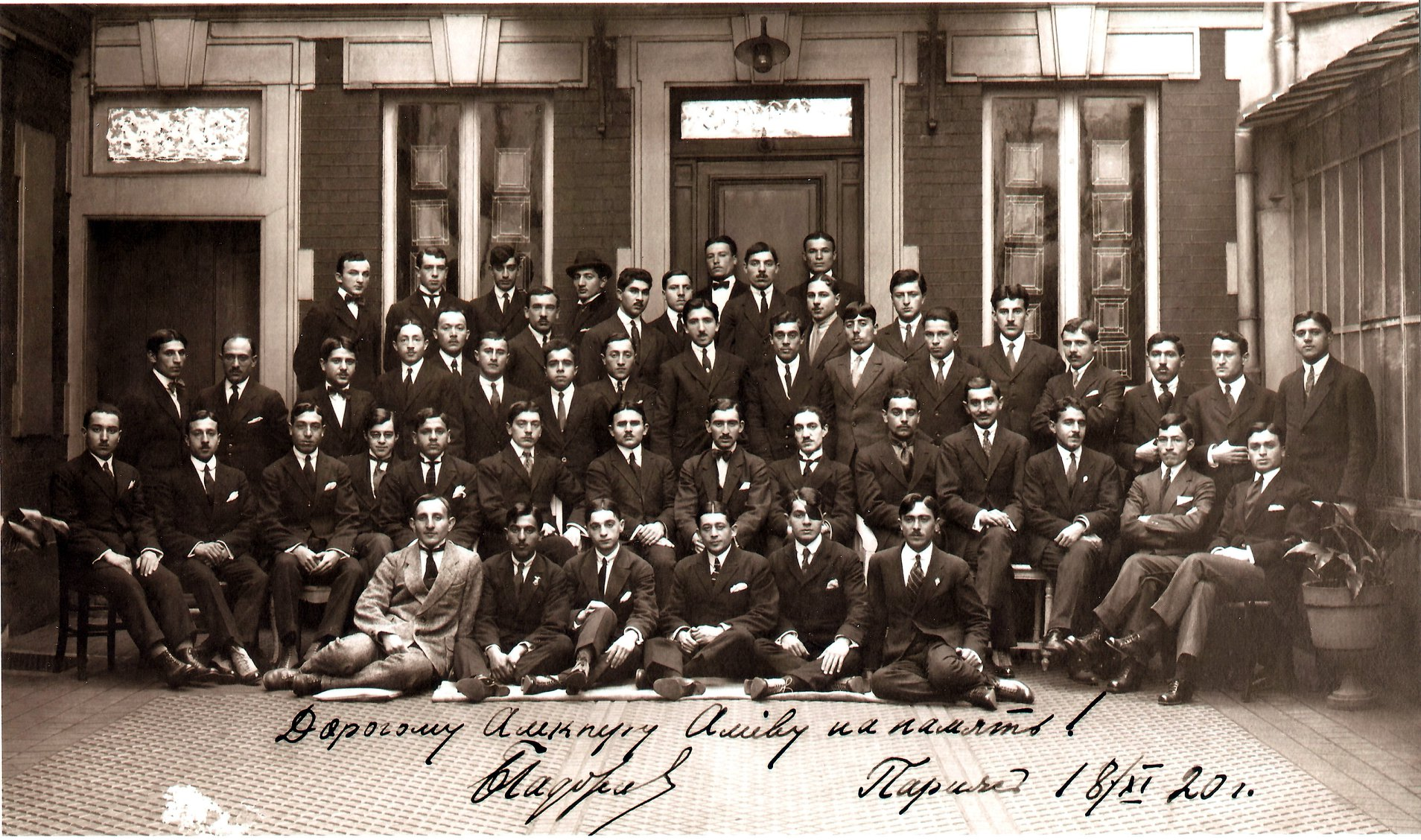
A group of Azerbaijani students upon arrival in Paris. Early 1920 (Note: The photograph was received by Ramiz Abutalibov as a gift from Muhammad Maharramov, a former adviser to the Azerbaijani delegation at the Paris Peace Conference, who once helped young students to settle in Europe.)

At the beginning of 1920, the Government of Azerbaijan Democratic Republic (ADR) sent Students of Azerbaijan Democratic Republic abroad or Republic students (Azerbaijani: Cümhuriyyət tələbələri) to study in higher educational institutions of Western Europe, Russia and Turkey. About 100 students from various strata of society were sent, for which seven million rubles were allocated to the Ministry of Public Education.

After the fall of the Azerbaijan Democratic Republic and the Sovietization of the country following the Red Army invasion of Azerbaijan, students continued their education. Upon completion of their courses, many returned to Azerbaijan and achieved success. Some received government awards, including the Order of Lenin. Notable Republic students include Ahmed Rajabli, Aslan Vezirzade, Ashraf Aliyev, Samandar Akhundov and Teymur Aslanov. Many, however, were repressed in the Great Purge by the People's Commissariat for Internal Affairs (NKVD) in the 1930s on charges of spying for Germany and supporting the restoration of Azerbaijan's independence.

== Decision to send students abroad ==
By the end of 1919, the government of the Azerbaijan Democratic Republic had implemented a number of educational reforms; textbooks for primary and secondary schools were published, seminaries were opened, Baku State University was founded, and a law was passed to prescribe the creation of an agricultural university. The government was looking for ways to train the necessary specialists, in particular by sending Azerbaijani youth abroad for higher education. Despite the difficult military-political situation, it was decided to send Azerbaijanis to study at European universities. Mammad Emin Rasulzade, listing the achievements of Azerbaijan, noted: "To obtain higher education in various fields of knowledge – from architecture and ethnology to aircraft and shipbuilding, about 100 Azerbaijani students at the expense of the state were sent to the best European educational institutions".

=== Parliamentary decree ===
In mid 1919, the Ministry of Education proposed a bill to allocate four million rubles for the 1919–20 academic year to support 100 students studying abroad, with each student receiving an allotment of 36,500 rubles. Upon completion of their studies, these students were obliged to serve in Azerbaijan's civil service for a minimum of two years. Students who were recipients of a government scholarship were also required to work for four years in a government-assigned role post-graduation.

On 1 September 1919, the Parliament of the Azerbaijan Democratic Republic decided to allocate seven million rubles from the state treasury to the Minister of Public Education for the project. The parliament said: "In order to ensure the well-being and success of the students, a system of supervision must be established over them".

=== Organizational matters ===
When discussing this bill in mid 1919, there were controversies in parliamentary factions over sending students from wealthy families abroad. According to many MPs, the body of students should have mostly included the poor, and the sons of wealthy families should have had to study at their own expense. The selection was made among various segments of the population, its main criterion being to send only gifted students. One of the selected students was repressed by the NKVD after returning Azerbaijan said: "There was a proposal to send young men from wealthy families to study, but the student committee created at that time, headed by Mammad Gulu Ganja, supported the candidacies of poor families in need of state support". As a result, "people of both wealthy and poor" were sent to study.

On 15 September 1919, a meeting of parliament was held on the issue of state scholarships for students traveling abroad. The meeting was attended by Mammad Amin Rasulzade, Mehdi bey Hajinski, Ahmad bey Pepinov, Gara bey Garabeyov, Abdulla bey Efendiyev, Aynul Usubbekova, Behbud Khan Javanshir, Neymatulla bey Shakhtakhtinsky, Samandar Akhundov and representative of the Baku committee of Muslim students Mammadgulu Hajinsky.

A commission was created to organize the sending and distribution of students. Before the parliament passed a resolution on sending students, in mid 1919, the Ittihad and Ahrar factions proposed half of the students would go to faculties of history, philology, natural sciences, physics and mathematics to train as teachers in secondary educational institutions. According to their specialties, students were distributed as follows:

- natural science – 8
- medicine – 8
- mining – 7
- mechanics – 11
- chemistry – 3
- electrical engineering – 8
- construction – 4
- aviation – 2
- agronomy – 3
- economics – 5
- history and philology – 5
- philosophy – 7
- legal sciences – 6
- political science – 3

By that time, the commission had received 280 applications. Applicants who knew the Azerbaijani language ("Turkic" in the terminology of that time) and the language of the country where the student was sent, had certificates with a high score, and were also poor, were favored in the selection process.

== Departure of students ==
=== Final preparations ===
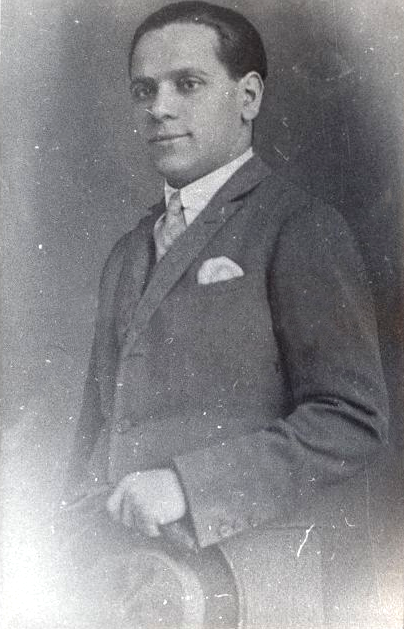
Teymur Aslanov, chairman of the commission for organizing the sending of students abroad

The students who were sent abroad elected a bureau of five members to assist the commission in organizing their departure. Teymur Aslanov was chosen as the commission's chairman and, along with Shakhtakhtinsky, traveled to Tiflis and Batumi to secure the necessary passes. To provide for the students' needs, the bureau petitioned the Ministry of Trade and Industry to supply each student with 40 arşın (28.4 metres (93 ft)) of linen, two pairs of sheets, two pairs of towels and half a dozen scarves, amounting to 2,000 rubles, as well as tea and sugar. The Ministry approved this request.

On December 12, 1919, the commission decided to enroll 100 people as state scholarship recipients. Due to inflation, the stipend was increased from 400 to 500 francs, with an additional 200 francs allocated for the purchase of uniforms. The Ministry of Finance issued each student a total of 2,600 francs.

=== Departure ===
The first group of students embarked on their journey via express train on January 14, 1920. Several members of parliament, including Mammad Amin Rasulzade, Ibrahim Abilov, Samad aga Agamalioglu, Aslan bey Safikurdski, Abbasqulu Kazimzade and Ahmed bey Pepinov, were present to bid them farewell. Rasulzade delivered a parting speech on behalf of the Musavat party, Abilov represented the Social Democratic Party, and Safikurdski spoke for the Khalgchi social revolutionaries. Other speakers included Samad aga Agamalioglu, Piri Mursalzade and Abbasqulu Kazimzade. The speakers wished the students success in their studies and encouraged them to apply their acquired knowledge to the prosperity of their homeland upon their return. Speaking on behalf of the government, Minister of Agriculture Ahmed bey Pepinov assured the students the government would spare no necessary expense for their studies abroad.

The students then settled into a carriage that had been prepared for them; its doors were adorned with the flags of Azerbaijan. From within the carriage, the playing of the tar, the singing of "Segah" and patriotic cries could be heard.(Azerbaijani: Yaşasın Azərbaycan!).

During their journey, the students were warmly welcomed at stops en route, including Kurdamir, Hajiqabul, Yevlakh and Ganja. Upon reaching Tiflis, they were provided with a special carriage for their onward journey to Batumi. Their next stop was Istanbul, where a reception was held for them at the Azerbaijani embassy. From Istanbul, the delegates traveled to Rome, where they were greeted by staff from the Georgian Embassy. On February 11, 1920, 78 of the students arrived in Paris at the Gare de Lyon. The remaining students were sent to Russia and Turkey.

== Years of study ==
=== First month ===
The specialists traveled from Baku to Batumi, then Istanbul, Trento, Rome, Paris, Basel and finally to Berlin. There are contradictions in archival materials regarding the list of countries where the students were planned to be sent. According to pre-departure sources from 1919, the parliament passed a law to send 100 students abroad for study. The countries listed included England with 10 students, Italy with 23, France with 45, Turkey with 9, and Russia with 13. Interrogation records of former German university graduates arrested in the 1930s indicate neither Russia nor England were among the countries where students studied. Many were asked the question: "In which countries and how many students sent by the Musavat government were studied". All respondents named the aforementioned countries, excluding Russia and England. From the interrogation protocols, it was inferred the distribution of students by country was 10 in Turkey, 20 in Italy, 20 in France, and 50 in Germany.

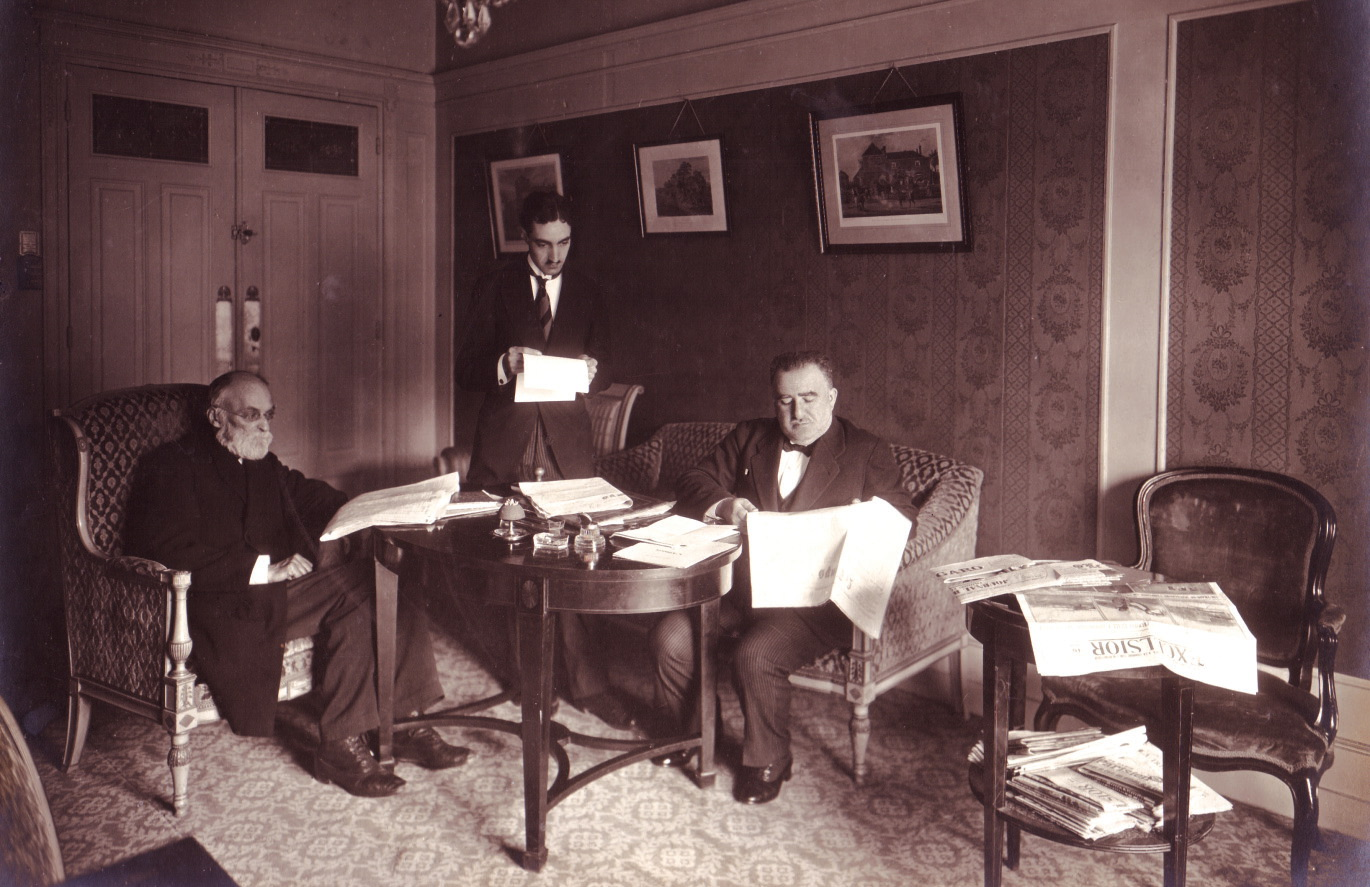
Alimardan bey Topchubashov in Paris. 1920s

Alimardan bey Topchubashov, who welcomed the students in France, facilitated the processing of the necessary documents. Some of the students were assigned to higher educational institutions in France while the remainder proceeded to Germany. As a result, more than half of those sent by the ADR government for overseas study ended up in Berlin. During an interrogation by the NKVD, one of the ADR's envoys Ashraf Aliyev, stated: "In Germany, we were allocated as follows: 10-12 of us were in Berlin, 13-15 were in the Duchy of Baden, and 7, including myself, arrived in Freiburg."

On February 29, 1920, the Ministry of National Education sent an additional 25,200 francs to the diplomatic representative of Azerbaijan in Istanbul, and 172,732 francs were sent to Alimardan bey Topchubashov, the chairman of the Azerbaijani delegation at the Paris Peace Conference. These funds were intended to cover the needs of the students until September 1, 1920. Shortly after, a radio-telegram from Topchubashov confirming the arrival of Azerbaijani students in Paris was received in Baku.

During their initial months of study in Germany, the students established their own public organization, the Union of Azerbaijani Students in Germany. The organization was headquartered in Berlin and had branches in educational institutions in cities including Darmstadt, Freiburg and Leipzig.

=== After the fall of ADR ===
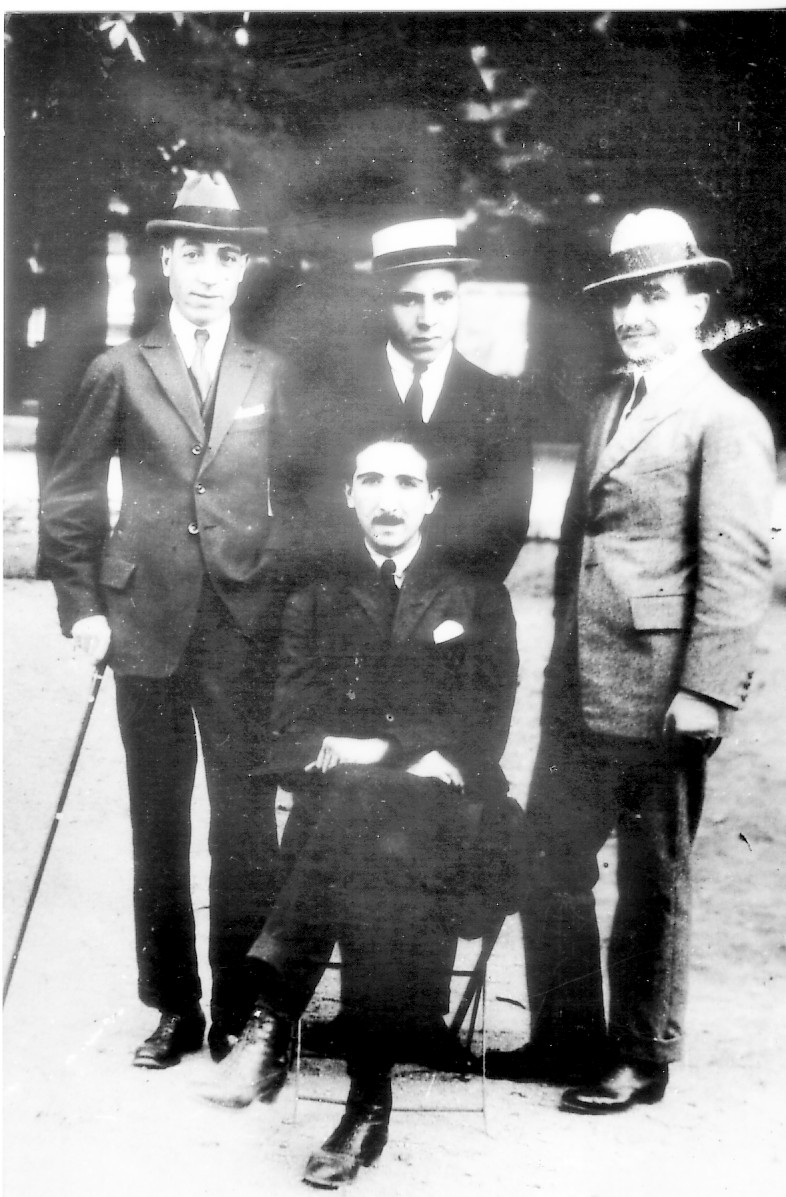
A group of Azerbaijani students in Paris in 1920 (on the right Miri bey Vesirov, brother of Yusif Vazir Chamanzaminli)

A few months after the start of their studies, news of the Red Army invasion of Azerbaijan was received. The invasion led to moral upheavals, a change in political power and the suspension of scholarships from a special fund created by the ADR parliament. In May 1921, the Committee of Azerbaijani Students in Germany sent to Baku one of its activists, student of the Mining Institute in Freiburg Ashraf Aliyev, to negotiate with the Soviet government of Azerbaijan in support of students studying in Western Europe.

Talks in Baku led to an agreement to resume the granting of scholarships. The Soviet authorities set some conditions, among which was the acceptance of Soviet citizenship by students. The amount of the scholarship the Soviet embassy in Berlin began to issue from the budget of the Azerbaijan SSR was approximately $30. At first, money was received irregularly, and with the relocation of the chairman of the Council of People's Commissars of Azerbaijan SSR Nariman Narimanov to work in Moscow, the situation worsened. Leaders who came to power began to classify students as "reliable" and "unreliable". All this forced the students to work in their free time. In his autobiography, Ashraf Aliyev wrote about this period of his life: "In my free time (during holidays) I worked (almost 18 months) in mines, industries and factories in Saxony, Hanover, Ruhr,[Rhine and Alsace".

Ajdar bey Akhundov, who studied in Paris, wrote to the Azerbaijani publicist Jeyhun Hajibeyli, who lived in exile in France, who was a member of the Azerbaijani delegation in Paris:

I cannot express my sincere gratitude for your attention to me at such a difficult moment ... I went to the owners for two months already. But until July 1, I worked in Paris, the job was easier there, and I somehow put up with it, but they came here for the summer (Dinard, a resort in France) to their own villa, and my work increased 10 times, because here you have to get up at 6 in the morning and go to the city center for milk. It is about 2.5 miles from the villa, and with my health you can imagine what I endure. Arriving home at 8 o'clock, work begins, cleaning the apartment of 14 rooms, until I clean it, by God, my legs tremble from fatigue and weakness, in addition, I have to help in the kitchen... and so on until 10 pm. Forgive me, for God's sake, that I am crying now and cannot continue to write ... For God's sake, save me, I am afraid that I will lose my mind from fear... I remain faithful to you.

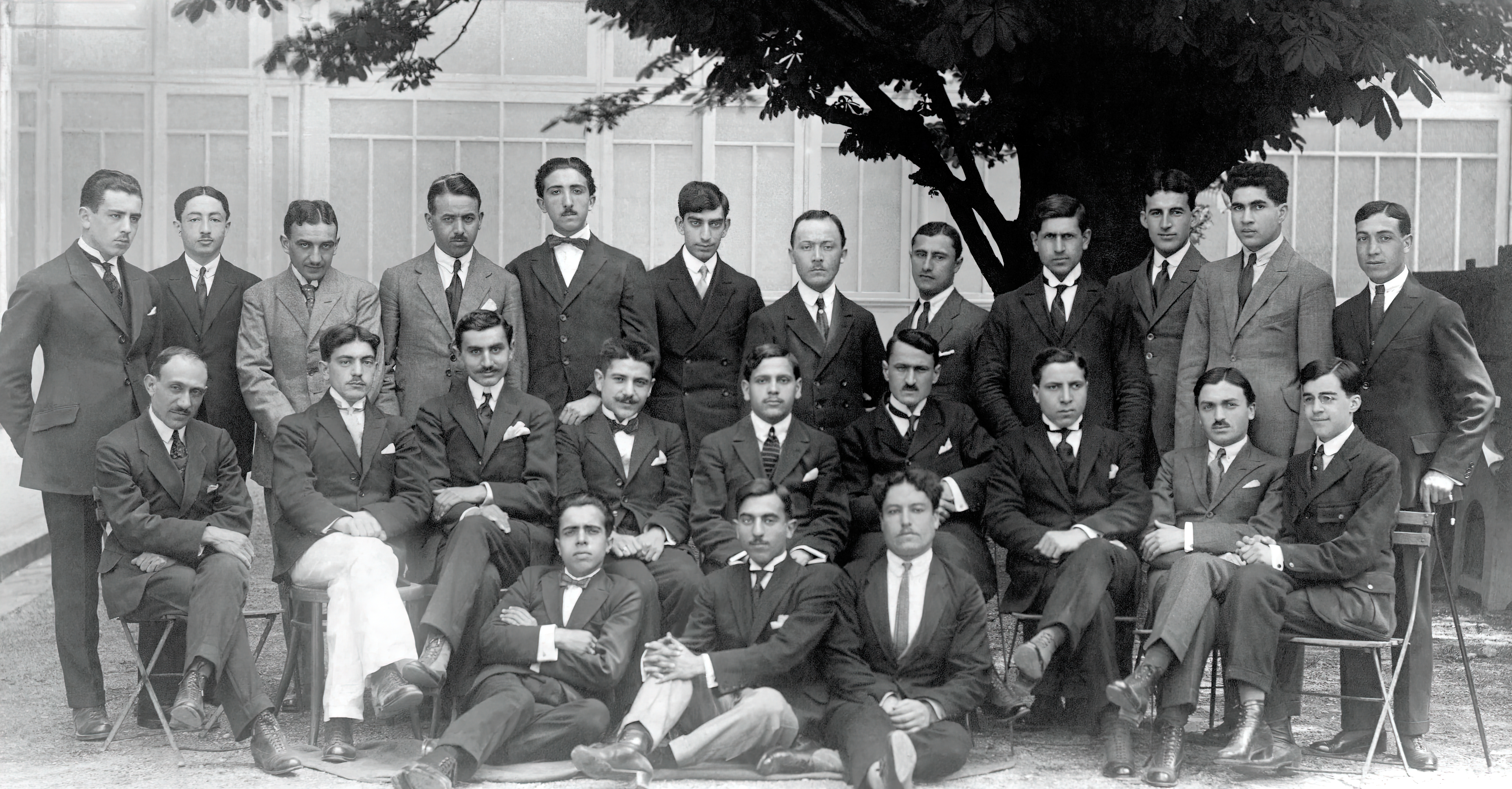
Azerbaijani students celebrate Independence Day on 28 May 1920 in Paris (sitting third from left – Ajdar bey Akhundov)

Two of the students, Shikhzamanov and Ismail Aliyev, went to jail for non-payment of debts. Shipbuilding student Abdul-Huseyn Dadashev wrote to Jeyhun Hajibeyli from Germany the Azerbaijani government removed him from the list along with several students because of "local comrades, whose opinions did not agree with his views".

Dr. Bahram Akhundov, who was appointed in 1919 to be responsible for young people studying abroad, being in Istanbul, wrote to Jeyhun Hajibeyli in Paris on 21 July 1922 about the situation of students, that while working in Baku for more than two months for students, he prepared the commission about 200 diamonds and sent them via Moscow with two students. Not knowing how they implemented them, Akhundov noted Nariman Narimanov wrote a letter about this to the Berlin office. Akhundov also wrote due to the absence of Narimanov, the situation of students had completely changed. Akhundov said: "I do not forget them and I will not forget. Upon arrival in Baku I will work for them, we need them, so long as they study."

== After graduation ==
=== Non-returnees ===
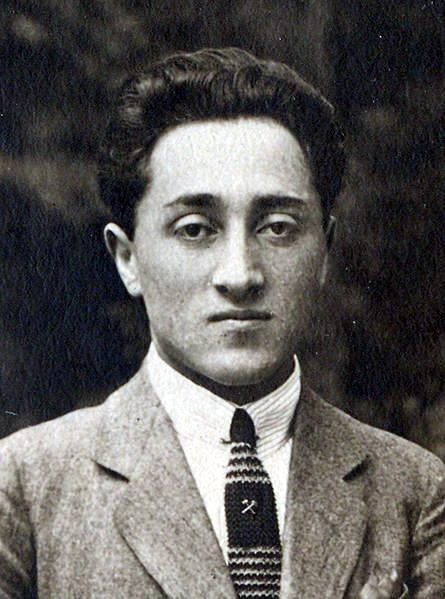
Hilal Munshi, student of the Mining Institute of Freiburg, who remained after studying in exile

After graduating, some students did not want to return to Soviet Azerbaijan, deciding to stay in the West and live in exile. Among them was Hilal Munshi, who was sent by the ADR government to study in Germany. From 1928, he conducted organizational work on the decision of the governing bodies of Azerbaijani emigration. From 1930 he worked as a technical editor, first at the newspaper "Istiklal" (Independence) and then "Kurtulush" (Salvation). In 1930, Munshi published a brochure about Azerbaijan in German. Also established contacts with public groups and the press.

The son of Alimardan bey Topchubashov Rashid bey Topchubashov, who was sent to study at the University of Paris, refused the scholarship offered by the Soviet leadership of Azerbaijan. Topchubashov was the personal secretary of the delegation's chairman, his father Alimardan bey Topchubashov. Rashid died in Paris in 1926.

Abbas Atamalibeyov studied shipbuilding at Paris University. He was the secretary of the Azerbaijani delegation at the Paris Peace Conference. After completing his studies, he continued his political activities in Paris, graduating from the School of Political Sciences. After the death of Alimardan bey Topchubashov, he became leader of Azerbaijani emigrants in France. After the occupation of France by Germany, Atamalibeyov lived in Berlin, where he worked in the Committee of the Red Cross and played an important role in rescuing captured Azerbaijani soldiers during World War II. He was in a group together with Abdurrahman Fatalibeyli and F. Amirjanli), associated with the activities of the Azerbaijani Legion. After World War II, Atamalibeyov moved to Chile and in 1967, he moved to the United States, where he died in 1971.

Adil Muganli, who studied at the Faculty of Medicine of Leipzig University, did not return to Azerbaijan. He went to Paris from Berlin in 1923.

=== Returnees ===
Many students from Azerbaijan, after completing their studies, decided to return and start working for their country. According to researcher Mammad Jafarov, these people, who left independent Azerbaijan and lived in Europe for 5–10 years, began to compare capitalist ways of managing with Soviet ones, and came to the idea of the need for a passive or active struggle against the existing system.

==== Achievements ====
The graduates of European universities who returned to Azerbaijan achieved success with their work and knowledge. Some of them became directors of factories, heads of oil fields, and executives. Some of them received government awards, including the Order of Lenin.

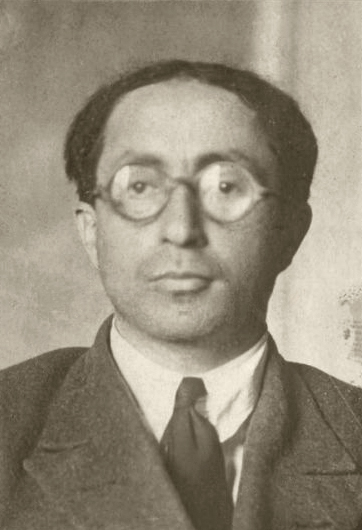
Employee of the Azerbaijan branch of the USSR Academy of Sciences, Aslan Vezirzade. 1930s

Graduate of Dresden Polytechnic Institute Yusuf Agasibeyli, from 1931 worked in Ganja as the chief mechanic at an oil refinery. Graduate of the Mining Institute of Freiburg, Ashraf Aliyev, became the director of the drilling office of the Kaganovichneft, and in 1932 he was awarded the Order of Lenin. Graduate of Prussian Higher Textile Institute (Cottbus) Teymur Aslanov was the director of the textile mill in Ganja. Samandar Akhundov, who also graduated from the Mining Institute of Freiburg, worked as an executive in the heavy industry section of the State Planning Committee of the Azerbaijan SSR. Dinara Kazimova, after returning to Azerbaijan, worked in the country's industry.

Aslan Vezirzade, a graduate of the Paris Mining Institute who returned to Baku in 1925, taught at Azerbaijan Polytechnic Institute, where he was the head of the department of crystallography, mineralogy and petrography, and later was awarded the title of Honored Scientist of the Azerbaijan SSR.

Graduate of the Technical Institute of Darmstadt Bahram Huseynzade worked in Ganja as the head of electrical equipment in a textile mill, and later in Baku headed the Azselelectro sector at the NKZ of the Azerbaijan SSR. Asildar Muganli, who studied law at Leipzig University in 1925, returned to Azerbaijan in 1927, worked as a consultant from 1930 to 1933, and later as head of the cash planning group at Azerbaijan State Bank. Mahish Safarov, a graduate of the Technical Institute of Darmstadt, returned to Azerbaijan in 1926 and worked as a German teacher at the Pedagogical College of the People's Commissariat for Education. Iskenderbek Sultanov, who graduated from the Charlottenburg Polytechnic Institute in 1929, returned to the USSR in 1933 and worked at the "Electrorazvedka" trust of Azneft.

Some, after returning to Azerbaijan, tried to emigrate back to the West. Among those who succeeded are Technical Institute of Darmstadt graduates Huseyn Shikhiev and Mamed Efendiyev, who returned to Baku in 1927 and left the USSR in 1930. Mirismail Seyidzade, after returning from Germany, worked as the chief engineer of Baktramvay, and emigrated to Germany with his wife in 1934.

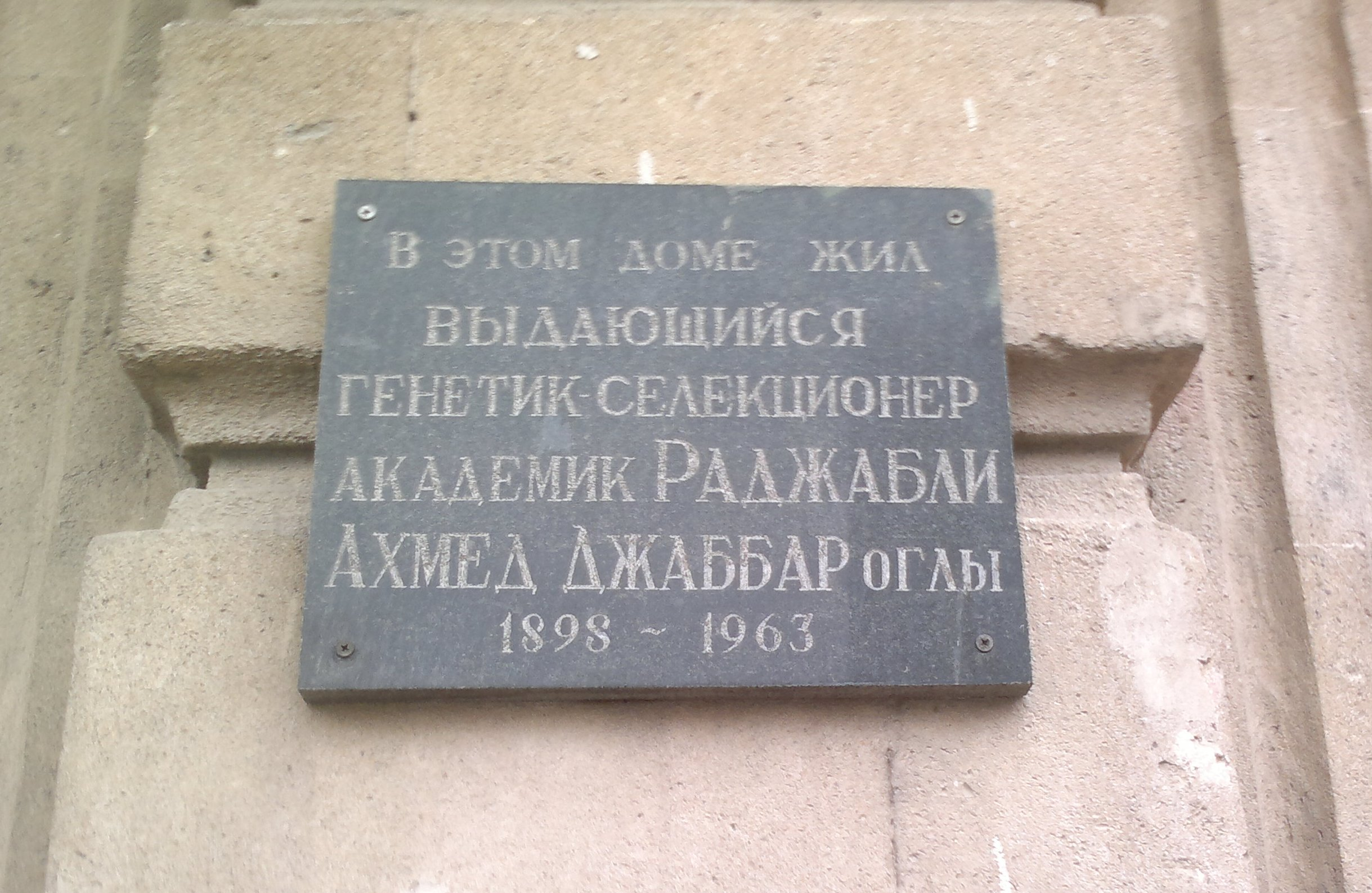
Memorial plaque on the wall of the house in Baku where Ahmad Rajabli lived

Higher Royal Experimental Agrarian Institute Perugia graduate Ahmed Rajabli, after returning to Azerbaijan, worked as the director of an agricultural technical school in Zagatala and organized an experimental agricultural station, having achieved the interconnection of these two structures. From 1931 to 1934, Rajabli was the head of the department of southern technical crops of Azerbaijan Agricultural Institute and at the same time, a consultant to the People's Commissariat of Agriculture. In 1935, the Higher Attestation Commission in Moscow awarded Rajabli the academic title of professor; he was elected a member of the subtropical crops section of the VASKhNIL, and later became an academician, a member of the Presidium of the Azerbaijan Agricultural Academy.

The father of Togrul and Vidadi Narimanbekov, Farman Narimanbekov, after graduating from the energy faculty of Toulouse University in 1929, returned to Baku and stood at the origins of the construction of Mingechevir hydroelectric power station.

==== Repression and rehabilitation ====
Many of the graduates of Western universities who returned to Azerbaijan were arrested in the 1930s by the NKVD as German spies and supporters of the restoration of Azerbaijan's independence. According to the analysis of archival materials about the repressed, in the 1930s, citizens of the republic were suspected of dissent and espionage to some degree if they were connected with Germany or knew at least one person of German nationality in Azerbaijan. In all investigative cases, the direction to study in Germany during the ADR years in the records of the NKVD sounded like a crime: "Was sent by the Musavat government to study in Germany"

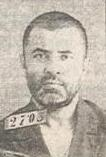
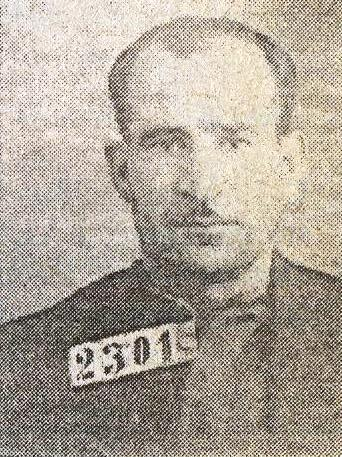
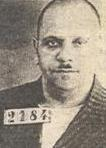
Arrested graduates of German universities.
From left to right: Yusuf Agasibeyli, Ashraf Aliyev and Teymur Aslanov

In 1937, Yusuf Agasibeyli was arrested as a member of the Anti-Soviet Insurrectionary Movement. Ashraf Aliyev, arrested in 1936 by the NKVD, was accused of espionage for Germany and anti-Soviet statements. In 1937, he was involved in the second case as an active member of the rebel organization, whose goal was to overthrow Soviet power in Azerbaijan and separate it from the USSR. On 18 October 1937, Teymur Aslanov was arrested, accused of participation in a nationalist rebel organization and espionage activities in favor of German intelligence, and was sent to a camp in Siberia. Samandar Akhundov was arrested by the GPU in 1933. Bahram Huseynzade, whose wife was a German citizen and was forced to return to Germany in 1938, was sentenced in 1941 by the Supreme Court of the USSR to 15 years in prison as a member of a nationalist rebel organization and a spy for German intelligence. In 1956, the sentence was overturned for lack of corpus delicti.

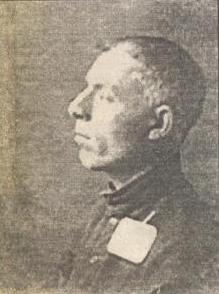
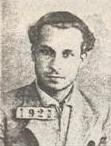
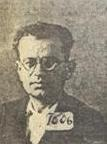
Arrested graduates of German universities.
From left to right: Samandar Akhundov, Bahram Huseynzade and Asildar Muganli

Asildar Muganli was arrested because he was singing German songs in his house. During interrogation, the NKVD investigator stated the authorities knew songs were sung in German at Muganly's apartment, Makhish Safarov replied: "Yes, sometimes we sang German songs, but they were not of political content". Muganly was arrested for the first time in 1933, since 1934 he was a teacher of German at universities in Baku, and the second time he was arrested by the NKVD in 1935 and exiled to Karaganda region. Makhish Safarov was arrested by the NKVD in 1936, and only in 1957, after appealing to the Supreme Court of the USSR with a request to reconsider the case, he was rehabilitated. In 1935, Iskenderbek Sultanov was arrested by the NKVD.

The Bolsheviks repressed those whom the ADR government sent to study in Germany and citizens sent on a mission in the first years of Sovietization. Among them was Ali Rza Atayev, who graduated from the University of Leipzig, and after returning home in 1925, he went from assistant professor of the Department of Obstetrics and Gynecology of the Azerbaijan Medical Institute to professor and head of the obstetric and gynecological clinic of the Azerbaijan Institute for Advanced Medical Studies, and in 1929 he received Doctor of Medicine degree.

Farman Narimanbekov was also repressed. He was taken away at night from the construction site of Mingechevir hydroelectric power station, where he was then working. After the amnesty, he returned to Mingachevir and was a power engineer. On 22 August 1937, breeder Ahmed Rajabli was arrested and exiled to a camp of the GULAG, Magadan Correctional Labor Camp, and there, in the harsh conditions, he created a subsidiary farm, where he bred frost-resistant varieties of vegetable crops. In 1946, he was released and returned home where he continued his research.
