= Zeynal bey Vazirov =

Azerbaijani politician

- Born: Zeynal bey Mirza Hamid bey oglu Vazirov; 1854; Shusha, Shemakha Governorate, Russian Empire
- Died: 1933 (aged 78–79); Baku, Azerbaijani SSR
- Occupations: Statesman and politician

Zeynal bey Vazirov (Azerbaijani: Zeynal bəy Mirzə Həmid bəy oğlu Vəzirov; b. 1854, Shusha, Shemakha Governorate, Russian Empire - d. 1933, Baku, Azerbaijani SSR) was a public figure and member of the parliament of the Azerbaijan Democratic Republic.

== Life ==
Zeynal bey Vezirov was born in 1854 in the city of Shusha, Shusha uezd, Shemakha Governorate (later renamed Baku) of the Russian Empire. He graduated from the Russian-Tatar (Azerbaijani) school. He worked in the Court of Appeal of the city of Elisavetpol (now Ganja). From there he was transferred to the position of clerk in the office of the military governor of Kars. After serving in Kars, Zeynal bey returned to Elisavetpol, where he worked as a translator. After working there for some time, he returned to the city of Shusha. After the establishment of the Azerbaijan Democratic Republic, he became a member of parliament from the Ittihad faction.

His wife Durnis Khanum Vazirov was the daughter of Hashim Bek Vezirov. He and his wife were from the Vazirov family. They had 5 children: Allahyar bey, Aslan bey, Hamid bey, Rena Khanym and Leyla Khanym.

He died in the city of Baku in 1933.

== Sources ==
- Çingizoğlu, Ənvər (2004). Hacılılar. Baku: Soy.
- Азербайджанская Демократическая Республика (1918―1920). Законодательные акты. (Сборник документов). Baku. 1998.
