= Mirza Jamal Javanshir =

Author of the Tarikh-e Qarabagh ("History of Karabakh")

- Born: 1773 Khajalu, Karabakh Khanate, Zand Iran
- Died: April 13, 1853 (aged 79–80) Khajalu, Russian Empire
- Notable works: Tarikh-e Qarabagh
- Relatives: Vazirovs

Mirza Jamal Javanshir (Persian: میرزا جمال جوانشیر, Russian: Мирза Джамал Джеваншир) was a secretary and historian under the Karabakh Khanate and later the Russian Empire. He is principally known as the author of the Persian-language historical chronicle Tarikh-e Qarabagh ("History of Karabakh").

== Background and early life ==
A member of the Turkic Javanshir tribe of the Karabakh region, Mirza Jamal was born in 1773 in the Khajalu village of the Javanshir district near the Armenian melikdom of Dizak. At the time, Karabakh was controlled by the Javanshir-ruled Karabakh Khanate, which was then under the suzerainty of the Zand ruler of Iran, Karim Khan Zand (r. 1751–1779). Mirza Jamal was the son of Mohammad Khan Beg and grandson of Salif Beg Minbashi, both whom had served as the leader of the Javanshir tribe and the commander of the Shusha fortress. Mirza Jamal was educated in Persian and Turkish, and by the time he was fifteen years old, the Karabakh khan Ibrahim Khalil Khan appointed him as one of his dabir (scribes) of the chancery.

== Career ==
=== Under the khans of Karabakh ===
Map of the Karabakh Khanate

He fled together with the khan's family to Khunzakh, in 1797, when Aga Mohammad Khan, angered by the betrayal of Ibrahim Khalil Khan and other khans in the Caucasus, attacked and captured Shusha. He became secretary of Bike (Bakhtika) khanum and started to learn Arabic and Avar languages. Meanwhile Agha Mohammad Khan was assassinated in Shusha five days after its capture. Molla Panah Vagif, khan's vizier was captured by Muhammad bey, son of Mehrali bey and claimant to throne after few days. Ibrahim, who had fled to his in-laws in Avar Khanate, then returned to Shusha and gave Aga Mohammad Khan an honourable burial. In order to retain his position and ensure peaceful relations with the shah, he gave one of his daughters to Agha Mohammad Khan's successor to the throne, Fat′h Ali Shah Qajar. Panah Vagif's position was filled by Mirza Jamal Javanshir, who began to act as his vizier.

He accompanied Mammad Hasan agha Javanshir as his secretary during Russo-Persian War of 1804–1813, witnessed battle of Khonashen. Tsitsianov's death on 20 February 1806 in Baku and the breakup of the Russian offensive persuaded Ibrahim Khalil Khan, in the summer of 1806, to repudiate his allegiance to the Russians, and resubmit himself to the shah; he then asked the shah for aid in ousting the Russian garrison. As the Persian army approached Shusha, Ibrahim Khan left the fortress and camped outside. On 12 June 1806, the Russians, instigated by Ibrahim Khalil Khan's grandson and fearful of their own vulnerability, attacked the camp and killed Ibrahim Khan, one of his wives, a daughter, and his youngest son. To gain support from the local Muslims, the Russians appointed a son of Ibrahim Khalil, Mehdi Qoli Khan Javanshir, as khan of Karabakh. Mirza Jamal remained in service of Mehdi Qoli Khan until 1822 when the khan fled to Iran. The khanate was subsequently abolished and transformed into a province of the Russian Empire.

=== Under the Russian Empire ===
Mirza Jamal later was appointed by the Russian commandant of Shusha to the post of secretary, in which he served various Russian commanders.

During the Russo-Persian War of 1826–1828, Mirza Jamal was part of the entourage of the Russian general Valerian Madatov when crossed the Araxes river. There, Mirza Jamal and his nephew Karim Beg succeeded in transporting all the inhabitants of the Sayyed-Ahmadlu village to Dizak. In 1840, Mirza Jamal went into retirement once again, which led to his pension being taken from him, in turn leading to economic issues. This persisted until the late 1840s, when he was given the income of Karga-bazar village by Mikhail Semyonovich Vorontsov, the Russian Viceroy of the Caucasus.

Aside from his proficiency in Persian and Turkish, Mirza Jamal also had an understanding of the Lezgian and Avar languages. He also had some astronomical expertise and an exceptional mastery in both history and geography. He is said to have written Persian poetry and to have knowledge of medicine. On 13 April 1853, he died in the Khajalu village. 13th First Secretary of the Azerbaijan Communist Party Abdurrahman Vazirov was his great-grandson.

== Work ==
Mirza Jamal is principally known for composing the historical chronicle Tarikh-e Qarabagh ("History of Karabakh"), which he had done under the orders of Vorontsov. Mirza Jamal already had an abstract of the book beforehand, in which he added some brief chapters, an introduction and conclusion, in order to appease Mikhail and recover his pension. The book focuses on the history of Karabakh, starting from the Muslim conquests and concluding with the conquest of the Russian Empire. However, it mainly focuses on the period starting from the reign of Nader Shah (r. 1736–1747) until the death of Ibrahim Khalil Khan in 1806.

The book was written in Persian, which served as the administrative and literary language of Karabakh until the end of the 19th-century.

The Armenian-American historian Robert H. Hewsen considers this work an output of Azerbaijani historiography as the author was born in modern-day Azerbaijan. (Note: Before 1918, Azerbaijanis were generally known as "Tatars". This term, employed by the Russians, referred to Turkic-speaking Muslims of the South Caucasus. After 1918, with the establishment of the Azerbaijan Democratic Republic and "especially during the Soviet era", the Tatar group identified itself as "Azerbaijani".)

== Sources ==
- Bournoutian, George (1994). A History of Qarabagh: An Annotated Translation of Mirza Jamal Javanshir Qarabaghi's Tarikh-e Qarabagh. Mazda Publishers. ISBN 978-1-56859-011-0.
- Bournoutian, George (2008). "Javānšir Qarābāḡi, Jamāl". In Yarshater, Ehsan (ed.). Encyclopædia Iranica. Vol. XIV/6: Japan IV. Iranians in Japan–Jobbāʾi. London and New York: Routledge & Kegan Paul. pp. 445–465. ISBN 978-1-934283-07-3.
- Bournoutian, George (2021). From the Kur to the Aras: A Military History of Russia's Move into the South Caucasus and the First Russo-Iranian War, 1801–1813. Brill. ISBN 978-90-04-44515-4.
- Hewsen, Robert H. (1995). "Review: George A. Bournoutian, A History of Qarabagh: An Annotated Translation of Mirza Jamal Javanshir Qarabaghi's Tarikh-e Qarabagh". Journal of the Society for Armenian Studies. 6. Society for Armenian Studies.
- Bournoutian, George A. (2018). Armenia and Imperial Decline: The Yerevan Province, 1900–1914. Milton Park, Abingdon, Oxon: Routledge. ISBN 978-1-351-06260-2. OCLC 1037283914.
- Tsutsiev, Arthur (2014). Atlas of the Ethno-Political History of the Caucasus (PDF). Translated by Nora Seligman Favorov. New Haven: Yale University Press. ISBN 9780300153088. Archived (PDF) from the original on 17 June 2023.
