= Bakhish bey Sabur =

Azerbaijani poet

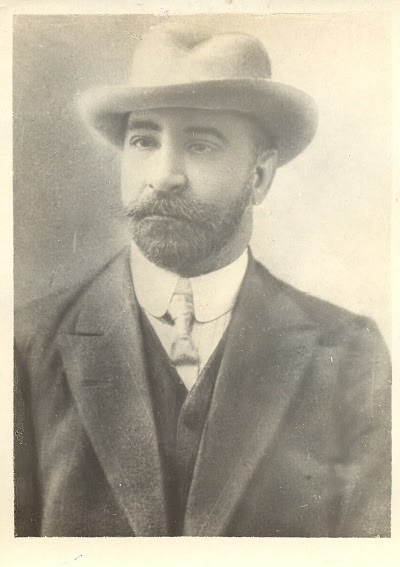
- Born: 1863; Shusha uezd, Elizavetpol Governorate, Russian Empire
- Died: August 27, 1931 (aged 67–68); Shusha, Shusha uezd, Elizavetpol Governorate, Russian Empire
- Resting place: Tashkent
- Occupation: Poet
- Writing career
- Language: Azerbaijani

Bakhish bey Sabur or Bakhish bey Vazirov (Azerbaijani: Baxış bəy Əsəd bəy oğlu Vəzirov; b. 27 August 1863, Mirzəcamallı, Shusha uezd, Elizavetpol Governorate, Russian Empire — d. 1931, Tashkent, Uzbek Soviet Socialist Republic, USSR) was an Azerbaijani poet and a member of the literary society "Majlisi-Faramushan". He was from the family of Karabakh, the Vazirovs.

== Life ==
Bakhish bey Vazirov was born on August 27, 1863, in the village of Mirzajamally (Sharifbeyli) of the Varanda district in the Shusha uezd to the family of the poet and physician Asad bey Vazirov. He graduated from the Shusha Realni School. Bakhish bey knew several languages. He moved to Tashkent after working for some time in government institutions in Shusha and Baku. According to Salman Mumtaz, who described his stay in Tashkent, "it was a valuable contribution to education and culture." Bakhish bey wrote his works under the pseudonym "Sabur." The poet passed away in Tashkent in 1931.

Mir Mohsun Navvab wrote the following about him in his famous anthology:

Bakhish bey is the son of Asad bey. He is from the population of Shusha in Karabakh. He is the younger brother of Bahram bey Fedai, the nephew of Asi, and the grandson of Zakir. He is a cheerful young man of 28 years. He knows Persian and Russian. He is new to poetry. The following poems are his. His pen name is Sabur.

== Sources ==
- Nəvvab, Mir Möhsün (1995), Təzkireyi-Nəvvab (PDF), Baku: Azərnəşr
- Çingizoğlu, Ənvər (2004), Hacılılar, Baku: Soy, №6
