= Ahmed Rajabli =

Azerbaijani geneticist and agronomist

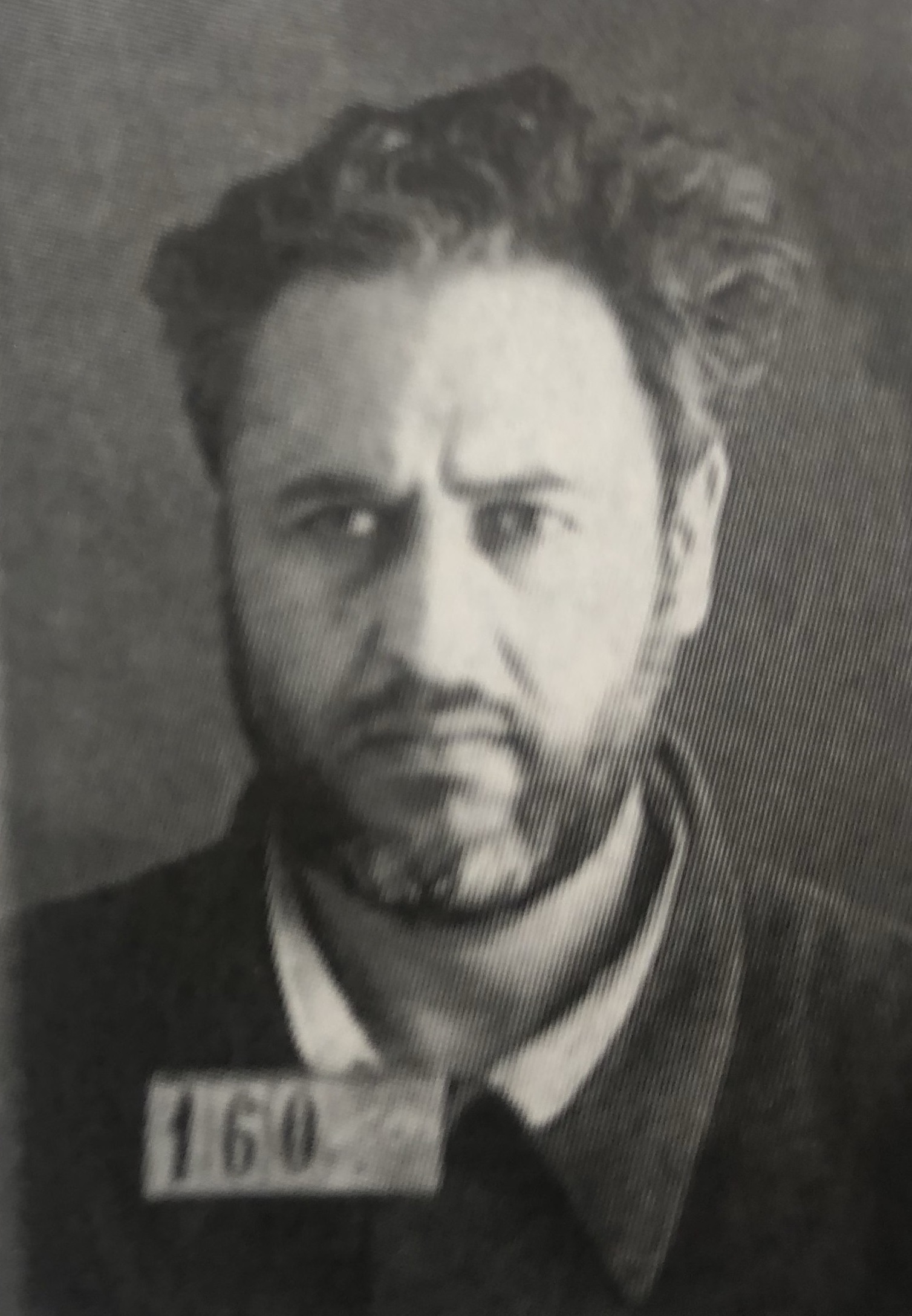
- Rajabli in 1937
- Born: Ahmed Jabbar oghlu Rajabli; 28 September 1898; Yerevan, Erivan uezd, Erivan Governorate, Russian Empire
- Died: 15 December 1963 (aged 65); Moscow, Russian SFSR, Soviet Union
- Citizenship: Soviet Union
- Education: Higher Royal Institute of Experimental Agriculture (now University of Perugia)
- Relatives: Agasalim Atakishiyev (co-father-in-law)
- Scientific career
- Fields: Agronomy; Genetics
- Workplaces: Azerbaijan State Agricultural University; Lenin All-Union Academy of Agricultural Sciences

Ahmed Rajabli (Azerbaijani: Əhməd Cabbar oğlu Rəcəbli; 28 September 1898 – 15 December 1963) was an Azerbaijani and Soviet agronomist, geneticist, pedagogue, professor, Republic student and member of the VASKhNIL. He devoted his life to the study of fruit and cereal crops available in Azerbaijan.

== Biography ==
=== Early years and education: 1898–1923 ===
Ahmed Rajabli was born on 28 September 1898 to Mashadi Jabbar Mashadi Jafar oghlu and Kubra khanim Haji Khalil gizi. On 15 September 1907, he entered the Classical Russian Gymnasium in Erevan and graduated from the eight-year course with a silver medal. In 1918, Rajabli became proofreader of a new newspaper, the Azərbaycan füqərası (Azerbaijani poor). The establishment of the Azerbaijan Democratic Republic turned out to be an important part of his education path. Soon after, the State Scholarship Programme commenced in 1919 and was funded by the Parliament of the Azerbaijan Democratic Republic. The stated objective of the scheme was to build a network of local scientists studied in Europe, who would serve four years in Azerbaijan after graduation. Rajabli was one of the award-winning candidates. He had learned Russian, Italian, German, Spanish, Greek and Persian. He arrived in Perugia, Italy matriculating in the Higher Royal Institute of Experimental Agriculture founded in 1896. Forty years later in 1936, the institute was transformed into the Faculty of Agriculture under University of Perugia.

=== Zagatala: 1924–1930 ===
In 1923, after graduation Ahmed Rajabli returned to Baku and got an offer from the land commissariat. However, at his own request, the biologist was sent to Zagatala, where he found favorable conditions for natural selection activities, and started working as an agronomist there. A year later Rajabli founded the Zagatala Technical School of Agriculture and headed the educational institution until 1937, at the same time working as a consultant at the Zagatala Hazelnut Refinery.

Ahmed Rajabli met his wife, Fahima Mehdibeyova, while living in Zagatala. The person acquainted Fahima with Ahmed was Badisabah khanim, widowed wife of Firidun bey Kocharli. Soon after, they married. In 1928, Fahima gave birth to the couple's first child, Nigar. Their second child, Khalida, was born in 1930.

=== Political eclipse and persecution ===
In 1930–1936, Ahmed Rajabli worked as an associate professor and head of the department at the Azerbaijan Agricultural Institute, and in 1931–1934, he also worked as the head of the southern lands section of the institute. In 1935, he received the title of professor by the decision of the Higher Attestation Commission. Later, Rajabli was elected a member of the Subtropical Plants Department headed by academician Nikolai Vavilov at the Lenin All-Union Academy of Agricultural Sciences in Leningrad.

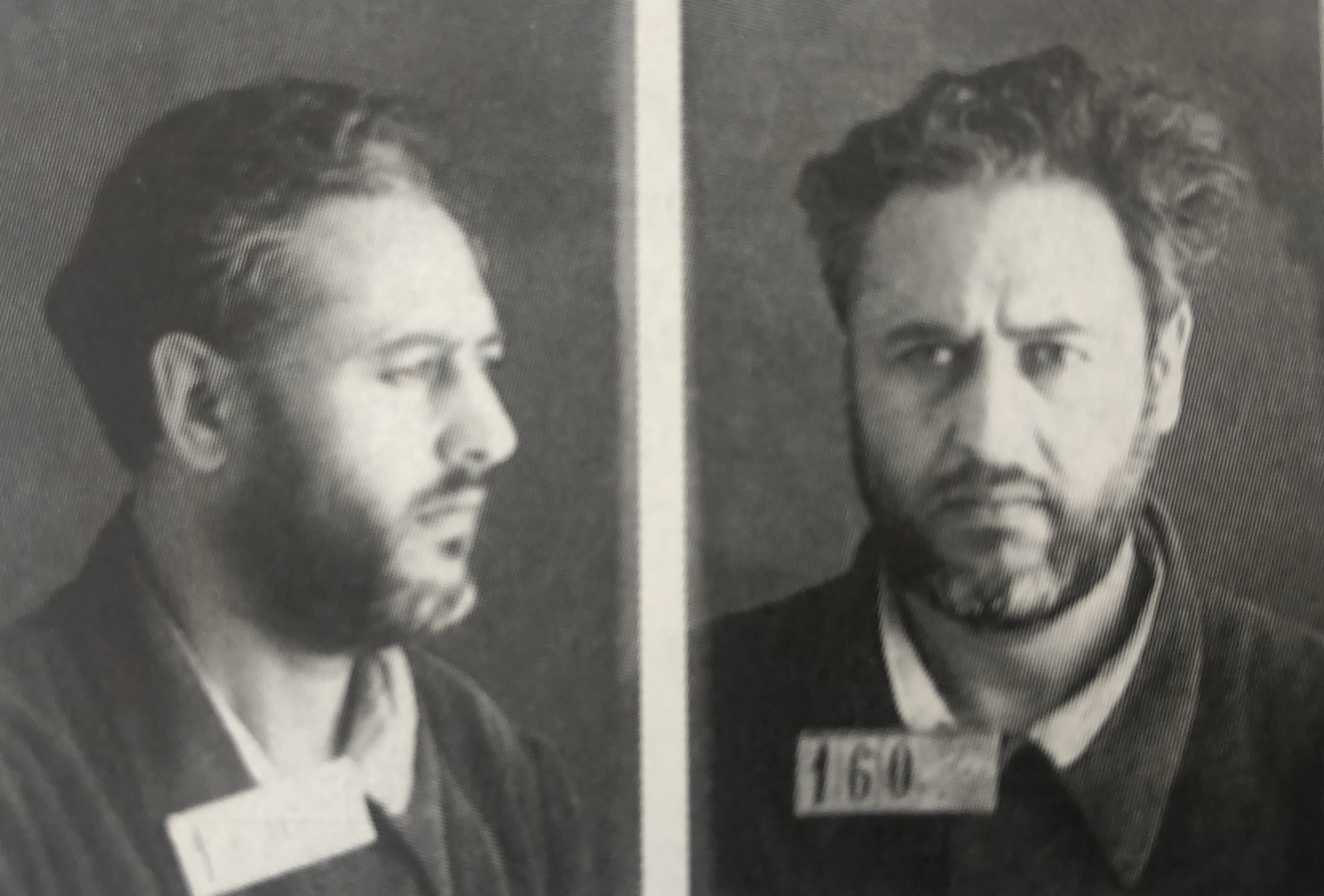
NKVD photo of Ahmed Rajabli, 1937

At the outset of the Great Purge, while defending his PhD thesis in 1937, Rajabli was accused of "counter-revolutionary activity" on the grounds of studying abroad and sent to Magadan, one of the Gulag labor camps, for eight years. He spent the first three years in Kolyma, also known as "the land of white death", where he began to grow new tomato cultivars in the auxiliary farm of the USSR People's Commissariat of Internal Affairs. While in Magadan, Ahmed Rajabli wrote the historical novel Babek and sent his work to Azerbaijan in parts with the released prisoners. This novel is considered the first literary work dedicated to Babek in the history of Azerbaijani prose literature.

After Rajabli had been arrested, Fahima moved to Baku where she worked as a physics teacher at Azerbaijan State University, however, soon after, she was expelled from the university. Rajabli returned from exile in 1945. Then situation had changed vastly. Fahima defended her doctoral thesis on "Monocrystals and their dependence on the temperature regime" and earned the title of the first female candidate of sciences in the field of physics in Azerbaijan. Meanwhile, Rajabli had been working on actual topics on fruit industry of the country. He introduced new fruit varieties in Shirvan, Nakhchivan, Guba, Khachmaz and Karabakh, and improved canning industry, also prepared a monograph entitled "Varieties of fruit plants in Azerbaijan" and compiled a textbook ordered by the Ministry of Agriculture. The monograph was published in 1966, as Rajabli's posthumous book. Despite his scientific contributions, on 22 March 1950, Rajabli was arrested again and sent to Jambyl, Kazakhstan. After four years, following Stalin's death, his reputation was publicly rehabilitated and he was allowed to be back to Azerbaijan.

=== After release ===
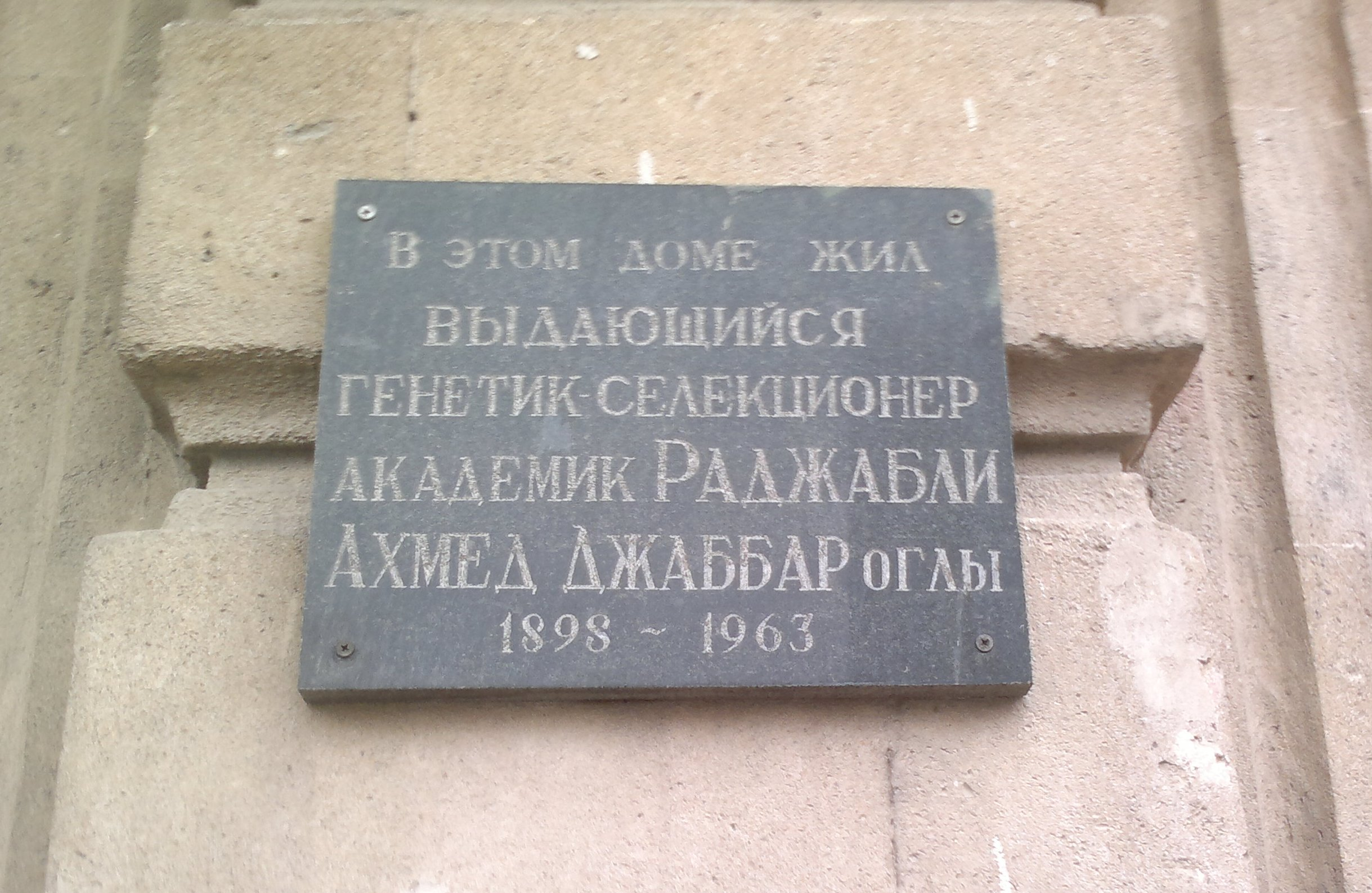
Plaque in tribute to Ahmed Rajabli, at 126 Mirzaaga Aliyev Street in Baku

After Ahmed Rajabli was released from the camp, he was appointed head of the Fruit Growing Department of the Azerbaijan Scientific-Research Institute of Perennial Plants. The scientist had been arrested under the name of "enemy of the people" in accordance with the warrant signed by Agasalim Atakishiyev, the Minister of Internal Affairs of Azerbaijan SSR at that time. Nevertheless, afterwards Rajabli consented to the marriage of his daughter Khalida with the minister's son Tofig. The couple got married secretly in 1952. Six years later Rajabli was elected an academician of the Azerbaijan Academy of Agricultural Sciences.

On 15 December 1963, Ahmed Rajabli died of a heart attack in Moscow. He was buried in Baku. The gravesite of his co-father-in-law, Major general Agasalim Atakishiyev, who died in 1970, is at the same cemetery in Mashtaga where Rajabli was buried.

== Legacy ==
In 1992, the Scientific Research Institute of Horticulture and Subtropical Plants in Guba was named after Ahmed Rajabli and a bust was placed in the lobby. In the same year, one of the streets located in Narimanov District, Baku, was named in his honor. In 1998, on the eve of the 100th anniversary of the birth of Ahmed Rajabli, a commemorative plaque was unveiled on the building where he lived, now located at 126 Mirzaaga Aliyev Street.
