= Suleyman Vazirov =

Soviet Azerbaijani bureaucrat (1910–1973)

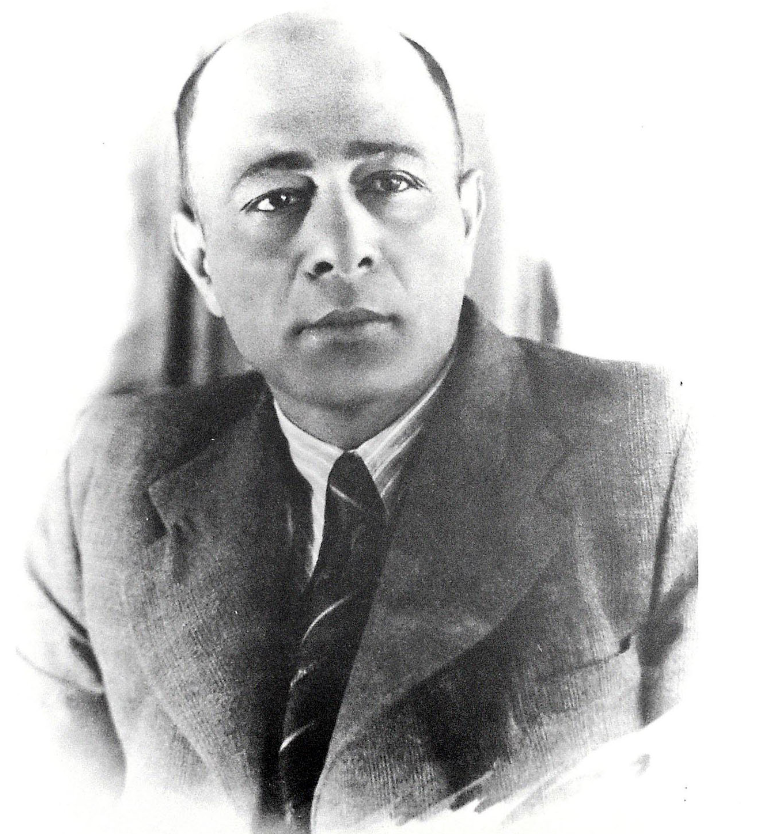

Minister of Oil Industry of the Azerbaijan SSR
- In office 1954–1959
- Succeeded by: Anvar Alikhanov

Personal details
- Born: 18 November 1910 Shusha, Elisavetpol Governorate, Caucasus Viceroyalty
- Died: 7 February 1973 (aged 62) Baku, Azerbaijan SSR, Soviet Union
- Resting place: Alley of Honor, Baku
- Party: Communist Party of the Soviet Union
- Awards: Hero of Socialist Labour

Suleyman Azad oghlu Vazirov (Azerbaijani: Süleyman Azad oğlu Vəzirov, Russian: Сулейман Азадович Везиров; 18 November 1910 – 7 February 1973) was a Soviet Azerbaijani bureaucrat who was the first Minister of Oil Industry of the Azerbaijan Soviet Socialist Republic, serving from 1954 to 1959.

== Biography ==
Suleyman Vazirov was born in 1910 in Shusha to the Vazirov family. His father, Azad bey Vazirov, received military training in Saint Petersburg and was a rittmeister, and her mother, Zahra khanum, was the daughter of the famous doctor of his time, Karim bey Mehmandarov. Suleyman Vazirov studied at the Shusha Real School, then entered the Baku Industrial and Economic College. In addition to studying at the technical school, he was also working as a cinema mechanic's assistant. After graduating from technical school, he began working in Bibi-Heybat oil rig.

In 1928, he entered the mining faculty of Azerbaijan Technical University, which he graduated in 1932. He served as head of the Main Directorate for Oil Production in the Southern and Western Regions of the USSR MNP (1946-1949), Minister of the Oil Industry (1954-1959), Chairman of the National Economy Council (1959-1965), Deputy Chairman of the Council of Ministers (1965-1970), Deputy Chairman of the Presidium of the Supreme Soviet of the Azerbaijan SSR (1970-1973).

Besides that he was an elected a member of the Central Committee of the Communist Party of Azerbaijan and the Central Committee of the Communist Party of Turkmenistan. He served as deputy of the Supreme Soviet of the USSR of the 3rd, 5th and 6th convocations (in 1950-1954 and 1958-1966), the Azerbaijan SSR of the 4th, 7th and 8th convocations (in 1955-1959 and since 1967) ...

He died on 7 February 1973, after a long illness. He was buried in Baku on the Alley of Honor.

== Family ==
He was married to Valida Vazirova (1920-2012), daughter of Rashid bey Akhundzadeh, Governor of Baku in 1919 during Azerbaijan Democratic Republic. Together they had:

- Shamil Vazirov (1942-2001) - Doctor of Chemical Sciences, Professor
- Murad Vazirov (1947-1996)
- Rauf Vazirov - married to Fidan Rzayeva, daughter of Rasul Rza and Nigar Rafibeyli in 1968

== Awards ==
- Hero of Socialist Labor (24 January 1944)
- Order of Lenin (27.4.1940; 24.1.1944; 8.1.1948; 19.3.1959 - four times)
- Order of the Red Banner of Labor (6/6/1942; 1/28/1950; 5/15/1951; 12/10/1960; 5/23/1966; 8/25/1971 - six times)
- Stalin Prize of the third degree (1951) - for the discovery and development of a new oil field
- Medal "For Valiant Labour in the Great Patriotic War 1941–1945"
- Jubilee Medal "In Commemoration of the 100th Anniversary of the Birth of Vladimir Ilyich Lenin"
