= Aslan bey Vazirzade =

- Aslan bəy Vəzirzadə
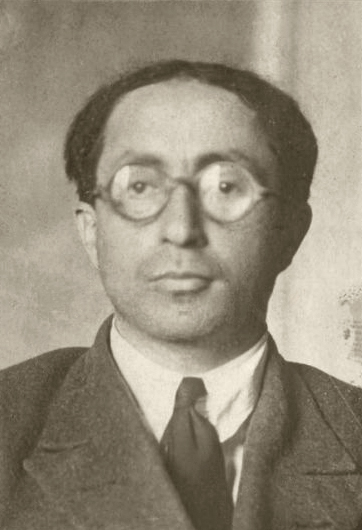
- Aslan bey Vezirzade
- Born: Aslan bey Vazirzade or Aslan bey Vazirov; 6 December 1898; Baku
- Died: 1 April 1984 (86 years old); Baku
- Other names: Aslan bey Zeynalabdin bey oglu Vazirzade
- Citizenship: Russian Empire Azerbaijan Democratic Republic Soviet Union
- Parents: Zeynalabdin Bey Vazirov (father); Durnisa Hashim Bey qizi Vazirova (mother)
- Scientific career
- Fields: Mineralogy Crystallography

Aslan bey Vazirzade or Aslan bey Vazirov (full name: Aslan bey Zeynalabdin bey oglu Vazirzade; January 6, 1898, Baku - 1984, Baku) — one of the students of the Republic, Azerbaijani mineralogist, crystallographer and professor. Honored Scientist of the Azerbaijan SSR, philatelist. For some time, he headed the Azerbaijan Society of Philatelists

== Early life ==
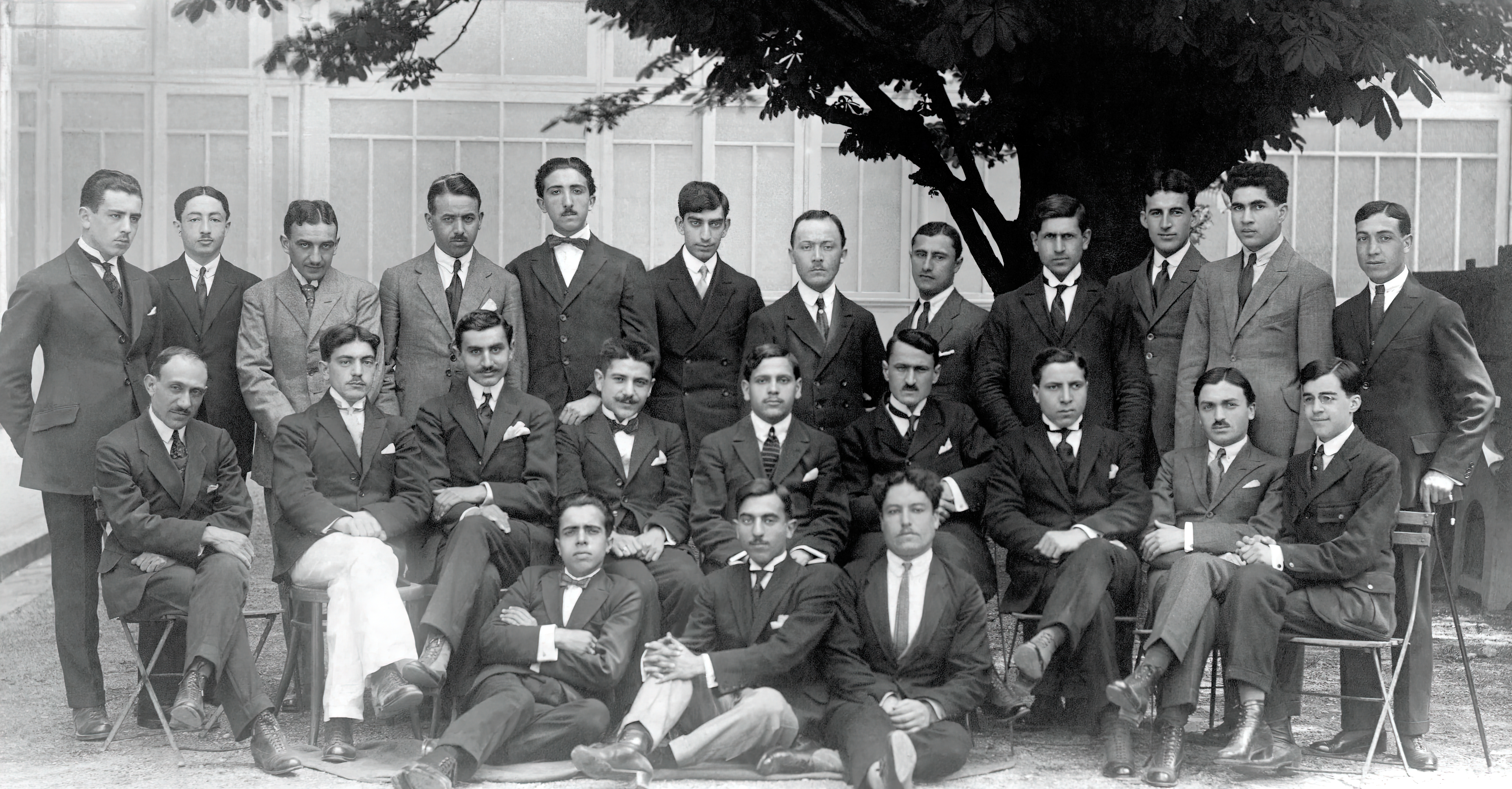
Republic students celebrate the day of the establishment of ADR. May 28, 1920. Aslan Bey Vazirzade, second from the left in the back row

Aslan bey Zeynalabdin bey oglu Vezirzade was born on December 6, 1898. In 1915, he graduated from the Baku Real school with a gold medal and entered the St. Petersburg Mining University. He left his studies due to the events that took place there and returned to Baku in 1917. He became a member of the Muslim Social Democratic Party in Baku.

Azerbaijan Democratic Republic was founded on May 28, 1918. In 1919, the Ministry of Public Education of the Azerbaijan Democratic Republic submitted to the Parliament of the Azerbaijan Democratic Republic a draft law on sending 100 students to Europe for education. On September 1, 1919, a law was passed and 7 million rubles were allocated from the State Treasurer of Azerbaijan to the Minister of Education for sending applicants and students to foreign universities in the 1919–1920 school year.

In January 1920, candidates left Baku for Batumi and from Batumi for Rome. Aslan bey Vezirzade was one of the selected student. He was a philatelist numismatist in this period. While in Batumi, he collected stamps from his youth and bought several sheets of local stamps. When Vezirov arrived in Rome, the stamps he acquired in Batumi were no longer valid due to the political situation in the Caucasus. That is why these stamps began to be considered a rare finding. While in Rome, Aslan Bey fell seriously ill and could not leave the city. He provided living and medical expenses by selling the rare stamps he got from Batumi at a high price.

After his recovery, Bey Aslan came to Paris and began studying at the Faculty of Mathematics and Chemistry of the University of Paris. Later, he continued his studies at the Faculty of Geology at the University of Nancy. After the April invasion of the 11th Red Army, students' scholarships were cut, and their difficulties began. The students had to either return to their homeland or study on their own. Bey Aslan continued his education by doing random jobs along with his studies. During the holidays, he worked in the coal mines to earn money.

In 1925, Aslan Bey Vazirzade returned to Baku. In addition to geological exploration work in the Azneft office, he also began teaching at the Azerbaijan Polytechnic Institute (now the Azerbaijan State Oil and Industry University), which was founded in 1920 on the basis of the Baku Technical School. He taught at this university until the end of his life.

In 1930, he received the scientific title of professor and headed the department of crystallography, mineralogy and petrography of the institute. When the institute was divided into two independent higher schools, he continued his pedagogical activities at the Azerbaijan Industrial Institute, majoring in oil and chemistry. Several generations have played a major role in the development of highly qualified specialists, doctors of sciences, and academics. He was awarded with orders and medals of the USSR.

He died on April 1, 1984.

== Family ==
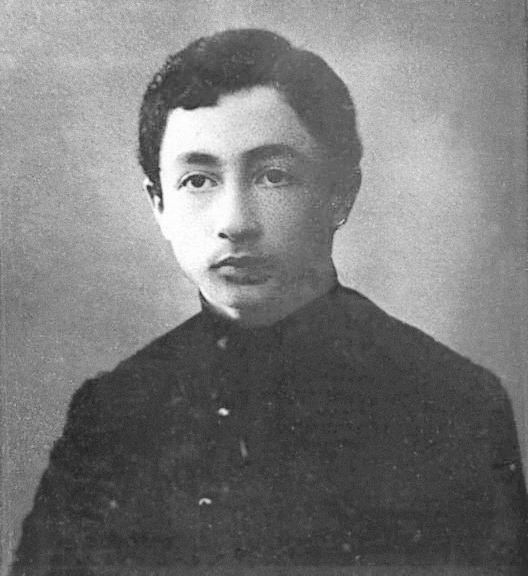
Aslan Bey Vazirzade in Petersburg. 1917

Aslan Bey Vazirov's father, Zeynalabdin Bey Vazirov, was from the Shusha branch of the Vazirovs, and his mother, Durnisa Hashim Bey's daughter Vazirova, was from the Fuzuli branch of the Vazirovs. His father was the uncle of Suleyman Vazirov, the 1st Minister of Oil Industry of the Azerbaijan SSR, Hero of Socialist Labor. They had five children from their marriage. Allahyar, Aslan, Hamid, Rena and Leyla. Aslan Bey himself started his life with Khasmammadova, daughter of Nurush Khanum Alasgar Bey. In 1930, their son Farid was born. His son Farid became a geologist like his father.

== See also ==
- Students of Azerbaijan Democratic Republic abroad
