= Hamida Javanshir =

Azerbaijani philanthropist and women's rights activist (1873–1955)

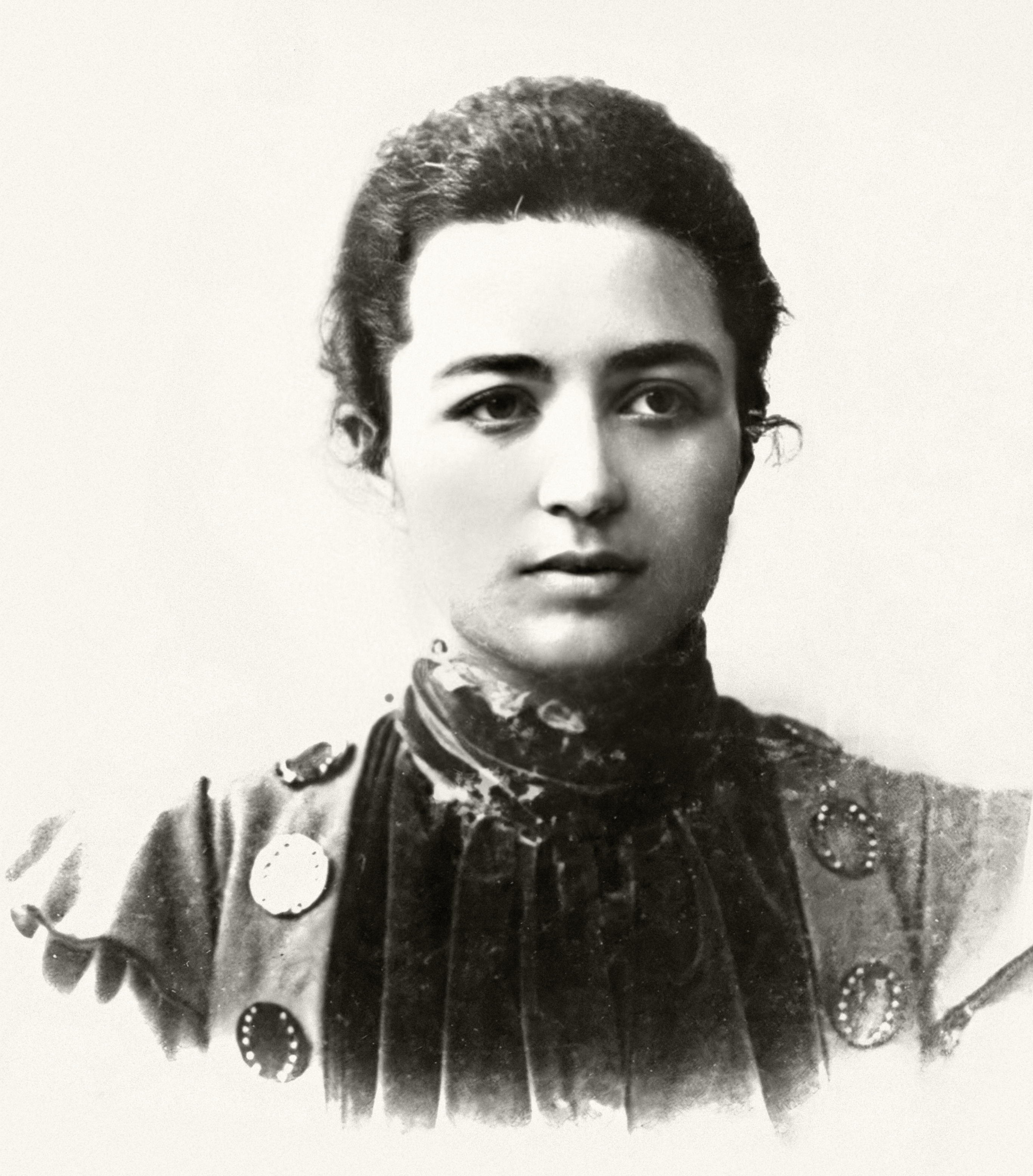
- Javanshir, c. 1890s
- Born: 19 January 1873; Kahrizli, near Agjabadi, Russian Empire (now Kahrizli, Azerbaijan)
- Died: 6 February 1955 (aged 82); Baku, Azerbaijan SSR, Soviet Union (now Baku, Azerbaijan)
- Other name: Hamideh Khanum Javanshir
- Occupations: Writer, activist, philanthropist
- Spouses: Ibrahim bey Davatdarov (m. 1889; died 1901) Jalil Mammadguluzadeh (m. 1907; died 1932)
- Children: Mina Davatdarova; Muzaffar Davatdarov; Midhat Mammadguluzadeh; Anvar Mammadguluzadeh

Hamida Ahmad bey qizi Javanshir (Azerbaijani: Həmidə Cavanşir; 19 January 1873 – 6 February 1955) was an Azerbaijani activist and one of the first enlightened women of Azerbaijan, wife of Jalil Mammadguluzadeh, daughter of historian Ahmad Bey Javanshir, philanthropist, translator, and member of Azerbaijan Writers' Union.

== Early life ==
Born on her family's ancestral estate in the village of Kahrizli, Hamida Javanshir was the eldest child of Ahmad bey Javanshir (1828–1903), an Azeri historian, translator and officer of the Russian Imperial army, and his wife Mulkijahan. She was the great-great-grandniece of Ibrahim Khalil Khan, the last ruling khan of the Karabakh Khanate. Hamida and her younger brother were educated at home; when she was nine, a family of Russian tutors came to live with them to guide their education. By age 14, she was familiar with European and Islamic literature, and spoke Russian and French fluently.

In 1889, Hamida Javanshir married a Barda-native, Lieutenant Colonel Ibrahim bey Davatdarov. They settled in Brest-Litovsk (present-day Brest, Belarus). Soon their two children, Mina and Muzaffar, were born. Javanshir took ballroom dance lessons and studied German and Polish. In 1900, the family moved to Kars, where Davatdarov was appointed commander of a military fortress. A year later, he died and Hamida's aims to study medicine in Moscow seemed unrealizable.

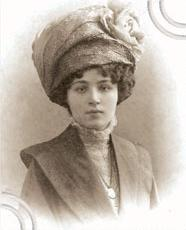
Hamida Javanshir's daughter Mina Davatdarova was a professional teacher who volunteered at the Kahrizli school until her death in 1923

== Later life and activism ==
She inherited the Kahrizli estate from her father and continued his successful cotton business. In accordance with his will, she took the manuscript of his historical work On the Political Affairs of the Karabakh khanate in 1747–1805 to Tiflis (present-day Tbilisi, Georgia) in order to get it printed at the Geyrat publishing house. There, in October 1905, she met Jalil Mammadguluzadeh, who then was a columnist for the Azeri-language newspaper Sharg-i rus. In 1907, they married (Mammadguluzadeh was twice-widowed at the time) and lived in Tiflis until 1920. They had two sons – Midhat, born in 1908, and Anvar, born in 1911. She worked with Mammadguluzadeh to publish Molla Nasraddin, a satirical magazine.

During the Karabakh famine of 1907, Javanshir distributed flour and millet to starving villagers and also acted as a mediator between local Armenians and Azeris after two years of reciprocal massacres. In 1908, she founded a coeducational school in her home village of Kahrizli, which became the first Azeri school where boys and girls could study in the same classroom. In 1910, Javanshir, together with female members of the city's Azeri nobility, founded the Muslim Women's Caucasian Benevolent Society. During a smallpox epidemic in the Soviet era, she bought vaccines and gave shots to the people of Kahrizli.

In 1921, after having lived in Tabriz for a year, the family moved to Baku, where she wrote memoirs and translated her husband's works. She published a memoir in the 1930s, Awake: A Moslem Woman’s Rare Memoir of Her Life and Partnership with the Editor of Molla Nasreddin, the Most Influential Satirical Journal of the Caucasus and Iran, 1907–1931, published posthumously in 1967, and translated into English by Hasan Javadi and Willem Floor. She also translated Russian poetry. She outlived two of her children: Mina (died 1923) and Midhat (died 1932). She died in Baku in 1955. There is a museum of her life and works in Kahrizli.

== See also ==
- Cotton production in Azerbaijan
