= Ahmad bey Javanshir =

Azerbaijani historian (1828–1903)

- Born: March 2, 1828 near Agjabadi, Azerbaijan
- Died: January 9, 1903 (aged 74) near Agjabadi, Azerbaijan
- Occupations: Historian, soldier

Ahmad bey Jafargulu bey oglu Javanshir (Azerbaijani: Əhməd bəy Cavanşir, 2 March 1828 – 9 January 1903) was an Azerbaijani historian and soldier. He was the great-grandnephew of Ibrahim Khalil Khan, the last ruling khan of Karabakh, and the father of philanthropist and feminist Hamida Javanshir.

== Life ==
Little is known about Ahmad bey Javanshir's personal life. His autobiography attached to the manuscript of his work On the Political Affairs of the Karabakh khanate in 1747–1805 disappeared probably between 1905 and 1907. Historians have established that he was born in his family estate of Kahrizli, located near the town of Agjabadi in present-day Azerbaijan. His parents, Jafargulu bey and Zahra khanum descended from Panah Ali Khan, the first khan of Karabakh. Until age 15, Ahmad bey studied at a religious school (mollakhana). The integration of the Azeri upper class into the Imperial Russian political system required among other things the knowledge of the Russian language, which is why Ahmad bey was sent to study to the Pavlov Cadet Corps in Saint Petersburg. Beginning in 1848 he served in a hussar regiment where he was advanced to the rank of Stabs-Captain. In 1853–1854 he participated in the Crimean War. In 1854 he was injured during a duel with Ali bey Sultanov, a fellow officer, and could not continue his military service. After returning to his native village, Ahmad bey Javanshir carried out economic reforms. In the 1860s he built an 8-verst (ca. 8.5 km) irrigation channel across the Mil plain. In the 1880s he was appointed member of the Shusha-based Bey Committee aimed at verifying the claims of some locals of having noble origins (if proven, they were exempt from some taxes according to the Russian law). His denunciations caused resentment among the committee members which led to Javanshir being temporarily imprisoned. Javanshir spent his last years in Kahrizli, engaged in translation of the poems by Pushkin, Lermontov and Zhukovsky into Azeri, as well as writing his own historical work in Russian, entitled On the Political Affairs of the Karabakh khanate in 1747–1805 (1883). It was published two years after his death in the Geyrat publishing house in Tiflis. His other works are Asar-i Ahmad bey Javanshir (a collection of children's poems) and Turk zarb-misallar majmuasi (an explanatory Azeri dictionary).

His works were cited by The Cambridge History of Iran.
