= Mirzəcamallı =

- Location within Azerbaijan Location within Karabakh Economic Region
- Coordinates: 39°36′02″N 47°12′10″E
- Country: Azerbaijan
- District: Fuzuli
- Time zone: UTC+4 (AZT)

Mirzəcamallı (also, Mirzacamallı and Mirzadzhamally) is a village in the Fuzuli District of Azerbaijan.
