= Outline of the Russian Revolution =

Topical guide to Wikipedia articles about the Russian Revolution

Russian Revolution
- Part of the opposition to World War I and the revolutions of 1917–1923
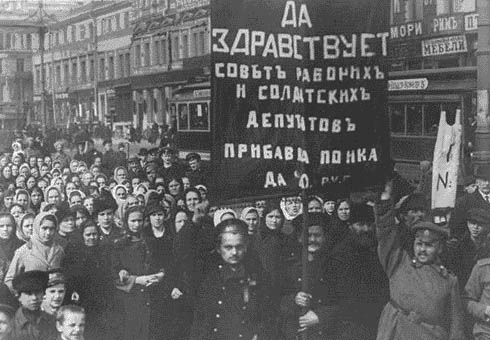
- Date: (8 March [O.S. 23 February] 1917 – 25 October 1922)
- Location: Russia
- Participants: SRs, Kadets, Bolsheviks, Mensheviks, Provisional Govt., army, nationalists (early); Red Army, White Armies, anarchists, Greens, Allies, Central Powers, separatists, Committee of Members of the Constituent Assembly (later)
- Outcome: End of the Russian monarchy; Dissolution of the Russian Empire; Failure of the short-lived Russian Republic and Russian State; End of Russia's involvement in the First World War; Establishment of Bolshevik Soviet republics in Russia proper, most of Ukraine, Belarus, Central Asia and the Southern Caucasus; Independence of Poland, Finland, Estonia, Latvia, and Lithuania; Establishment of the Soviet Union

The following outline is provided as an overview of and topical guide to the Russian Revolution.

The Russian Revolution was a period of political and social upheaval in the Russian Empire that came in two waves, the first in 1905 and the second in 1917. Russia abolished its monarchy and adopted a socialist form of government after two successive revolutions in 1917, the February and October revolutions, and the Russian Civil War that followed. It preceded and helped inspire other revolutions in the aftermath of World War I, among them the German Revolution of 1918–1919, and is counted among the key events of the 20th century.

The Russian Revolution of 1905 had no single leader or organizer. It began on Bloody Sunday, 22 January 1905 [O.S. 9 January], when troops fired on unarmed workers marching to the Winter Palace behind the priest Georgy Gapon to petition Nicholas II for higher wages, shorter hours and civil rights. Strikes, peasant land seizures and mutinies in the army and navy followed through the year, among them the rising on the battleship Potemkin. Peasants wanted land, factory workers wanted better pay and shorter hours, and many wanted legal political parties and an elected parliament. Defeat in the Russo-Japanese War discredited the government further. In October the tsar issued the October Manifesto, which promised civil liberties and an elected Duma. Workers formed the first soviets, among them the Saint Petersburg Soviet, the model for the workers' councils of 1917. The government put down the last risings by 1907 and cut back the Duma's powers, but it settled none of the grievances behind the revolt. They resurfaced under the defeats and shortages of World War I.

The two revolutions of 1917 had different origins. No party planned the February Revolution. It began in Petrograd in February 1917 (Note: February by the Old Style Julian calendar then used in Russia, March by the New Style Gregorian calendar used in the West. Russia kept the Julian calendar until 1918, by which time it ran thirteen days behind; a Sovnarkom decree signed by Lenin closed the gap by dropping 1–13 February 1918, so that 31 January was followed directly by 14 February.) with bread queues, strikes and a women's march, and it succeeded when the city garrison refused to fire and joined the crowds. Nicholas II abdicated and the Russian Provisional Government took office, sharing authority with the Petrograd Soviet. Its cause was the strain of the First World War: heavy casualties, food and fuel shortages, rising prices, and a court that had lost public trust.

The October Revolution in October 1917 (Note: October by the Old Style Julian calendar then used in Russia, November by the New Style Gregorian calendar used in the West. Russia kept the Julian calendar until 1918, by which time it ran thirteen days behind; a Sovnarkom decree signed by Lenin closed the gap by dropping 1–13 February 1918, so that 31 January was followed directly by 14 February.) was planned. The Bolsheviks under Lenin and Trotsky used the Military Revolutionary Committee to take control of the capital and transfer power to the soviets. The new government issued the Decree on Peace and the Decree on Land, dissolved the Constituent Assembly in January 1918, and left the war under the Treaty of Brest-Litovsk. The Russian Civil War followed, and the Bolshevik victory led to the founding of the Soviet Union in 1922.

== Overviews ==
- Russian Revolution
- February Revolution
- Dual power
- October Revolution
- Russian Civil War

== Background ==
- Prague Conference
- State Duma of the Russian Empire of the Fourth Convocation
- Revolutionary activity of Vladimir Lenin
- Soviet democracy

== Related conflicts ==
- Russian Civil War
- Establishment of Soviet power in Russia (1917–1918)

== Events ==
=== Revolution of 1905 ===
- Russian Revolution of 1905

==== Russo-Japanese War ====
- Russo-Japanese War

=== February Revolution ===
- February Revolution

==== World War I ====
- World War I
- Eastern Front (World War I)

=== Russian Republic ===
- Russian Republic

=== October Revolution ===
- October Revolution

=== Russian Civil War ===
- Russian Civil War

==== Polish-Soviet War ====
- Polish-Soviet War

=== Political events ===
- April Crisis
- July Days
- Kornilov affair
- Vikzhel negotiations
- Establishment of Soviet power in Russia (1917–1918)

==== Conferences and Congresses ====
- All-Russian Conference of the Soviets
- First All-Russian Congress of Soviets of Workers' and Soldiers' Deputies
- Second All-Russian Congress of Soviets of Workers' and Soldiers' Deputies
- Extraordinary All-Russia Congress Of Soviets Of Peasants' Deputies
- Third All-Russian Congress of Workers' and Soldiers' Deputies' Soviets
- Fifth All–Russian Congress of Soviets
- First All-Union Congress of Soviets
- First All Russian Congress of Trade Unions
- Third All-Russian Conference of Trade Unions
- 6th Congress of the Russian Social Democratic Labour Party (Bolsheviks)
- 7th Congress of the Russian Communist Party (Bolsheviks)
- Moscow State Conference
- All-Russian Democratic Conference
- First All-Ukrainian Congress of Soviets (Kharkiv)
- Second All-Ukrainian Congress of Soviets
- Third All-Ukrainian Congress of Soviets
- State Meeting in Ufa

==== Elections ====
- 1917 Russian municipal elections
- 1917 Kiev City Duma election
- 1917 Moscow District Duma elections
- 1917 Russian Constituent Assembly election
- 1917 Baku City Duma election
- 1917 Minsk City Duma election
- 1917 Odessa City Duma election
- 1917 Russian municipal elections
- 1917 Astrakhan City Duma election
- November 1917 Yekaterinburg City Duma election

=== Military events ===
- 1917 Kronstadt Mutiny
- Kornilov affair
- Bykhov Imprisonment
- Establishment of Soviet power in Russia (1917–1918)

=== Other events ===
- Jailbirds of Kerensky

== Terror ==
- Cheka – The first Soviet secret police, set up in December 1917 under Felix Dzerzhinsky. It was the main instrument of the Red Terror; its internal-defense troops numbered at least 200,000 by 1921.
- Lenin's hanging order (11 August 1918) – Lenin's telegram to Penza ordering that no fewer than 100 kulaks be hanged in public. It was not carried out as such, and the name comes from the US Library of Congress.
- Red Terror (September 1918 – 1922) – Bolshevik campaign of political repression and execution, carried out mainly by the Cheka. Estimates of executions run from 50,000 to 200,000, and a further 400,000 deaths are attributed to prisons and to the suppression of local revolts.
  - Outline of the Red Terror (Russia)

== Places ==
- Smolny Institute
- Dacha Durnovo

== People ==
=== Political leaders ===
- Revolutionary activity of Vladimir Lenin
- Nikolai Bukharin
- Viktor Nogin
- Vladimir Milyutin
- Georgy Oppokov
- Pēteris Stučka
- Grigory Petrovsky
- Jēkabs Peterss
- Józef Unszlicht
- Fyodor Sergeyev
- Vyacheslav Molotov
- Maxim Litvinov
- Andrei Bubnov
- Filipp Goloshchyokin
- Georgy Pyatakov
- Georgy Safarov
- Yemelyan Yaroslavsky
- Rosalia Zemlyachka
- Nikolai Sukhanov
- Fyodor Dan
- Abram Gots
- Aleksandra Izmailovich
- Apollon Karelin

=== Military leaders ===
- Nikolai Krylenko
- Pavel Dybenko
- Georgy Blagonravov
- Konstantin Mekhonoshin
- Dmitry Zhloba
- Nikolai Khovrin
- Semyon Zapadny
- Vladimir Smirnov
- Nikolay Tolmachyov
- Alexander Miasnikian
- Kliment Voroshilov
- Dmitry Ivanovich Popov

=== Other notable figures ===
- Maxim Gorky
- William N. Haskell
- Yekaterina Kuskova
- Fridtjof Nansen

== Post–Russian Empire states and groups ==
=== Successor states ===
- Russian Republic
- Russian Provisional Government

=== Soviet republics and autonomies ===
- Socialist Soviet Republic of Abkhazia
- Baku Commune
- Bessarabian Soviet Socialist Republic
- Black Sea Soviet Republic
- Bukharan People's Soviet Republic
- Socialist Soviet Republic of Byelorussia
- Crimean Socialist Soviet Republic
- Don Soviet Republic
- Donetsk–Krivoy Rog Soviet Republic
- Commune of the Working People of Estonia
- Far Eastern Republic
- Finnish Socialist Workers' Republic
- Galician Soviet Socialist Republic
- Georgian Soviet Socialist Republic
- Kara-Kirghiz Autonomous Oblast
- Karakalpak Autonomous Oblast
- Kazan Soviet Workers' and Peasants' Republic
- Khorezm People's Soviet Republic
- Kirghiz Autonomous Socialist Soviet Republic (1926–1936)
- Kuban Soviet Republic
- Kuban–Black Sea Soviet Republic
- Lithuanian Soviet Socialist Republic (1918–1919)
- Socialist Soviet Republic of Lithuania and Belorussia
- Mountain Autonomous Soviet Socialist Republic
- Mughan Soviet Republic
- North Caucasian Soviet Republic
- Odessa Soviet Republic
- Stavropol Soviet Republic
- Taurida Soviet Socialist Republic
- Terek Soviet Republic
- Transcaucasian Socialist Federative Soviet Republic
- Turkestan Autonomous Soviet Socialist Republic
- Tuvan People's Republic
- Ukrainian Soviet Republic
- Ukrainian Soviet Socialist Republic
- Volga German Autonomous Soviet Socialist Republic

=== Anti-Bolshevik and White governments ===
- Centrocaspian Dictatorship
- Crimean Regional Government
- Don Republic
- Government of South Russia
- Provisional All-Russian Government
- Provisional Military Dictatorship of Mughan
- Provisional Regional Government of the Urals
- Provisional Siberian Government (Omsk)
- Provisional Siberian Government (Vladivostok)
- Siberian Republic (1918)
- South Russia (1919–1920)
- Transcaspian Government
- West Siberian Commissariat
- Yakutia (1918)

=== National and independence states ===
- Alash Autonomy
- Republic of Aras
- Azerbaijan Democratic Republic
- Bashkiria (1917–1919)
- Belarusian People's Republic
- State of Buryat-Mongolia
- North Caucasian Emirate
- Crimean People's Republic
- First Republic of Armenia
- Democratic Republic of Georgia
- Idel-Ural State
- Karakorum Government
- Kuban People's Republic
- Moldavian Democratic Republic
- Mountainous Republic of the Northern Caucasus
- Second Polish Republic
- Provisional National Government of the Southwestern Caucasus
- Transcaucasian Democratic Federative Republic
- Turkestan Autonomy
- Ukrainian People's Republic

=== Central Powers client states ===
- Duchy of Courland and Semigallia (1918)
- Kingdom of Finland
- Kingdom of Lithuania (1918)
- Kingdom of Poland (1917–1918)
- Ukrainian State

=== Insurgencies ===
- Chyhyryn Soviet Republic
- Kholodny Yar Republic
- Makhnovshchina
- Republic of Mountainous Armenia
- Soviet Republic of Naissaar
- North Ingria
- Olonets Government of Southern Karelia
- Republic of Perloja
- Republic of Uhtua
- Republic of Wędziagoła

=== Movements ===
- Green Ukraine
- Pro-independence movements in the Russian Civil War
- Siberian regionalism
- Whites (Finland)

=== Councils and committees ===
- Iskolat
- Kuban Rada
- People's Secretariat
- Political Centre (Russia)
- Provisional Polish Revolutionary Committee
- Special Transcaucasian Committee
- Transcaucasian Commissariat
- Zemstvo of Maritime Territory

=== Miscellaneous ===
- Crimea in the Soviet Union
- Perloja
- Soviet Central Asia

== Organizations ==
=== Political parties ===
- Political parties of Russia in 1917
- Bolsheviks
- Mensheviks
- Mezhraiontsy
- Left Socialist-Revolutionaries
- Trudoviks
- Popular Socialists (Russia)
- Yedinstvo
- Russian Social Democratic Labour Party (of Internationalists)
- Union of Socialists-Revolutionaries-Maximalists
- Party of Revolutionary Communism
- General Jewish Labour Bund
- Communist Party of the Soviet Union
- Military Opposition
- Constitutional Democratic Party
- Union of October 17
- Progressive Bloc (Russia)
- All-Russian Union of Landowners and Farmers
- Union of the Russian People
- Ukrainian Socialist-Revolutionary Party
- Borotbists
- Communist Party of Ukraine (Soviet Union)
- Belarusian Socialist Assembly
- Communist Party of Byelorussia
- Social Democratic Party of Georgia
- Musavat
- Alash (party)
- Milliy Firqa
- Young Bukharans
- Young Khivans

=== Military units ===
- Red Guards
- Latvian Riflemen
- Red Cossacks
- Baltic Fleet during the October Revolution and Russian Civil War

=== Gorverning organizations ===
- Russian Provisional Government
- Russian Republic
- Congress of Soviets
- All-Russian Congress of Soviets
- All-Russian Central Executive Committee
- All-Ukrainian Congress of Soviets
- Military Revolutionary Committee
- Revolutionary committee (Soviet)
- Security Council of the Northern Caucasus and Dagestan
- Russian Government (1918–1919)
- Provisional Siberian Government (Omsk)
- Provisional Regional Government of the Urals
- Provisional Government of the Northern Region
- Regional Government of Northwest Russia
- Russian Eastern Okraina
- Provisional Priamurye Government
- Provisional Military Dictatorship of Mughan
- Kuban Rada
- Provisional All-Russian Government
- West Siberian Commissariat
- Provisional Siberian Government (Vladivostok)
- Karakorum Government
- Provisional Governing Commission

== Documents ==
- Declaration of the Rights of the Peoples of Russia
- Decree on the system of government of Russia
- Declaration of the Creation of the Union of Soviet Socialist Republics
- Sisson Documents

== Culture and society ==
=== Literature ===
==== Fiction ====
- And Quiet Flows the Don (1928–1940) – Sholokhov's four-volume novel of the Don Cossacks; its hero, Grigory Melekhov, changes sides repeatedly.
- Byzantium Endures (1981) – Moorcock's novel narrated by an unreliable Russian émigré who recalls the revolution and civil war.
- Coup de Grâce (1939) – Yourcenar's triangle drama, set among German forces fighting the Bolsheviks in Courland.
- Doctor Zhivago (1957) – Pasternak's novel of a physician-poet, first published in Italy after being refused publication at home.
- How the Steel Was Tempered (1932–1934) – Ostrovsky's socialist realist novel of a young Bolshevik fighter, a fictionalised autobiography.
- R.V.S. (1926) – Gaidar's short novel of two boys in a Ukrainian village who shelter a wounded Red Army officer.
- The Road to Calvary (1918–1941) – Aleksey Tolstoy's trilogy on the fate of the Russian intelligentsia before, during and after the revolution of 1917.
- The Samovar Girl (1921) – Frederick Ferdinand Moore's romance-adventure novel set at Chita in eastern Siberia, drawing on his service there as a US Army intelligence officer during the Allied intervention.
- The White Guard (1925) – Bulgakov's novel of the Turbin family in Kiev from late 1918, as rival armies fight over the city.
- The Winter Road
- Odessa Stories
- Red Cavalry
- The Winter Road (2015) – Yuzefovich's documentary novel about the Yakut revolt and its opposing commanders, Pepelyayev and Strod.
- The Twelve

==== Non-fiction ====
- 1905 (book)
- A People's Tragedy
- Belorussia under Soviet Rule, 1917–1957
- Leon Trotsky: A Revolutionary's Life
- Russia in Flames
- Russia in Revolution
- The House of Government
- The Russian Revolution: A New History
- Trotsky: A Biography

==== Memoirs and diaries ====
- Cursed Days (1936) – Bunin's diaries kept in Moscow and Odessa in 1918–1920; banned in the Soviet Union until the late 1980s.
- Siberia To-day
- Ten Days That Shook the World

==== Other works ====
- Adventures of a Postmodern Historian: Living and Writing the Past
- Sociology of Revolution

==== Propaganda ====
- History of the Russian Revolution
- New Course (Trotsky book)
- Lessons of October
- Terrorism and Communism
- The Dictatorship of the Proletariat (pamphlet)
- The Permanent Revolution and Results and Prospects
- The Revolution Betrayed
- The Mass Strike, the Political Party and the Trade Unions
- Their Morals and Ours: The class foundations of moral practice
- Towards Socialism or Capitalism?
- The Russian Revolution
- The ABC of Communism
- The Dictatorship of the Proletariat (pamphlet)
- The ABC of Communism
- Novoye Vremya (newspaper)
- Sisson Documents

=== Film ===
- The End of St. Petersburg
- October: Ten Days That Shook the World
- Tsar to Lenin
- Lenin in October
- The Great Dawn
- Doctor Zhivago
- Nicholas and Alexandra
- Reds
- The Romanovs: An Imperial Family
- Bolshevism on Trial

=== Other ===
- "The Internationale"
- "Worker's Marseillaise"
- Novoye Vremya (newspaper)
- The Storming of the Winter Palace
- Winter Palace Taken
- Symphony No. 2 (Shostakovich)
- Symphony No. 12 (Shostakovich)
- Monument to the Fighters of the Revolution
- You Fell Victim to a Fateful Struggle
- There is such a party!

=== Miscellaneous ===
- Jewish Bolshevism

== International reaction ==
- United States and the Russian Revolution
- Leeds Convention
- Hands Off Russia
- American Jewish anti-Bolshevism during the Russian Revolution
- Bolshevism on Trial
- Overman Committee
- Palmer raids
- First Red Scare
- Red Flag riots

== Aftermath ==
- Russian Civil War

== Miscellaneous ==
- Sovietization

== Bibliography ==
- Bibliography of the Russian Revolution and Civil War § October Revolution

The works below all cover the October Revolution and carry extensive bibliographies for further research.

- Smith, S. A. (2017). Russia in Revolution: An Empire in Crisis, 1890 to 1928. New York: Oxford University Press.
- Engelstein, L. (2017). Russia in Flames: War, Revolution, Civil War, 1914–1921. New York: Oxford University Press.
- Figes, O. (1996). A People's Tragedy: A History of the Russian Revolution. New York: Viking.
- McMeekin, S. (2017). The Russian Revolution: A New History. New York: Basic Books.
- Smele, J. (2016). The "Russian" Civil Wars, 1916–1926: Ten Years That Shook the World. New York: Oxford University Press. (Note: Contains an extensive 46 pp. bibliography of English and non-English works on the "Russian" Civil Wars.)

== See also ==
- Category:Russian Revolution
- Bibliography of the Russian Revolution and Civil War
- Outline of the Russian Revolution and Civil War
- Index of articles related to the Russian Revolution and Civil War
- Revolutions of 1917–1923
