= 1917 Russian municipal elections =

Elections to local City Dumas (municipal assemblies) were held across Russia in 1917. Following the February Revolution, the Russian Provisional Government began preparations for City Duma election, to precede the 1917 Russian Constituent Assembly election. On 16 April 1917 the new regulations for municipal elections were issued by the Provisional Government. The new regulations abolished the property and taxation requirements for voting. For the first time, suffrage was equal between men and women. Voting age was set at 20 years. Military servicemen were eligible to vote in local elections at sites of deployment.

== See also ==
- 1917 Astrakhan City Duma election
- 1917 Baku City Duma election
- November 1917 Yekaterinburg City Duma election
- 1917 Kiev City Duma election
- 1917 Minsk City Duma election
- 1917 Odessa City Duma election
- 1917 Moscow District Duma elections
- 1917 Smolensk City Duma election
- 1917 Vitebsk City Duma election
