= Aleksandr Trusov =

Russian Bolshevik revolutionary

- Born: 17 January 1888; Borisoglebsk (Russian Empire)
- Died: 12 April 1919 (aged 31)
- Resting place: Astrakhan
- Political party: Russian Social Democratic Labour Party

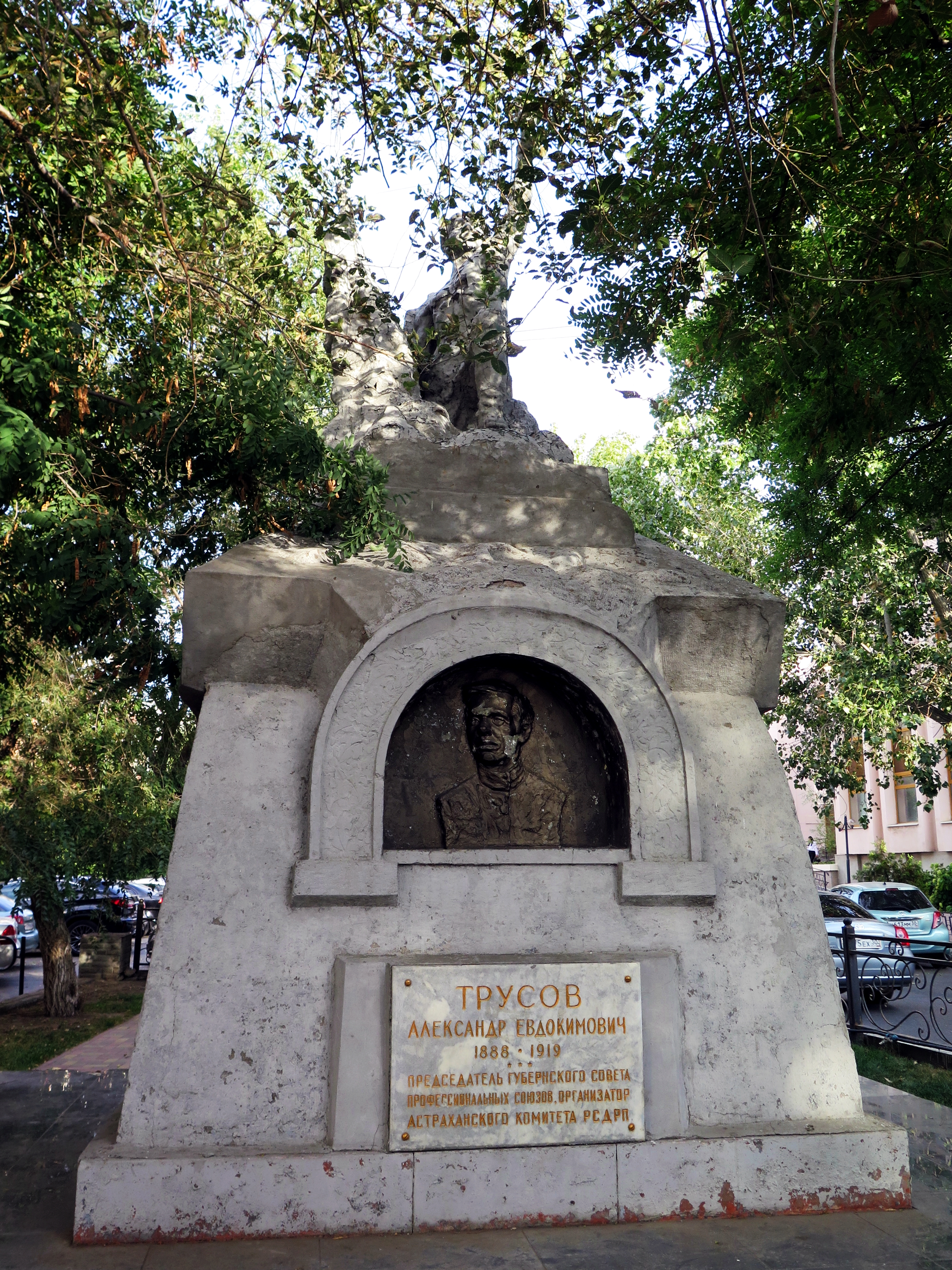
Trusov's tomb in downtown Astrakhan

Aleksandr Evdokimovich Trusov (Russian: Александр Евдокимович Трусов) was a Russian Bolshevik revolutionary. Originally from Borisoglebsk, Trusov was exiled to Astrakhan for political reasons. In Astrakhan he became a prominent figure in the Bolshevik movement, before dying of ill health a little over a year after the October Revolution.

== Early life and entry into revolutionary politics ==
Aleksandr Evdokimovich Trusov was born on 17 January 1888 in Borisoglebsk, Tambov Governorate. Trusov joined the Russian Social Democratic Labour Party in 1904. He was active in the Russian Revolution of 1905 in Borisoglebsk. Trusov began working as a teacher at age 20. In 1909 he was exiled to Astrakhan and placed under police surveillance.

== Exile and war ==
He continued revolutionary activities in Astrakhan. In June 1914 he was arrested and expelled from Astrakhan. In 1915 he arrived in Samara, where he became a member of the Samara Bolshevik Party Organization. He was drafted into the army, where he conducted revolutionary agitation among soldiers.

== 1917 revolutions ==
Returning from the Front back to Astrakhan in 1917, he rejoined the political movement there. On 14 August 1917 he was elected chairman of the Astrakhan Bolshevik Party Organization and became the editor of the newspaper Astrakhansky Rabochy ('Astrakhan Worker'). He was elected to the Russian Constituent Assembly from the Astrakhan constituency in late 1917.

== Factional conflict ==
After the establishment of Soviet power in Astrakhan, Trusov would become the chairman of the Astrakhan Provincial Council of Trade Unions and a member of the Astrakhan City Party Committee. However, he found himself at logger-heads with the Astrakhan Provincial Party Committee. In May 1918 the Astrakhan Provincial Party Committee reprimanded Trusov for placing trade union interests ahead of party interests. Trusov responded by setting up his own faction, the Group of Bolsheviks-Communists, independent from the City and Provincial Party Committees. The Trusov-led faction, addressing the Party Central Committee charged that the party organization in Astrakjan had been overtaken by violently intolerant newcomers with a limited understanding of communism. Trusov managed to gather a significant support in the Bolshevik ranks in Astrakhan. The Astrakhan factional conflict was brought to the attention of the central party leadership, but faced with a myriad of contradictory accusations from both groups the party chairman Yakov Sverdlov refused to take sides. On January 11, 1919 the Central Committee delegated Viktor Radus-Zenkovich to deal with the split in Astrakhan. In his speech to the Second All-Russian Congress of Trade Unions held January 16-25, 1919 Sverdlov expressed concern over the split between trade unions and party in Astrakhan and criticized neglect towards trade unions by the party organizations.

== Death ==
In April 1919 Trusov was recalled to Moscow, but fell ill and died en route in the night of 12-13 April 1919.

== Memorials ==
Esplanade Street in central Astrakhan was re-named after him in 1920 (the street returned to its pre-1920 name in 2007). Trusov's tomb was placed on the Trusov Street. Likewise the Trusovsky District on right bank of the Volga river in Astrakhan city, is named after him.
