= 1917 Kiev City Duma election =

Local election in Ukraine

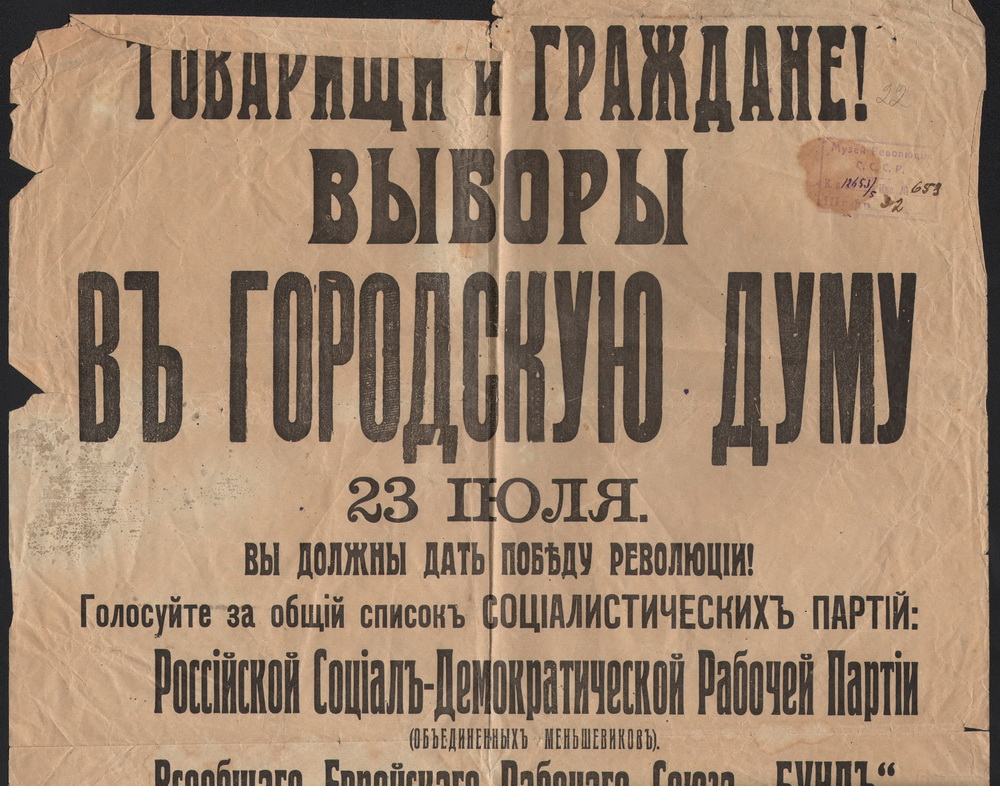
Fragment of electoral poster of the Russian-Jewish Socialist Bloc (List 1)

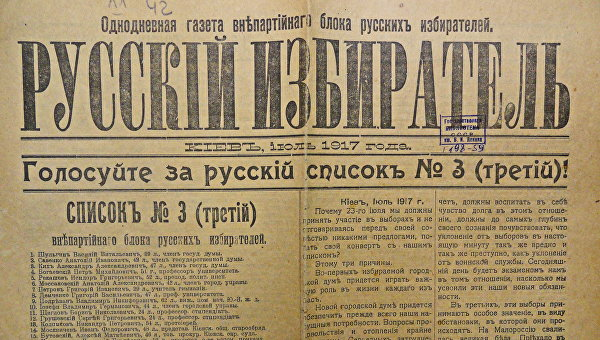
Electoral propaganda bulletin of the Bloc of Russian Voters (List 3). Vasily Shulgin appears as the top candidate of List 3

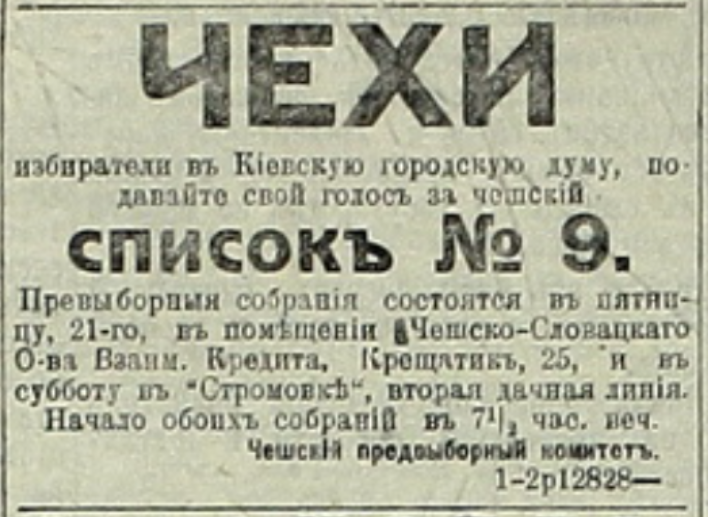
Advert for the Czech list

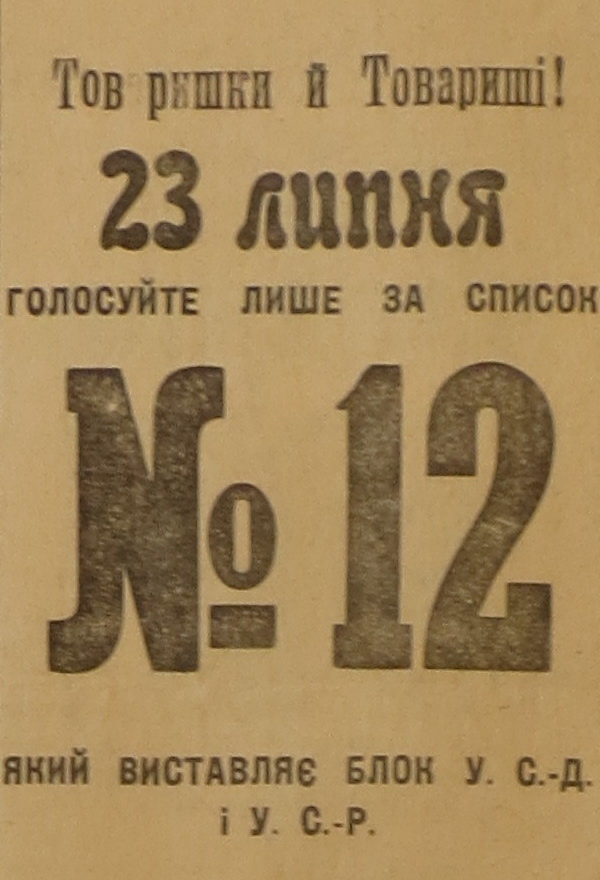
Electoral propaganda of the Ukrainian Socialist Bloc (List 12)

An election to the Kiev City Duma was held on 5 August [O.S. 23 July] 1917. The election took place in the aftermath of the February Revolution (with Russia was governed by the Provisional Government), the formation of the Ukrainian Central Rada and the First World War. The election resulted in a victory for the socialist bloc.

== Candidate lists ==
Eighteen lists of candidates contested the election. A joint socialist list was formed by the Russian Socialist-Revolutionary Party, the Russian Social Democratic Labour Party (United Mensheviks), General Jewish Labour Bund and the Polish Socialist Party – Left (PPS-Lewica).

Ahead of the election the Ukrainian socialist parties had decided to launch a list of their own, in protest of what they saw as the 'anti-Ukrainian campaign' in the Russian socialist press. On the other extreme stood the Bloc of Russian Voters, one of the Russian nationalist groups that had emerged in response to the formation of the Central Rada in March 1917. Their main electoral slogan was 'Down with Ukraine and Ukrainization'.

The United Jewish Socialist Workers Party (Fareynikte) and the Jewish Social Democratic Labour Party (Poalei Zion) had a joint list. On the non-socialist side of Jewish politics there was the list of the Jewish Democratic Bloc - a coalition of Zionists, the Orthodox Agudath Yisrael and the non-affiliated Council of United Jewish Organizations.

The Polish Executive Committee, dominated by the National Democrats and claiming to be the representative of all Poles, fielded a 'Polish Voters' List'. The Polish Socialist Party – Revolutionary Faction ran a list of their own.

== Election result ==
There were 307,920 eligible voters, out of whom 178,704 (58%) cast their votes. There were 3,170 invalid votes. Below are two accounts of the election result; an article in the Russian conservative nationalist newspaper Kievlyanin, published 9 August [O.S. 27 July] 1917, and the work 1917 god na Kiyevshchine: khronika sobytiy ('1917 in the Kiev region: a chronicle of events'), published in 1928 by the Institute of Party History of the Communist Party (Bolsheviks) of Ukraine. The two sources give identical distribution of seats of elected deputies.

List	Results per Kievlyanin (1917)		Results per 1917 god na Kiyevshchine (1928)		Seats
List	Votes	% of votes	Votes	% of votes	Seats
List 1 - Bloc of Mensheviks, Socialist-Revolutionaries, Bund and PPS-Left	64,207	36.58%	63,586	37%	44
List 12 - Bloc of Ukrainian Social Democratic Labour Party and Ukrainian Socialist-Revolutionaries	35,603	20.28%	35,238	20%	24
List 3 - Bloc of Russian Voters	25,418	14.48%	23,032	15%	18
List 4 - People's Freedom Party ('Kadets')	15,170	8.64%	15,078	9%	10
List 10 - Bolsheviks	9,365	5.34%	9,520	6%	7
List 5 - Polish Voters' List	8,471	4.83%	8,893	5%	6
List 8 - Jewish Democratic Bloc	7,076	4.03%	6,741	4%	5
List 2 - Jewish Socialist Bloc (United Jewish Socialist Workers Party, Jewish Social Democratic Labour Party (Poalei Zion))	4,584	2.61%	4,223	2%	3
List 14 - Kiev Section of Polish Socialists	1,709	0.97%	1,622	-	1
List 15 - Ukrainian Socialists-Federalists and non-party socialists	1,168	0.67%	1,060	-	1
List 17 - Union of Land Leaseholders	606	0.35%	552	-	1
List 7 - Labour People's Socialist Party	424	0.24%	-	-	0
List 18 - Women Reservists	419	0.24%	-	-	0
List 16 - Kiev Union of Military Invalids	403	0.23%	-	-	0
List 9 - Czech People's Party	346	0.20%	-	-	0
List 11 - Group of Clerks and Deputies of Kiev City Local Government	326	0.19%	-	-	0
List 6 - List for Starokievsky District, Batyeva Gora and Novovokzalna Street	172	0.10%	-	-	0
List 13 - Progressive Democratic Group of inhabitants of Pechersk, Zvirynets and Staronavodnytska Street	67	0.04%	-	-	0

The monarchist list 3 was mainly vote was in the central parts of the city. The socialists obtained better voting numbers in the outskirts and suburbs of the city. The Bolshevik vote was primarily based among workers of Arsenal Factory and Podol and soldiers at the 3rd Air Field. The Bolsheviks got 2,259 votes in Pechersk and 1,536 votes in Lybidsk. In the Shuliavka District the Ukrainian socialist list got 1,104 votes, whilst the Bolsheviks got 10 votes, the monarchists 1 vote and the Russian-Jewish socialist list 1 vote.

Ukrainian parties won a fifth of the seats in the City Duma. 10 out of the 24 deputies for the Ukrainian socialist list were Ukrainian Socialist-Revolutionaries. The General Jewish Labour Bund got 7 of the 44 seats won by of the Menshevik-SR-Bund list, Moisei Rafes being one of the Bundist deputies. Mikhail Balabanov was one of the Menshevik deputies. Georgy Pyatakov was one of the Bolshevik deputies. Ipolit Fialek, leader of the Polish section of the Kiev City Bolshevik Committee, was one of the elected deputies. Kazimierz Domosławski was the deputy of the Polish Socialist Party in the city duma.

== New city government ==
After the election, Vikenty Dreling (a respected journalist and Menshevik) was elected chairman of the City Duma. A secret ballot was held in the City Duma to elect the new mayor - the Socialist-Revolutionary from Moscow Yevgeny Ryabtsov was an elected with a majority of votes (48 votes) whilst Mykola Porsh of the Ukrainian Bloc obtained 24 votes. The Menshevik Abram Ginzburg ('Naumov') became the deputy mayor. Out of the ten members of the city executive, there were only three Ukrainians (Stepan Siropolko, Dmytro Koliukh, Levko Kovalev). The city government, representing the moderate socialist trend, would face pressure from both Bolshevism and Ukrainian nationalism in the ensuing period.

Gordon M. Hahn (2018) argues that the weak showing of Ukrainian parties in urban elections in the summer of 1917 may have contributed to the Russian Provisional Government's August 1917 decision to reject the draft Ukrainian constitution presented by the Central Rada. By the time of the 1917 Russian Constituent Assembly election, the Ukrainian Bloc vote in Kiev city increased to 26%.

== See also ==
- 1917 Astrakhan City Duma election
- 1917 Baku City Duma election
- November 1917 Yekaterinburg City Duma election
- 1917 Russian municipal elections
- 1917 Minsk City Duma election
- 1917 Odessa City Duma election
