= Vikenty Dreling =

Russian journalist (1873–1920)

Vikenty Andreevich Dreling (Russian: Викентий Андреевич Дрелинг) was a Russian journalist and politician.

Dreling was born in 1873, and hailed from a Polish noble family. He was a son of a machinist. He studied at the Chernigov Gymnasium, and in 1894 became a student of Moscow University. Dreling was part of the League of Struggle for the Emancipation of the Working Class group in Kiev. He left Russia in 1895.

Having returned to Russia, as of 1917 he was the chairman of the Kiev City Committee of the Russian Social Democratic Labour Party (Mensheviks). On the national question, Dreling opposed federalism and argued that the demands of the Ukrainian nationalist movement would lead to the fragmentation of the state and prove detrimental to the class struggle unity and productive forces. He headed the socialist list in the 1917 Kiev City Duma election. After the election, he was elected chairman of the Kiev City Duma. He worked as an editor of the newspaper Kievskaya Mysl'.

Dreling was among the Kiev Menshevik leaders accused at the revolutionary tribunal March 21–23, 1920, for his past role in the city government. Dreling died in 1920 of cholera.
