= 1917 Astrakhan City Duma election =

Local election in Russia

An election to the Astrakhan City Duma (municipal council) was held in June 1917, in the period between the February Revolution and the October Revolution. There were some 80,000 eligible voters, out of whom about half (approximately 41,500) participated.

The election was won by the socialist list, which obtained 68% of the cast votes and a total of 72 seats. The list was dominated by the Party of Socialist Revolutionaries (SR), but also included candidates from the Social Democrats (S-D) and the Astrakhan Soviet of Workers and Soldiers Deputies. As workers and artisans only made up about 20% of the adult population of the city, the socialist list would have been supported by non-working class sectors. Also, workers with non-Russian ethnic groups would have votes for their respective national lists rather than the Russian socialist list. The top candidates of the socialist list were Oleg Mikhailov (SR), Dionisiy Chernobaev (SR) and Fedor Kruglikov (S-D/Menshevik). Other notable candidates on the socialist list included Konstantin Bakradze (SR, no. 7), Shabalina (SR, no. 8), Sarabyanov (S-D, no. 9), Abdusheli (S-D), Rafes (S-D, no 18), Aleksandr Trusov (S-D/Bolshevik), Astvatsaturova (S-D, no 30), Tereshchenko (S-D, no. 32), Higer (S-D/Bolshevik, no. 60), Nepryakhina (S-D, no. 61) and Parfyonova-Perfilieva (SR, no. 94). After the election the Menshevik Kruglikov became the chairman of the City Duma.

The Muslim list (list number 5) obtained 14% of the vote and 15 seats. The Muslim list included some leftist elements. Two women were elected as members of the City Duma from the Muslim list - G. G. Nasybullina and S.D.M. Karimova.

The Kadets suffered a crushing defeat in the election, being relegated to third place with 13% of the vote and 14 mandates. The remainder of the seats were divided between smaller parties. The Trudovik list won two seats. General and socialist-oriented Jewish lists won two seats each. A non-partisan list obtained two seats. The Cossack list obtained just 206 votes but managed to win a single seat in the City Duma.

== See also ==
- 1917 Russian municipal elections
- 1917 Baku City Duma election
- November 1917 Yekaterinburg City Duma election
- 1917 Kiev City Duma election
- 1917 Minsk City Duma election
- 1917 Odessa City Duma election
