= All-Russian Union of Landowners and Farmers =

The All-Russian Union of Landowners and Farmers (Russian: Всероссийский союз земельных собственников и землевладельцев) was a right-wing party in Russia. At the time of the Russian Revolution of 1917, the Union of Landowners mobilized resistance to soviets and sought to defend private ownership of estates.

The party began taking shape in 1916, as different landowners' groups across the country began to seek building a new national organization. A constituent national congress of the party was held in Moscow on May 20, 1917, with over 300 delegates (both nobles and peasants) from 31 provinces. Using the term 'constituent', the organization sought to distance itself from its 1905 predecessor. A new council of the Union of Landowners, with N. N. L'vov as its chairman, was established.

The party contested the 1917 Russian Constituent Assembly election. Per the account of Lenin, which includes votes from 54 constituencies, the party obtained some 215,000 votes.
