= Perloja =

- Village
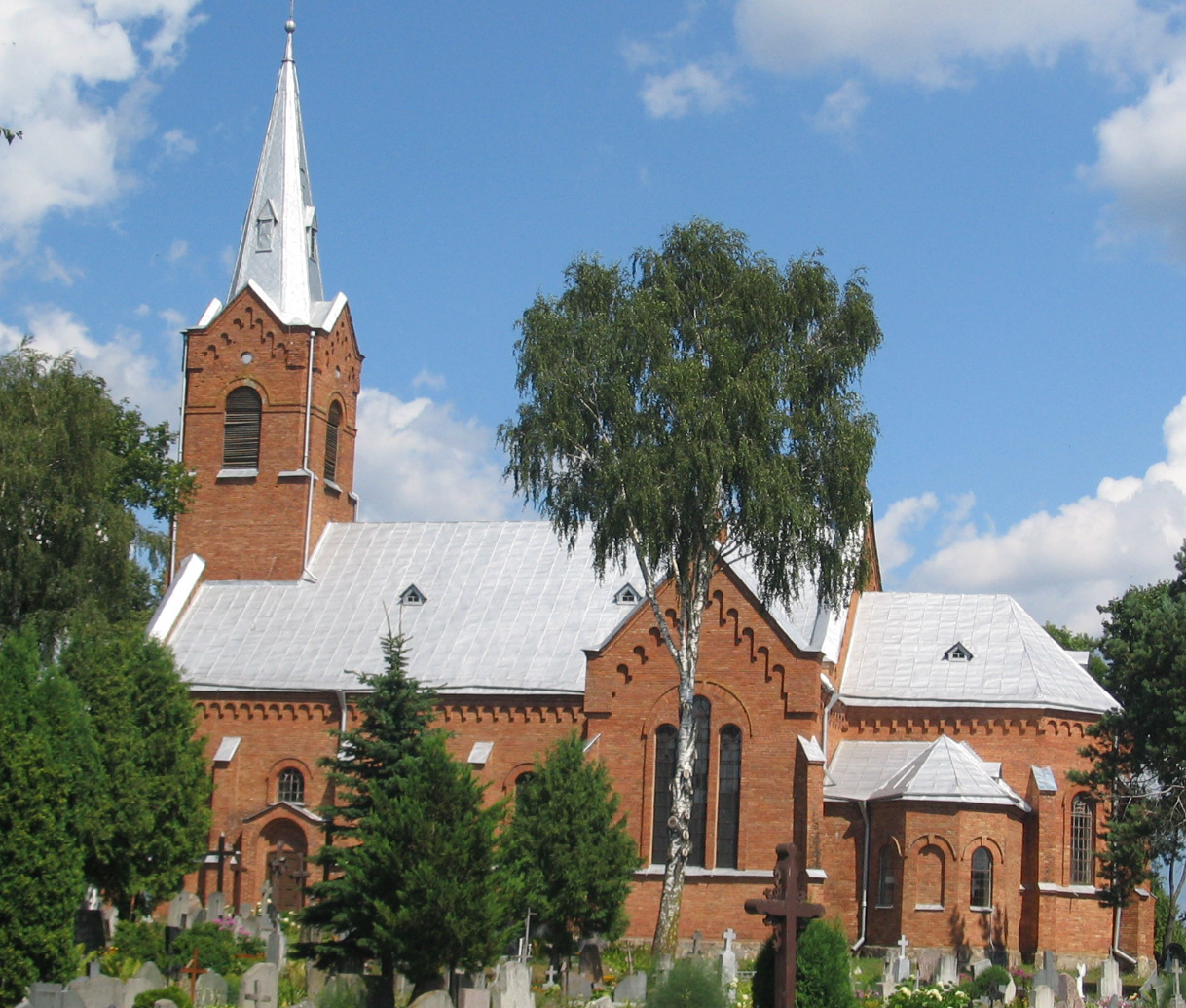
- Perloja's church

- Coat of arms

- Location of Perloja Perloja (Lithuania)
- Coordinates: 54°12′52″N 24°24′52″E
- Country: Lithuania
- Ethnographic region: Dzūkija
- County: Alytus County
- Municipality: Varėna district municipality
- Eldership: Varėna eldership
- First mentioned: 1378
- Granted Magdeburg rights: 1792

Population (2021)
  - Total: 484
- Time zone: UTC+2 (EET)
  - Summer (DST): UTC+3 (EEST)

Perloja (Polish: Przełaje, Belarusian: Пералая, romanized: Pieralaja) is a village in Varėna district, Lithuania. It is situated 19 km (12 mi) to the west from Varėna on the banks of Merkys River and on the Vilnius–Druskininkai road. According to the 2001 census, it had 774 inhabitants. The village is known for the so-called Republic of Perloja, an independent, albeit unrecognised microstate that was established in the aftermath of World War I and existed until 1923.

== Village ==
The village is surrounded by the Dainava Forest. Perloja is situated on both banks of the Merkys River, with the larger settlement on the right bank. In the forest close to Perloja there is the small but very deep lake Paperlojis. A monument of Vytautas the Great was built in 1930 and was one of the few preserved during the times of the Soviet Lithuania. In the centre of Perloja stands a church built in Neo-Gothic style (built in 1928–1930) and a monument to the Lithuanian partisans, who fought against the Soviet occupation (built in 1995).

== History ==
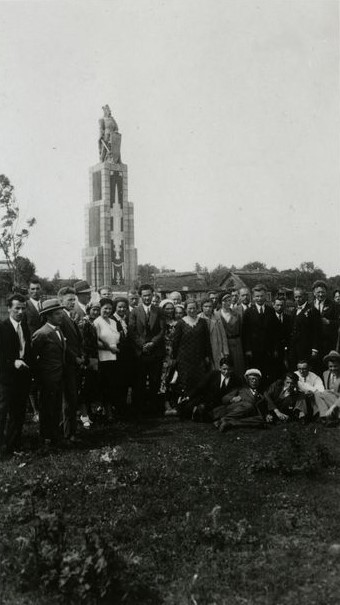
Perloja's Vytautas the Great Monument in 1930s

While archaeological research dates human presence in the area to the Neolithic era, Perloja village was first mentioned in writing in 1378. Situated on the important Vilnius–Hrodna road, the village had a royal estate for accommodation of traveling Grand Dukes and other Lithuanian nobles. After Christianization of Lithuania, the village was one of the first places to construct a Catholic church funded by Vytautas the Great. In 1710, during the Great Northern War, the plague wiped out almost all inhabitants of Perloja. However the settlement recovered and was granted the Magdeburg rights and coat of arms in 1792. The arms depicted a bull with Latin cross on its head. Possibly the image was borrowed from Kaunas. The arms and the rights were soon abolished as the village was absorbed into the Russian Empire following the partitions of the Polish–Lithuanian Commonwealth. The historic coat of arms was restored in 1993.

=== Republic of Perloja ===
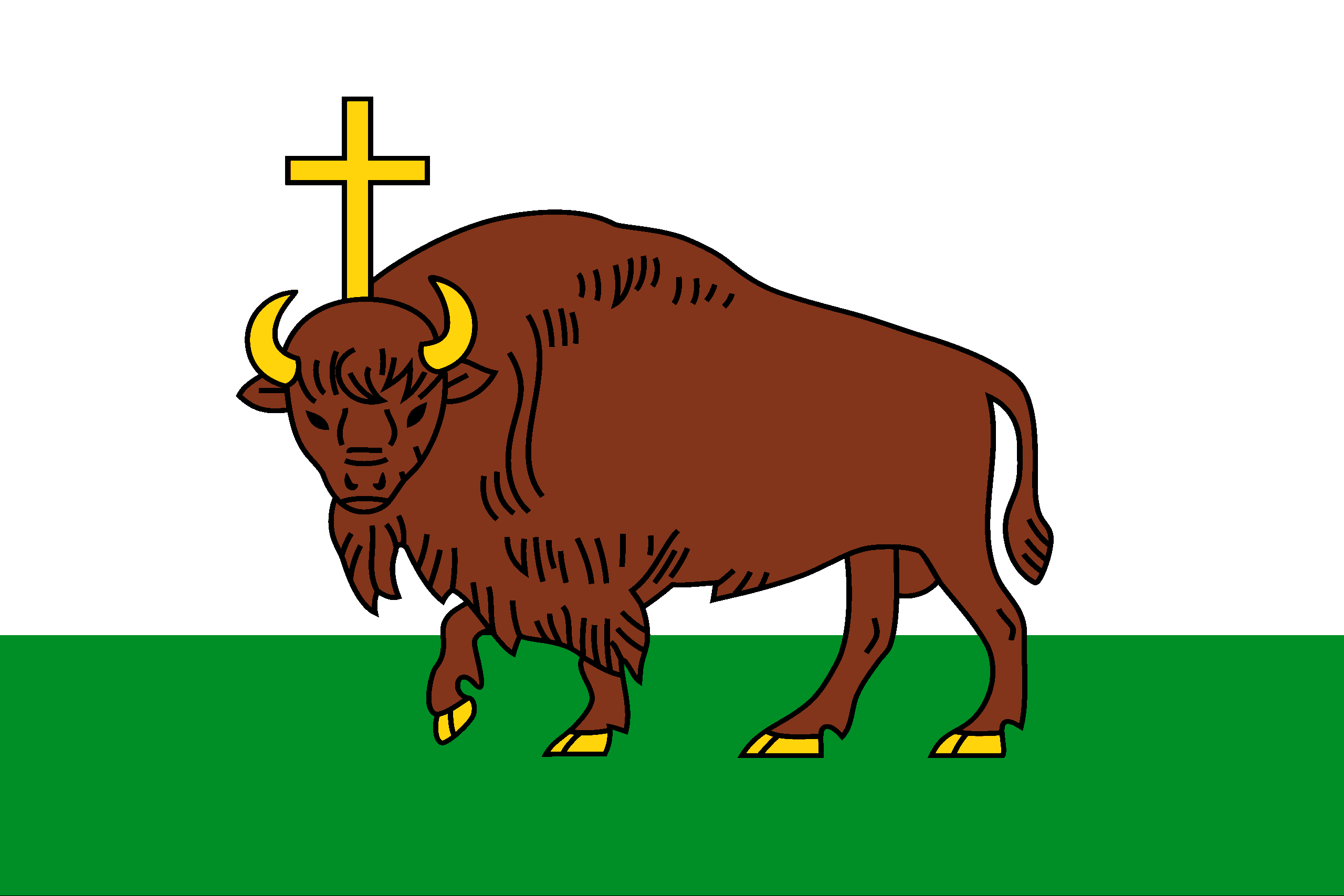
Flag used by the Republic of Perloja.

In the chaos after World War I, Lithuania scrambled to establish functioning state structures and defend itself in the Lithuanian Wars of Independence against German, Soviet and Polish soldiers. In November 1918, responding to such situation the locals established a self-governing parish committee, often called the Republic of Perloja (Perlojos respublika), chaired by Jonas Česnulevičius, veteran of the Imperial Russian Army. The Republic of Perloja had its own court, police, prison, currency (Perloja litas), and an army of 300 men. This army engaged in fights with various military units. The self-government was preserved even during the Lithuanian–Soviet War in 1919; the Parish Committee was simply renamed to a revolutionary committee. After the Polish–Lithuanian War for Vilnius Region, Perloja was in the neutral zone established by the League of Nations. In 1923, the zone was divided along the Merkys River, leaving one bank to Lithuania and another to the Second Polish Republic. The Republic of Perloja existed with interruptions until 1923.
