= Kiev electoral district =

Constituency of the Russian Republic

Kiev
- Former Civilian constituency for the All-Russian Constituent Assembly
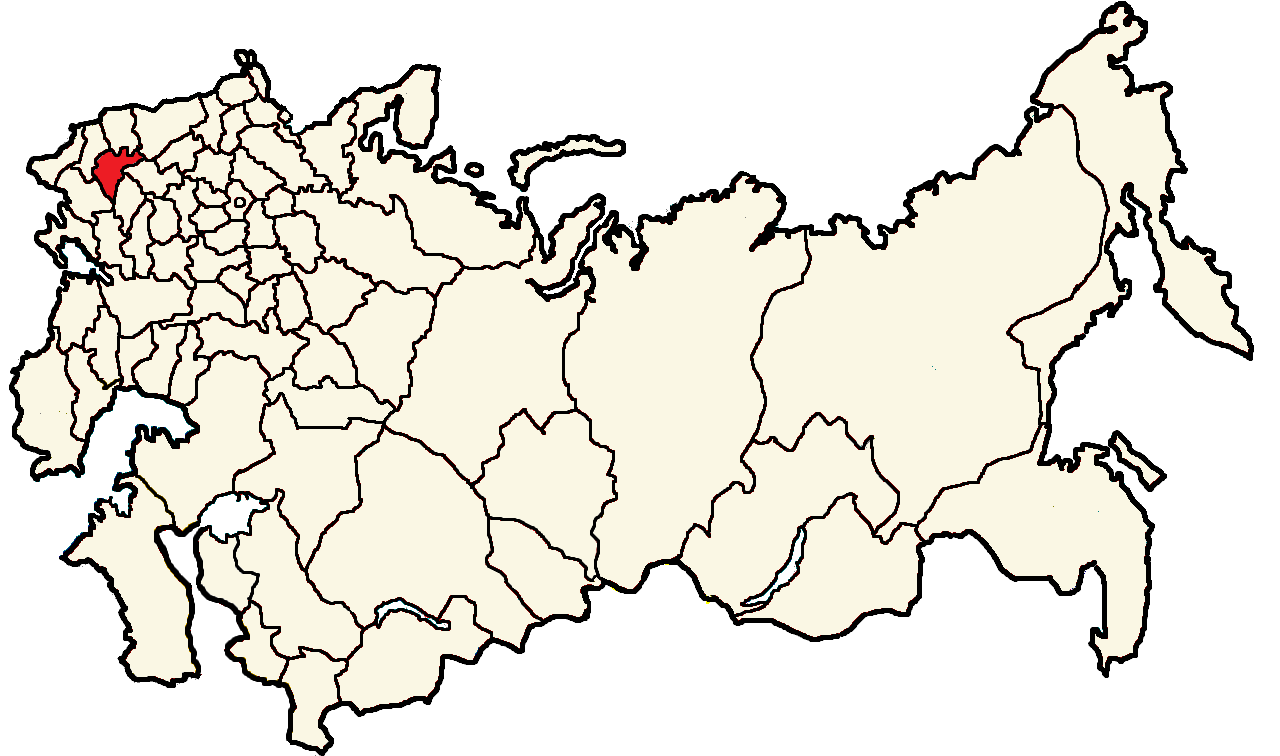

Former constituency
- Created: 1917
- Abolished: 1918
- Number of members: 22
- Number of Uyezd Electoral Commissions: 12
- Number of Urban Electoral Commissions: 3
- Number of Parishes: 211

The Kiev electoral district (Russian: Киевский избирательный округ) was a constituency created for the 1917 Russian Constituent Assembly election. The electoral district covered the Kiev Governorate.

The city of Kiev was a historical Black Hundred stronghold, and monarchists got some 3% of the votes in the district as a whole (a significant vote compared to the rest of the country). In the city itself the Ukrainian Socialist Bloc got 45,315 votes (25.6%), with the monarchist right-wing list getting 36,268 votes (20.5%), Bolsheviks 29,650 (16.8%), Kadets 18,165 votes (10.3%), the Jewish National Bloc 15,080 votes (8.5%), Polish 10,765 votes (6.1%), SRs 7,415 votes (4.2%), Mensheviks 6,530 votes (3.7%), Bund 1,975 votes (1.1%), Ukrainian Socialists-Federalists and Popular Socialists 1,860 votes (1%), Jewish Socialists 1,474 votes (0.8%), Poalei-Zion 966 votes (0.6%), Unity 707 votes (0.4%), Commercial-Industrial 394 votes (0.2%), Villagers' Group 170 votes (0.1%), Military Revolutionary Union 117 votes (0.1%) and 32 votes for List no. 15. In the Kiev garrison the monarchists did not amass any major share of votes, instead the Ukrainian Socialists obtained 46.1% and Bolsheviks 37%.

== Results ==
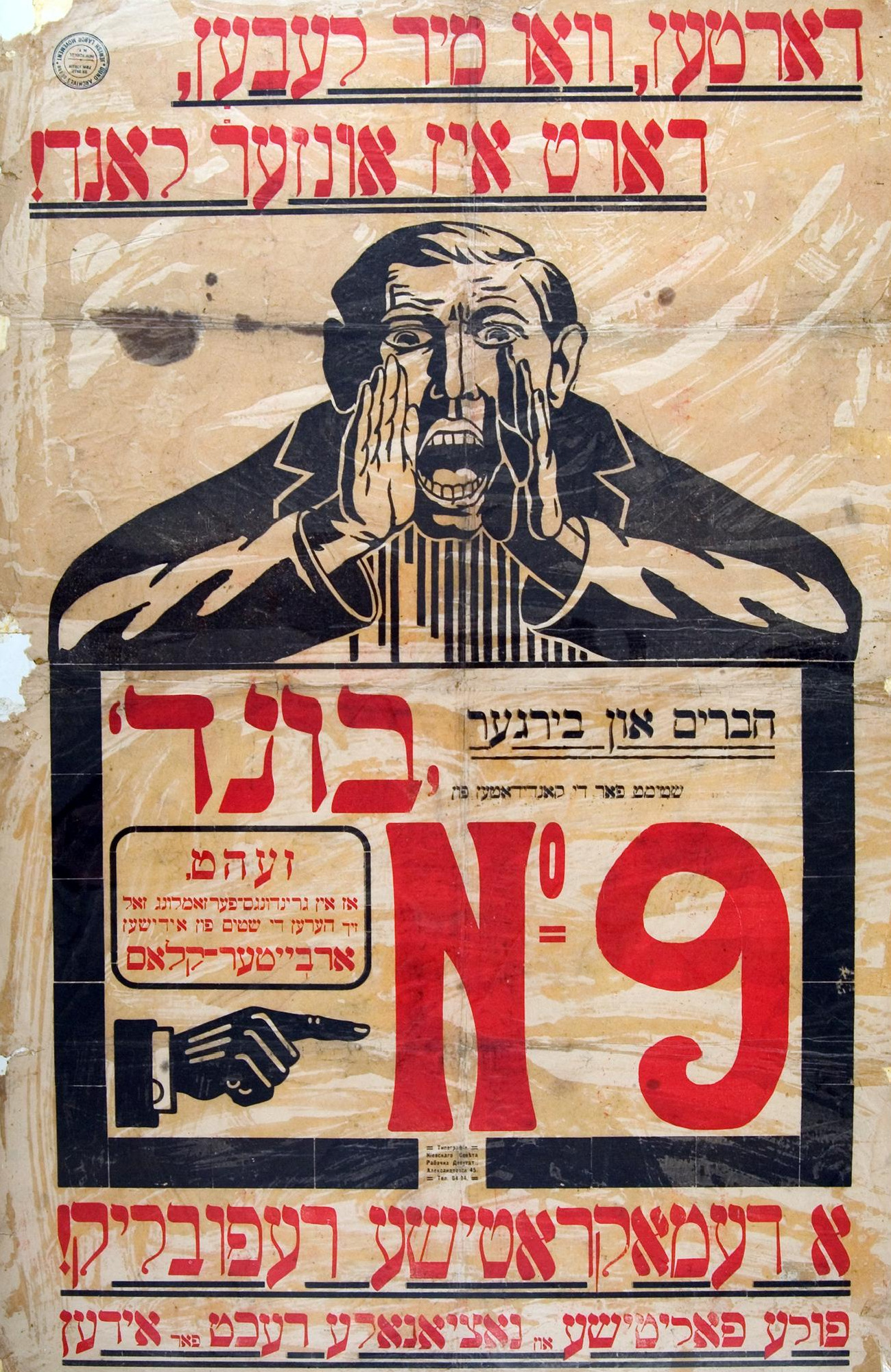
An election poster of the General Jewish Labour Bund hung in Kiev. Heading: "Where we live, there is our country!" Inside frame: "Vote List 9, Bund". Bottom: "A democratic republic! Full national and political rights for Jews!"

Kiev
Party	Vote	%
List 1 - Ukrainian Socialist Bloc	1,161,033	77.26
List 2 - Jewish National Bloc	90,829	6.04
List 12 - Bolsheviks	60,693	4.04
List 8 - Russian Rightists	48,758	3.24
List 11 - Polish	42,943	2.86
List 6 - Kadets	21,667	1.44
List 9 - Bund	20,144	1.34
List 14 - Socialist-Revolutionaries	19,220	1.28
List 3 - Jewish Socialists	14,115	0.94
List 5 - Mensheviks	11,613	0.77
List 4 - Poalei Zion	4,086	0.27
List 13 - Ukrainian Socialists-Federalists and Popular Socialists	3,072	0.20
List 16 - Commercial-Industrial	2,508	0.17
List 17 - Unity	928	0.06
List 10 - Villagers' Group	655	0.04
List 7 - Military Revolutionary Union	258	0.02
List 15 - Zaustsinsky	203	0.01
Total:	1,502,725	

Deputies Elected
Chechel	Ukrainian Bloc
Darchuk	Ukrainian Bloc
Donchenko	Ukrainian Bloc
Dragomiretsky	Ukrainian Bloc
Hrushevsky	Ukrainian Bloc
Ilchenko	Ukrainian Bloc
Khimerik	Ukrainian Bloc
Khomutovsky	Ukrainian Bloc
Kotik	Ukrainian Bloc
Mandryka	Ukrainian Bloc
Porsh	Ukrainian Bloc
Prisyazhnyuk	Ukrainian Bloc
Pyrkovka	Ukrainian Bloc
Rohmanyuk	Ukrainian Bloc
Sevryuk	Ukrainian Bloc
Shvets	Ukrainian Bloc
Stasyuk	Ukrainian Bloc
Tkachenko	Ukrainian Bloc
Vynnychenko	Ukrainian Bloc
Fyalek	Bolshevik
Syrkin	Jewish National Bloc
