= November 1917 Yekaterinburg City Duma election =

Local election in Russia

An election to the city duma (municipal assembly) of Ekaterinburg was held on November 5, 1917. The election was part of the series of municipal elections across Russia following the February Revolution. A Ekaterinburg city duma election had been held on July 30, 1917, but in November a second election was held.

The Bolsheviks emerged as the largest party in the new city duma, with 40 out of 85 seats. The share of Bolshevik votes had increased from 21% in the July election to 46%. Pyotr Voykov, Pavel Bikov and Ivan Malishev and were among the newly elected Bolshevik deputies. On November 14, the new city duma elected veteran Bolshevik leader Sergei Chutskaev as the new mayor. Voikov was elected city duma chairman. Chutskaev and others among the newly elected Bolsheviks requested the assistance of the outgoing administration to help with the transition.

The Socialist-Revolutionaries formed the second largest contingent in the new city duma, with 20 deputies. As part of their election campaign, the SRs held a concert at the Verkh-Iset Theater in early November. The election result illustrated the declining influence of the SRs in the city. The Kadets, who were led by Lev Krol, emerged as the third largest faction in the new city duma.

The result was humiliating for the Mensheviks, after the election the membership of the Menshevik party decreased rapidly in the city.

== Result ==
Below an account from Kononenko (2003), with a total of 81 seats. However, other references outline that the city duma had 85 seats - among them 40 held by Bolsheviks, 20 SRs and 15 Kadets.

List	Votes	%	Seats
Bolsheviks	9,194		39
Socialist-Revolutionaries	4,479		19
People's Freedom Party (Kadets)	3,438		15
Home-Owners' List	589		3
Mensheviks	349		2
Muslim List	321		1
Trudoviks	243		1
General Jewish Labour Bund	263		1
Total	19,850		

== See also ==
- 1917 Astrakhan City Duma election
- 1917 Baku City Duma election
- 1917 Russian municipal elections
- 1917 Kiev City Duma election
- 1917 Minsk City Duma election
- 1917 Odessa City Duma election
