= 1917 Vitebsk City Duma election =

Elections to a City Duma were held in the Russian city of Vitebsk on 9 September [O.S. August 27] 1917, with a large number of lists contesting. Voting coincided with the early stages of the Kornilov rebellion. Socialist parties won a majority of the seats.

== Candidate lists and election campaigning ==
In the wake of the February Revolution, local elections took part in various cities across Russia in the summer of 1917. The law of municipal self-government of the Provisional Government implemented in Vitebsk only by late August 1917. The city was engulfed in electoral campaigning. All in all, no less than twenty different lists would take place in the election. The Vitebsk Soviet of Workers and Soldiers Deputies was dominated by a bloc of Socialist-Revolutionaries and Mensheviks. To contest the City Duma election four parties formed a Socialist Bloc - the General Jewish Labour Bund, the Socialist-Revolutionaries, the Mensheviks and the Popular Socialists. The three latter Russian parties had all accepted the Bund position on Jewish cultural autonomy. At the time the Bund was facing criticism over its campaign to oppose the Sabbath as the weekly resting day. The Bund organization in Vitebsk was divided into defencists and internationalists. The United Jewish Socialist Workers Party (Fareynikhte) wished to join the Socialist Bloc, but their entry was blocked by the Bund and they would go on to run with a list of their own. The Jewish Social Democratic Labour Party (Poalei Zion) also fielded a list of their own.

Boris Pinson was the leader of the Bolshevik Party in Vitebsk. On June 20, 1917 a meeting was held in Vitebsk, attended by 59 Bolsheviks, 28 Mezhraiontsy and 11 Menshevik-Internationalists. The meeting resolved, in line with the April Theses of V. I. Lenin and the decisions of the 7th (April) Bolshevik Party Conference, to withdraw from the United Social Democratic organization and proceed to build an independent party organization in the city. On July 2, 1917 an organizational meeting of these three groups founded the Vitebsk Organization of Internationalists. The meeting elected a 9-member committee to lead the organization, consisting of Aleksandr Shifres, Boris Pinson, V. Ya. Chunchin, V. Petrov, S. I. Borodavsky, Ya. Ya. Abolin, D. M. Taimanov, Dolgashev, and I. I. Beresten. On July 4, 1917, a joint meeting of the Vitebsk Organization of Internationalists and the Committee of the Vitebsk organization of the Latvian Social Democracy. The July 4, 1917 named the committee of the Vitensk Organization of Internationalists as the leading body for all social democratic organizations in the city, albeit allowing each group to maintain their autonomy in their internal affairs. The July 4, 1917 meeting elected a presidium for the committee. The Bolsheviks and Latvian Social Democrats fielded a candidate list for the City Duma , List 6, with 21 candidates, predominantly workers and soldiers. Workers from military repair shops, the 4th Aviation Park, military bakeries, and other facilities nominated individuals to stand as candidates on List 6. Being barred from holding campaign events in meeting halls, the internationalists held a mass electoral rally in the city park attended by thousands of people. List 6 drew support mainly from the Latvian population in Vitebsk and from the military garrison.

Various lists sought to represent different national groups - Poles, Lithuanians, Jews and Latvians. In opposition to the socialist parties, the Zionists and Orthodox Jews agreed to form a 'non-party' Jewish coalition called Akhdus Yisroel ('Jewish Unity'). On June 20, 1917 a 200-member committee to lead Akhdus Yisroel was elected. During the electoral campaign Zionists and Orthodox Jews demanded that Jewish institutions in the city be placed under the control of Akhdus Yisroel. The Orthodox Jews had significant influence within Akhdus Yisroel, but there were persistent tensions between the Zionists and Orthodox Jews inside the coalition. On August 17, 1917 the Orthodox Jews broke away from Akhdus Yisroel and fielded their own list, Knesset Yisroel. The Knesset Yisroel list was headed by local industrial Lev Markovich. The Zionists, that remained in Akhdus Yisroel, were led by Yosef Elhanan Melamed All in all, six out of the twenty candidate lists were Jewish lists - List 8 (Fareynikhte), List 9 (Akhdus Yisroel), List 13 (Union of Merchants and Industrialists), List 15 (Jewish People's Party, mainly former socialists), List 16 (Poalei Zion) and List 19 (Knesset Yisroel).

Per Menshevik historian Grigory Aronson the list of the Union of Belorussians functioned as a refuge for former Black Hundred (far-right reactionaries). The Union of Belorussians list was headed by people from the old Czarist City Duma.

Voting took place on August 27, 1917. The election day coincided with the early stages of the Kornilov rebellion, and Vitebsk was geographically close to the epicentre of the uprising.

== Results ==
No.	List	Candidates	Votes	%	Seats
1	Socialist Bloc	102	9,612	36.49%	38
6	Bolsheviks and Latvian Social Democrats	21	4,212	15.99%	17
9	Akhdus Yisroel	21	2,054	7.80%	8
12	Kadets	55	2,041	7.75%	8
20	Union of Belorussians	55	1,836	6.97%	7
10	Polish Bloc	15	1,476	5.60%	6
8	United Jewish Socialist Workers Party	20	1,220	4.63%	5
5	Union of Homeowners	36	683	2.59%	2
13	Union of Merchants and Industrialists	15	620	2.35%	2
2	Old Believers	10	509	1.93%	2
11	Latvian Radical Democrats	8	362	1.37%	1
7	Polish workers, soldiers and the PPS	6	341	1.29%	1
19	Knesset Yisroel	9	302	1.15%	1
15	Jewish People's Party	10	299	1.14%	1
4	Lithuanian Popular Socialists	5	220	0.84%	1
16	Poalei Zion	10	186	0.71%	0
14	Union of Master Craftsmen	5	183	0.69%	0
18	City Duma Employees	13	108	0.41%	0
3	Townspeople	55	52	0.20%	0
17	Peskovatik and Sloboda District	10	26	0.10%	0

== Aftermath ==
The Socialist Bloc emerged as the most voted list. The Bund obtained 11 seats. The Socialist Bloc along with the Internationalists and different national groups formed a majority within the City Duma with 62 seats. The Mensheviks and Duma held a meeting and agreed that the City Duma chairman would be a Menshevik whilst the Mayor would come from the Bund.

The Internationalists achieved a significant electoral victory, seemingly to their own surprise. Per Aronson (1961), it appears that most of the votes for List 6 came from soldiers. The elected City Duma deputies from List 6 included V. Ya. Chunchin, V. V. Kryukov, A. M. Bitte, P. M. Petrov, P. F. Baranov, I. I. Letoshko, E. Ya. Peterson, E. Sh. Tufrin, M. M. Bushman, B. D. Pinson, S. I. Borodovsky, B. B. Martsinkevich, A. M. Vidzis, Z. Ya. Rubin, M. A. Rabkin, and O. K. Gipsel. On August 28, 1917 the committee of the Vitebsk Organization of Internationalists decided to organize its own City Duma faction.

The lists representing property holders (census-based) obtained a total of 19 seats - Kadets, the Polish Bloc, the Latvian Radical Democrats, the Union of Homeowners and the Union of Merchants and Industrialists. Most of the deputies in newly-elected City Duma were Jewish, 52 deputies per the account of Zeltser (1997) - including 22 deputies of the Socialist Bloc, 4 deputies of the Internationalists and 4 deputies of the Kadets.

The newly-elected City Duma held its first formal meeting at the City Theatre in front of a large audience on September 15, 1917. The Menshevik Aleksandr Tarle was elected as City Duma chairman. The Socialist-Revolutionary M. S. Tseitlin was elected Deputy Chairman of the City Duma. No Mayor was elected, as the naming of a Bundist candidate for the role had not yet been resolved. At the inaugural session the Bund proposed a policy of Jewish cultural autonomy, which was opposed by the other Jewish parties who called for national personal autonomy. The Zionists called for right to speak Hebrew in City Duma.

A City Board was formed, consisting of the Mensheviks V. Zarembo (physician) and Z. Gurevich (engineer), the Bundists S. Ryvkin (worker) and E. S. Tseitlin (who was became the City Board secretary), the Socialist-Revolutionary Medvedev and the former business manager of the Military-Industrial Committee I. G. Zaks representing the propertied (census-based) elements.
