= 1917 Smolensk City Duma election =

Local election in Russia

An election to the Smolensk City Duma was held on 5 August [O.S. 23 July] 1917. The election took place in the aftermath of the February Revolution (with Russia being governed by the Provisional Government), part of a series of local elections that year across the country. The election resulted in a victory for the moderate socialist bloc.

== Smolensk in the wake of the February Revolution ==
In the first week of March 1917 the Czarist regime crumbled in Smolensk without significant episodes of violence. Liberals from the old City Duma formed a city administration, the Provisional Executive Committee. B. P. Rachinsky was appointed as mayor. In parallel, the socialist movements emerged from the underground after the fall of the Czarist regime. On March 6, 1917 a local Socialist-Revolutionaries and Mensheviks were elected to head the city Soviet. Under moderate socialist leadership the Smolensk Soviet gave conditional support to the Provisional Government, as was the case of the Petrograd Soviet. For a short moment, wage increases and successes in labour arbitration under the Provisional Government boosted popular support for the moderate socialist among the workers in the city. The local organization of the Socialist-Revolutionaries was led by the journalist and Smolensk Soviet chairman V. V. Podvitsky. The Socialist-Revolutionaries ran the local press in the city. Podvitsky and other local party leaders supported a defencists position. Some younger Socialist-Revolutionaries belonged to the left-wing of the party, such as M. I. Smolentsev of the Socialist-Revolutionary workers group. The Socialist-Revolutionaries recruited new members during the spring of 1917, reaching a point were the party had some 2,000 civilian members and around a 1,000 members in the military garrison. The party members were peasants-soldiers, officers teachers, workers and some government clerks. The Menshevik party organization in Smolensk also grew, reaching a civilian membership of some 600 people - including government clerks, employees, soldiers and workers. Some Menshevik leaders, like S. E. Galperin were part of Plekhanov's defencist faction. On the other hand leaders like S. P. Shur supported the internationalist position of Martov.

Smolensk had no formal Bolshevik party organization, but on March 10, 1917 the Smolensk Socialist Committee (which would become the local Bolshevik organization) announced its existence. The General Jewish Labour Bund held its first meetings after leaving the underground on March 26 and March 28, 1917. The Bund had a following among Jewish workers, artisans, professionals and soldiers. The United Jewish Socialist Workers Party (Fareynikte) held its first meeting at the Jewish Library on March 28, 1917. The following day the Jewish Social Democratic Labour Party (Poale Zion). In the labour union movement the Socialist-Revolutionaries ran the domestic workers union, the Mensheviks controlled the bank employees union, the Bund had the needle trade union, the leather industry workers union was anarchist and the metal workers union was led by the Bolsheviks. By early April 1917 the situation in Smolensk was not, per contemporary journalistic reporting, one of dual power but one of 'multiple power'.

The Smolensk committee of the Party of People's Freedom (also known as the Kadet Party) included P. A. Gubkin, a member of the municipal board, Dr. S. I. Rozenfeld, L. A. Ianchin (bank manager) and F. I. Barnev (shop employee). The Smolensk Kadets were divided into left- and right-wing factions, being split on issues such as the war question, the question of the republic and the question of Duma reform. There were also a number of other organizations of national minorities emerging, the Smolensk Lithuanian Society of Mutual Aid gathered on March 8, 1917. The Smolensk Polish Political Club was constituted on March 19, 1917. Another organization that was set up was the Smolensk Latvian Society.

On April 23, 1917 a joint session of the Provisional Executive Committee and the executive committees of the soviets of officers, soldiers and workers had held. The April 23, 1917 meeting decided to expand the city duma by inducting teachers, physicians, commercial employees, lower clerks, a dozen soldiers and half a dozen workers.

== Election campaign ==
The election campaign began on May 19, as the city administration published electoral guidelines. On the evening of May 20, 1917 the General Jewish Labour Bund issued a call to form a Socialist Bloc to contest the City Duma election. In early June 1917 the Smolensk Socialist Bloc was formed, uniting the Socialist-Revolutionaries, Mensheviks, Popular Socialists and the Jewish socialist parties. The Socialist Bloc accused the sitting City Duma of mismanagement. The Socialist Bloc had an elaborate electoral program - calling for improving working and living conditions for the urban proletariat, to extend municipal services to working-class neigbourhoods, to issue taxes on luxury goods and that the municipality take control over certain industries. On 28 July [O.S. 15 July] 1917, the Smolensk Soviet issued a decision on the upcoming City Duma election that the Bolsheviks would be excluded from the Socialist Bloc list. The Bolshevik faction in the Smolensk Soviet lodged a vehement protest against this decision. During the height of the campaign, the Socialist Bloc held daily meetings at the Ampir Theatre, the Society of People's Universities and other working-class spaces.

In June 1917 the Non-Party Jewish Initiative Group was formed, and some of the socialists joined the group. On June 20, 1917 the Non-Party Jewish Electoral Committee held a public gathering at the Ampir Theatre, at which fierce debate surged over whether a non-party list for the Jewish community be organized. The proposal did not go down well with the Jewish socialists, who argued that an explicitly Jewish list would be perceived as an expression of narrow chauvinism and provoke counter-reactions from non-Jewish populations. Zionists and Akhdut supporters argued in favour of a non-party Jewish list, stating that it could raise issues like the supply of kosher meat. Most of the Bund, Fareynikte and Poale Zion members left the gathering in protest. The Non-Party Jewish Election Committee held a meeting on June 29, 1917 at which an 8-member leadership was elected. It included merchants like N. V. Shvarts and A. I. Gilman. At the time the committee had yet not announced whether it would support the socialists or Kadets or launch its own list. Eventually the Non-Party Jewish Election Committee fielded its own list of candidates, consisting solely of big property owners. Fareynikte renegades A. Bliumberg and M. P. Izabolinsky, and some Zionists, left the project in protest. The Non-Party Jewish Election Committee held ward-level campaign meetings between July 6-9, 1917.

== Results ==
Voting was held on 5 August [O.S. 23 July] 1917. The election was a landslide victory for the Socialist Bloc, which got 20,880 votes and 54 seats in the City Duma. The Kadets got 5,820 votes and 15 seats. The Bolsheviks finished in third place with 1,235 votes and 3 seats. The Non-Party Jewish Election Committee list got 550 seats and failed to win any seat in the City Duma. Other lists obtained 346 votes. After the election the Popular Socialist V. K. Untilov was elected as the new mayor.
