= There is such a party! =

Soviet political catch phrase

There is such a party! is a catch phrase allegedly uttered by Vladimir Lenin on June 17, 1917 at the First All–Russian Congress of Soviets in response to the thesis of the Minister of the Provisional Government Irakli Tsereteli.

== History ==
=== Preceding events ===
After the February Revolution, the leaders of the Socialist Mensheviks Fedor Dan, Mikhail Lieber, Irakli Tsereteli and Nikolay Chkheidze were members of the Petrograd Soviet and in this capacity advocated active cooperation between the Soviet and the Provisional Government. Having occupied some of the ministerial posts, the socialists actively implemented elements of their political program. Thus, the Minister of Agriculture, Socialist Revolutionary Viktor Chernov, legalized the right of peasants to uncultivated land, despite the protests of the landowners; Social Democrat Labor Minister Matvey Skobelev introduced compulsory health insurance for industrial workers, the right of trade unions to resolve labor disputes in court, and other measures that significantly alleviated the situation of workers. For Lenin, any form of cooperation with the government was a betrayal of the revolution.

Meanwhile, the situation in the country continued to deteriorate steadily: desertions were gaining momentum in the army; in the countryside, chaos and lawlessness reigned, accompanied by self–seizure of land and the destruction of property of landowners. The most important question of ending the war remained unresolved. The interim government lost control over the regions: local councils behaved as if they were government bodies. In this situation, the First All–Russian Congress of Soviets was convened in Petrograd.

=== Congress of Soviets ===
The First All–Russian Congress of Soviets was held from June 16 to July 7, 1917. It was attended by over a thousand deputies, of whom 822 had the right to vote. The Bolshevik delegation had 105 seats at the Congress, significantly inferior to both the Socialist Revolutionaries (285 seats) and the Mensheviks (248 seats).

On the first day of the Congress, June 3, in the speech of the Chairman of the Petrograd Soviet, Irakli Tsereteli, the question was raised: can any of the delegates name a party that would risk taking power into its own hands and taking responsibility for everything that happens in Russia. Lenin, who was present in the hall, remained silent and did not interrupt the speaker. The next day, June 4, Lenin was given the floor for a 15-minute speech, in which the word "is!" (without the words "such a party"), as well as a reference to the speech of Irakli Tsereteli on the previous day of the Congress. Lenin said, literally, the following:

Now, a number of countries are on the eve of their death, and those practical measures that are supposedly so complicated that it is difficult to introduce them, that they must be specially developed, as the previous speaker, the citizen Minister of Posts and Telegraphs, said – these measures are quite clear. He said that there is no political party in Russia that would express its readiness to take power entirely upon itself. I answer: "There is! Not a single party can refuse this, and our party does not refuse it: every minute it is ready to take power entirely". (Applause, laughter). You can laugh as much as you like, but if a citizen minister puts us in front of this question next to the right–wing party, he will receive a proper answer.

— Vladimir Lenin. Speech About the Attitude Towards the Provisional Government. Complete Works, Volume 32, Page 267

According to Robert Service, Lenin's words drew thunderous applause among the Bolsheviks, but the overwhelming majority of the congress participants did not take them seriously, there was a laugh in the hall (in the above transcript there is "laughter, applause" after Lenin's words).

Lenin himself mentioned this in his later work of the same year, "Will the Bolsheviks Retain State Power?" so: "... Will the Bolsheviks dare to take the entire state power into their own hands? I already had a chance at the All–Russian Congress of Soviets to answer with a categorical statement to this question in one remark that I happened to shout from my seat during one of Tsereteli's ministerial speeches".

== In Soviet Union ==
Evgeny Kibrik. "There is Such a Party!", 1947

The authors of the memoirs published in the Soviet Union claimed that the phrase "There is such a party!" sounded like a replica from a place at the time of Tsereteli's speech, and this phrase "shocked the audience", "sounded like a thunderclap" and the like.

== Cultural significance ==
In the Soviet Union, the phrase was widely known: it was quoted in history textbooks, speeches, literature, drama and other works of Soviet official art. (Note: For example, in 1959, a novel–trilogy by the functionary writer Arkady Vasiliev (long–term Secretary of the Party Organization of the Moscow Branch of the Union of Writers of the Soviet Union, Deputy of the Moscow Council, member of the Editorial Board of the Moscow Magazine) was published, the title of which was the phrase «There is Such a Party!») Some of these works continue to be performed in the post–Soviet period. For example, the song "There is Such a Party!" from the repertoire of the Song and Dance Ensemble of the Russian Army:

Party, party, reason and conscience of the people,
Your decisions inspire hearts.
Lenin told everyone in the distant years:
"There is such a party!"
"There is such a party!"
We will be faithful to you until the end!

In post–Soviet times, the expression is usually used in a figurative sense, not associated with Lenin, the Bolsheviks and politics in general; it is used to figuratively emphasize the existence, presence of an object or phenomenon, as well as in various jokes and anecdotes:

- In the film The Weather is Good on Deribasovskaya, or It is Raining Again on Brighton Beach, the leader of the mafia Actor, disguised as Lenin, says: (Note: The word «партия» in Russian is homonym: it means both a political party and a batch of goods)

There is such a party! A wonderful batch of ... drugs from Thailand!

- Mikhail Savelichev's Tiger, Light Burning Tiger!:

And when the archivist began to regret his untimely interrupted career, Moisey with difficulty suppressed the desire to shout the famous – "There is such a party!".

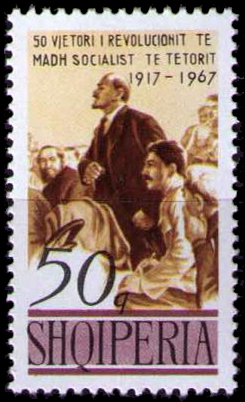

== Sources ==
- Revolution and Civil War in Russia: 1917–1923. Encyclopedia in 4 Volumes. Great Encyclopedia. Vol. 3. Moscow: Terra. 2008. p. 286. ISBN 978-5-273-00563-1.
- Dushenko, Konstantin (1997). "Lenin Vladimir Ilyich (1870–1924), Leader of the Bolshevik Party and the Soviet State. Quote No. 145". Dictionary of Modern Quotations. Moscow: Agraf. ISBN 5-7784-0031-4.
- Kotlyarov, Igor (2011). "Political Party Concept; Essence, Meaning, Definition". Sociology of Political Parties. Minsk: Belarusian Science. ISBN 978-985-08-1282-7.
- Service, Robert (2002). Lenin. Biography. Translated by G. I. Levitan. Moscow: Potpourri. ISBN 985-438-591-4.
- Maxim Gorky, Vyacheslav Molotov, Kliment Voroshilov, Sergei Kirov, Andrei Zhdanov, Andrei Bubnov, Yan Gamarnik, Joseph Stalin. A. L. Birman, Vadim Bystryansky, Maxim Gorky, Semyon Dimanstein, L. G. Doletsky, Lev Kritsman, Nikolai Krylenko, Mikhail Kubanin, Dmitry Manuilsky, Isaac Mints, Vladimir Milyutin, Osip Pyatnitsky, Fedor Raskolnikov, Alexey Stetsky, Boris Tal, M. P. Tolstukha, A. Zh. Ugarov, R. N. Eideman (1936). History of the Civil War in the Soviet Union. Volume I. Preparation of the Great Proletarian Revolution. (From the Beginning of the War to the Beginning of October 1917). Moscow: Association of State Book and Magazine Publishing Houses.
- Central Archive. First All–Russian Congress of Soviets of Workers' and Soldiers' Deputies. Volume I – Moscow: State Publishing House, 1930
- Victor Chernov. Lenin // "People's Cause". No. 26, April 16, 1917
