= 1917 Minsk City Duma election =

Election

An election to the Minsk City Duma was held on 30 July 1917. A total of 102 deputies were elected in Minsk. Some 105,000 civilians and 24,000 soldiers were eligible to vote. The election was preceded by an active election campaign, with campaign rallies, campaigns vehicles crossing through the city and buildings covered by posters for the different candidate lists. The voting occurred in orderly fashion, with voters queuing for hours from the early morning. The socialist parties formed a majority coalition after the election, with the Bundist Arn Vaynshteyn becoming the new city duma chairman.

== Background ==
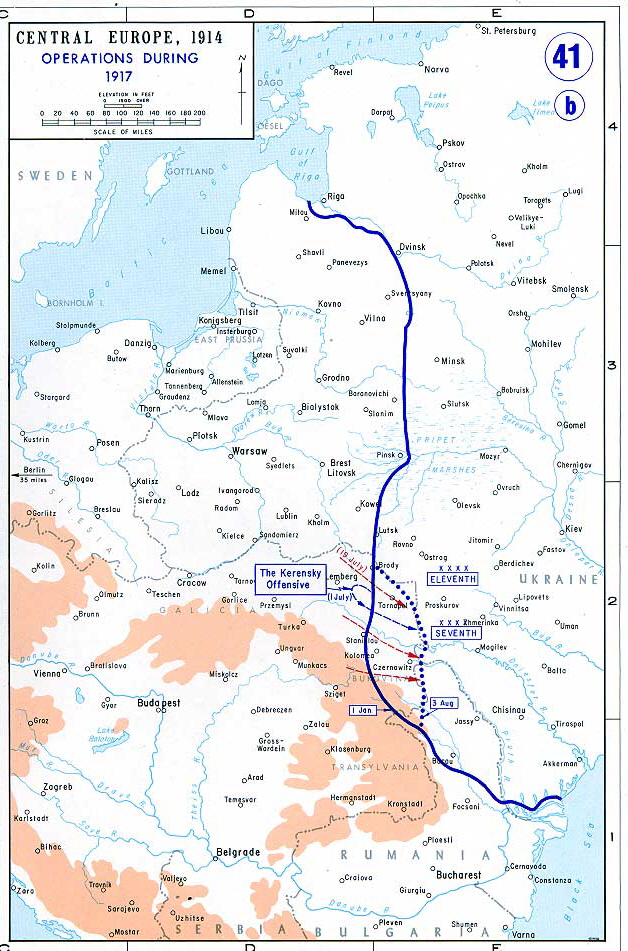
Proximity of Minsk to the World War I Russian western front, and to Petrograd (St Petersburg) in 1917

In July 1917 (Julian calendar), the 2nd Machine Gun Regiment, supported by the Bolsheviks, refused to send men to the World War I front and marched around the factories until they had "tens of thousands" marching with them to the Executive Committee of the Soviets in Petrograd. The government was afraid; there were power shifts there, and defences were prepared. 500,000 workers and soldiers demonstrated in Petrograd, encouraged by Vladimir Lenin, and there was a general strike. The demonstrators were persuaded to return home, but the government was now on the offensive. The printing machines and buildings of Pravda were destroyed, and some of its employees killed. The Bolshevik Committee's premises were "ransacked" and the situation elevated almost to martial law, with supporters of the Bolsheviks and of Lenin arrested if identified. The government set up a siege around 120 Kronstadt sailors and a group of Red Guards (factory workers' militia). Stalin mediated, the general strike ended, and the sailors went home. However, a "massive show of force" of Stalin's soldiers took over Petrograd. The head of government, Georgy Lvov, resigned, leaving Alexander Kerensky to make "false promises" in an attempt to broker peace, while Lenin retreated to an unspecified location. To discourage rebellious soldiers who were fighting to quell the rebellion, drumhead courts-martial and summary executions for retreating at the front were permitted by the government. Meanwhile, although Minsk was close to the World War I front line, and although it had been involved in political struggles and changes, including taking in a great influx of refugees to help with agriculture, during July 1917 it was at peace in that it was not a theatre of war or revolution.

== List of parties ==
=== List 1 – Russian Nationalists ===
List 1 won three seats in the city duma, Valentin Minich was the faction head. Minich, of the Russian Democratic Party, fiercely opposed the introduction of Belarusian language education.

=== List 3 – Jewish National Bloc ===
The Orthodox Agudath Israel and the non-socialist Zionists formed an electoral bloc. Five out of the 16 deputies of the Jewish National Bloc were Zionists.

=== List 4 – Socialist-Revolutionaries ===
According to contemporary press reports, the majority of the soldiers at the Minsk garrison voted for the SR list.

The SR deputies elected to the city duma were Ivan Nesterov, Metlin I.I., Levitas A.R., Zalmanov N.D., Sergei Kovalik, Pavel Kashchenko, Pavel Zlobin, Utevsky I.B., Kizillo L. I., Gembitsky B.Kh., Belkind G.M., Levinsky P.L., Zimionko A.G., Bragin F.S., Marshak M.I., Baskin Ya.B., Grigoriev N.F., Serafimovich S.G., Pigulevsky P.M., Dobrotvorskaya A.S., Astakhov S.A., Khitrov I.I., Ivashchenko I.P., Sokoldynsky E.S., Lebedz I.I., Kireev I. M., Dobrotvorsky V.V., Kernozhitsky V.I., Golynets I.M., Radkevich S.Ya, Lebedeva V.M. and Kuzmin I.I.

=== List 5 - Social Democrats ===
A joint social democratic list was presented, with candidates from the General Jewish Labour Bund, the Bolsheviks and the Mensheviks.

Ten Bundists, six Bolsheviks and six Mensheviks were elected from the social democratic list. Vasily Vashkevich, Kārlis Landers, I. F. Skuratowicz, V. Golubeva and Nevsky were among the Bolshevik members of the city duma. Maria Frumkin-Wichman and Evgenia Gurvich were among the elected Bundists.

After the election, a united social democratic faction was formed in the city duma with 30 members. However, this faction was divided into two sub factions – a Bundist-Menshevik sub faction and a Bolshevik-Polish Socialist Union sub faction. Frumkin headed the former sub faction, Heltman the latter.

L. Skarżynski became a city duma member, from the social democratic list on 9 September 1917, after Kwiatkowski resigned.

=== List 7 – Polish Electoral Committee ===
The Agricultural Syndicate director Mieczysław Porowski headed the Polish Electoral Committee (PKW) faction in the new city duma. Other members of the PKW faction in the city duma were Ignacy Witkiewicz (lawyer and head of the food committee – on 28 September 1917, Witkiewicz resigned from the city duma and was replaced by Józef Święcicki), Feliks Kryżan (tram conductor), Edmund Iwaszkiewicz (lawyer), Marian Jankowski (Polish school teacher), Lucjan Żołądkowski (priest, he was soon replaced by Stanisław Dobraszczyc), Ernest Ambroszkiewicz (lawyer), Józef Pawłowicz (representing the suburbs), Wiktor Janczewski (lawyer), Stanisław Chrząstowski (former mayor), Konstanty Demidecki-Demidowicz (assistant to the provincial commissioner, attorney) and Władysław Korzon (engineer).

=== List 9 – Kadets ===
Dr. S.V. Balkovets, who had been elected as head of the Kadet Party Minsk Committee in May 1917, headed the Kadet faction in the new city duma. Another of the three Kadets in the new city duma was Uladzimir Samoila, well-known publicist.

=== List 12 – Bloc of National Socialist Parties ===
Various nationality-oriented socialist parties united around the list of the Bloc of National Socialist Parties – the Belarusian Socialist Assembly, the Belarusian Socialist People's Party, Ukrainian Social Democratic Labour Party, Ukrainian Socialist-Revolutionary Party, Jewish Social Democratic Labour Party (Poalei Zion), the United Jewish Socialist Workers Party (Fareynikte) and the Lithuanian Socialist People's Party.

List 12 won four seats, shared between the Belarusian and Jewish parties. Arkadź Smolič (Belarusian Socialist Assembly) and Leanard Zajac (Belarusian Socialist-Populist) were elected to the new city duma. The two Belarusian nationalist deputies sided with the SRs in the city duma after the election. Among the Jewish parties, Poalei Zion and Fareynikte won one seat each.

The candidate of the Lithuanian Socialist-Populists, the people's educator A.I. Yashkevich, occupied the 17th slot of the list (and thus did not get elected).

=== List 13 – Polish Socialist Union ===
After the February Revolution the Social Democracy of the Kingdom of Poland and Lithuania (SDKPiL) and the section of Polish Socialist Party – Left (PPS-Lewica) formed the Polish Socialist Union (PZS), and contested the election with a list of their own. PZS sought to confront nationalist and bourgeois influences among Polish workers. As PZS moved closer towards the Bolsheviks, a faction of the PPS-Lewica broke away from PZS and formed an 'independent Polish socialist' faction in the summer of 1917. However, under the leadership of Stefan Heltman, Jadwiga Moszyńska-Heltman, Stanisław Berson and others, PZS reaffirmed its internationalist line and deepened their cooperation with the Bolsheviks.

PZS achieved an unexpected success in the city duma election, winning 8 seats. Members of the PZS faction in the new city duma were Stefan Heltman (agronomist), Paweł Jakubowski (saddler), Witold Falkowski (surveyor), Stanisław Zaniewski (agronomist), Julian Bassak (clerk – on 28 September 1917, Bassak resigned and Stanisław Jankowski took his seat), Michał Świdziński (craftsman), Stanisław Berson (driver) and Jan Kowalewski (craftsman). In the city duma PZS aligned with the Bolsheviks, and would support the Bolsheviks in the 1917 Russian Constituent Assembly election.

== Results ==
List	Votes	%	Seats
List 4 – Socialist-Revolutionaries	22,684	31.33%	33
List 5 – Social Democrats (Bund, Bolsheviks, Mensheviks)	15,506	21.42%	22
List 3 – Jewish National Bloc	11,426	15.78%	16
List 7 – Polish Electoral Committee	8,805	12.16%	12
List 13 – Polish Socialist Union	5,675	7.84%	8
List 12 – Bloc of National Socialist Parties	2,625	3.63%	4
List 9 – Kadets	2,295	3.17%	3
List 1 – Russian Nationalists	1,880	2.60%	3
List 11 – Jewish Non-Party List	908	1.25%	1
List 14 – Jewish Suburban Communities	188	0.26%	0
List 2 – Non-Party Socialists	123	0.17%	0
List 10 – Small shopkeepers	120	0.17%	0
List 8 – Labour Party of the Suburbs	101	0.14%	0
List 6	66	0.09%	0
Total	72,402		102

== New city government ==
After the election the Socialist-Revolutionaries and social democrats formed a majority bloc in the new city duma. The newly elected city duma held its first meeting on 9 August 1917. The Bundist Arn Vaynshteyn was elected city duma chairman. Sergei Kovalik (Socialist-Revolutionary) was elected deputy chairman of the city duma. Socialist-Revolutionary, native of Tver Governorate and Saint Petersburg University graduate Pavel Kashchenko was elected mayor by the city duma, receiving 56 votes in favor, 1 abstention and 28 votes against. Other members of the city board were N. Zalmanov (SR), G. Bielkind (SR), L. Skarżynski (social democrat) and Heltman (PZS). Evgenia Gurvich became the city duma secretary.

The ruling coalition came under criticism from not including a broader range of parties in the governance. In response, Vaynshteyn set up a senior college of the city duma with Minich, Frumkin-Wichmann, Heltman, Chaim Churgin, Porowski and Balkovets as its members.

== See also ==
- 1917 Astrakhan City Duma election
- 1917 Baku City Duma election
- November 1917 Yekaterinburg City Duma election
- 1917 Kiev City Duma election
- 1917 Russian municipal elections
- 1917 Odessa City Duma election
