= Establishment of Soviet power in Russia (1917–1918) =

Russian Civil War

The Establishment of Soviet power in Russia (in Soviet historiography, «Triumphal Procession of Soviet Power») was the process of establishing Soviet power throughout the territory of the former Russian Empire, with the exception of areas occupied by the troops of the Central Powers, following the seizure of power by Bolsheviks in Petrograd on 7 November 1917 [O.S. 25 October], and in mostly completed by the beginning of the German offensive along the entire front on February 18, 1918.

== Overview ==
The period from November 1917 to February 1918 was distinguished by the relative speed and ease of establishing the power of the Bolsheviks and eliminating the armed resistance of their opponents (near Petrograd, in Moscow, Ukraine, Don, Kuban, etc.). This period was characterized by the presence of a broad social support among the Bolsheviks: they decisively liquidated landlord ownership, transferred land to the peasants, began to withdraw Russia from the war, introduced workers' control in industry, recognized the right of the peoples of the former empire to acquire state independence, therefore the population supported them. This massive support compensated for the numerical and organizational weakness of the armed forces of the Bolsheviks (detachments of the Red Guard, revolutionary–minded sailors and soldiers of the old army).

At the same time, the Soviets themselves, as organs of power, did not always support the seizure of power by the Bolsheviks. In cases where individual councils did not agree to become the organs of the dictatorship of the Russian Social Democratic Labor Party (Bolsheviks), the Bolsheviks did not hesitate to disperse and replace them with extraordinary bodies – revolutionary committees, military revolutionary committees, etc. This shows that their goal was to establish the dictatorship of their own party, and its concrete form in the form of "Soviet power" was not so important.

Anti–Bolshevik forces (volunteer officers, Cossacks of rear units, cadets) in the first post–October months did not have significant social support, so their attempts to organize resistance at the front and in the Cossack regions were relatively weak. The Don Ataman Alexey Kaledin failed to rouse the front–line Cossacks to fight against the Bolshevik regime, since the Cossacks, tired of the war, did not want to fight the Bolsheviks who had ended the war. For the same reason, Generals Mikhail Alekseev and Lavr Kornilov were unable to form a large army of volunteers on the Don.

The elimination of the first centers of resistance and anti-Bolshevik armed formations was not completed due to the poor work of the still weak bodies of Soviet power and the low combat effectiveness of the Red Guard detachments and units of the Red Army. In the cities of the Volga region, Siberia and other regions, underground officers' organizations multiplied. The Volunteer Army managed to survive and retain the main officer cadres. During this period, the White movement experienced a kind of underground partisan period of formation, when the ideological, organizational, personnel and material foundations of the future white governments and their armies were laid.

== Establishment of Soviet power. Beginning of the organization of anti–Bolshevik forces ==
Red Guard in Chelyabinsk, 1917–1918

One of the main circumstances that allowed the Bolsheviks to carry out the socialist revolution, and then quite quickly seize power in many regions and cities of the Russian Empire, was the presence in the large cities of Russia of numerous reserve battalions that did not want to go to the front. It was the promise of an immediate end to the war with Germany that predetermined the transition of the Russian army, which had decayed during the Kerensky era, to the side of the Bolsheviks, which ensured their subsequent victory. At first, in most regions of the country, the establishment of Bolshevik power proceeded quickly and peacefully: out of 84 provincial and other large cities, only in fifteen Soviet power was established as a result of an armed struggle. This gave the Bolsheviks a reason to talk about the "triumphal march of Soviet power" in the period from October 1917 to February 1918.

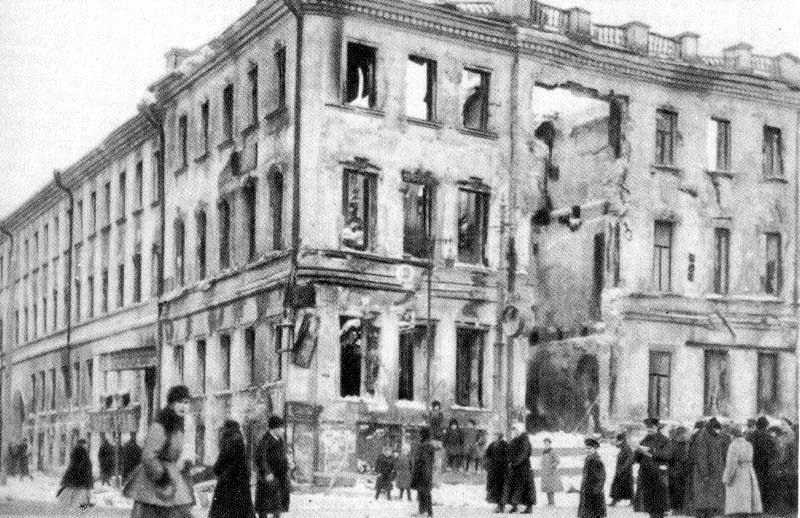
A building on Nikitskiyi Vorota square in Moscow destroyed by artillery during the Bolshevik uprising

The victory of the uprising in Petrograd marked the beginning of the transfer of power into the hands of the Soviets in all major cities of Russia. In particular, the establishment of Soviet power in Moscow took place only after the arrival of the Red Guards from Petrograd. In the central regions of Russia (Ivanovo–Voznesensk, Orekhovo–Zuevo, Shuya, Kineshma, Kostroma, Tver, Bryansk, Yaroslavl, Ryazan, Vladimir, Kovrov, Kolomna, Serpukhov, Podolsk and others), even before the October Socialist Revolution, many local Soviets were in fact in the power of the Bolsheviks, and therefore they took power there quite easily. This process was more complicated in Tula, Kaluga, Nizhny Novgorod, where the influence of the Bolsheviks in the Soviets was insignificant. However, having occupied key positions by armed detachments, the Bolsheviks achieved the "re–election" of the Soviets and took power into their own hands.

In the industrial cities of the Volga region, the Bolsheviks seized power immediately after Petrograd and Moscow. In Kazan, the command of the military district, in a bloc with the socialist parties and Tatar nationalists, tried to disarm the Bolshevized artillery reserve brigade, but the Red Guards occupied the station, post office, telephone, telegraph, bank, surrounded the Kremlin, arrested the commander of the district troops and the Commissioner of the Provisional Government, and on November 8 the city was captured by the Bolsheviks. From November 1917 to January 1918, the Bolsheviks established their power in the provincial towns of the Kazan Governorate. In Samara, the Bolsheviks under the leadership of Valerian Kuibyshev took power on November 8. On November 9–11, overcoming the resistance of the Socialist Revolutionary–Menshevik "Salvation Committee" and the Cadet Duma, the Bolsheviks won in Saratov. In Tsaritsyn, they fought for power from November 10 to 17. In Astrakhan, fighting continued until February 7, 1918. By this time, the power of the Bolsheviks had been established throughout the Volga region.

On November 7–8, 1917, the Bolsheviks seized power in Narva, Revel, Yuryev, Pärnu, and in the following days – throughout the entire Baltic territory not occupied by the Germans. The plenum of the executive committee of the Council of Workers', Soldiers' and Landless Deputies of Latvia (Latvian Riflemen) on November 21–22 recognized the authority of the Council of People's Commissars. The Congress of Workers, Riflemen and Landless Deputies (made up of Bolsheviks and Left Social Revolutionaries) in Valmiera on December 29–31 formed the pro–Bolshevik government of Latvia, headed by Fricis Rozin.

In November 1917, congresses of Soviets of Workers' and Soldiers' Deputies of the Western Oblast, the 3rd Congress of Peasants' Deputies of the Minsk and Vilna Provinces and the 2nd Congress of the Armies of the Western Front were held in Minsk, the executive committee of the Soviets of Workers', Soldiers' and Peasants' Deputies of the Western Region and Front and the Council of People's Commissars were formed Western region. The Great Belarusian Rada did not recognize the authority of the executive committee of the Soviets of Workers', Soldiers' and Peasants' Deputies of the Western Region and the Front, considering it as an exclusively front–line organ. The First All–Belarusian Congress, convened by the Great Belarusian Rada, was dispersed by the Bolsheviks. In January – February 1918, the anti–Bolshevik uprising of the Polish Corps of General Dovbor–Musnitsky was suppressed, and power in the large cities of Belarus passed to the Bolsheviks.

The Ukrainian Central Rada took advantage of the fall of the Provisional Government to gain full power in Ukraine. After the failed Bolshevik uprising and the withdrawal from Kiev of troops loyal to the Provisional Government, the Central Rada on November 20 proclaimed the Ukrainian People's Republic on the territory of eight provinces: Kiev, Volyn, Podolsk, Kherson, Chernigov, Poltava, Kharkov, Yekaterinoslav and the districts of Northern Tavria. The leadership of the Ukrainian People's Republic did not recognize the results of the October Socialist Revolution in Russia and sought to prevent a repetition of the Petrograd riots in the Ukrainian provinces. The Central Rada declared its complete disobedience to the Petrograd Soviet of People's Commissars and sought to turn Kiev into the center of the creation of a new Russia as a federation of autonomous republics. Rada agreed to an alliance with the ataman of the Don Host Kaledin.

Having received news of the successful Bolshevik uprising in Petrograd, the Bolsheviks of the Lugansk region, who by that time had a majority in many Soviets, proclaimed the transfer of power locally to the Soviets by peaceful means, despite the opposition of the national democratic forces and moderate socialists. The Bolsheviks of Donbas took power in Lugansk, Makeyevka, Gorlovka, Kramatorsk and other cities. In the Donbas, the formation of the Red Guard units began.

In Rostov–on–Don, Soviet power was proclaimed on November 8. On the same day, military ataman Alexey Kaledin in Novocherkassk introduced martial law in the Oblast of the Don Army. The military (Cossack) government assumed the entirety of state power in the Oblast. On November 15, General Alekseev, who arrived in Novocherkassk, announced the beginning of the formation of the Volunteer Army to fight the Bolsheviks and continue the war with an external enemy (Central Powers). On November 20, ataman Kaledin announced that the Military Government did not recognize the Bolshevik government, and therefore the Oblast was proclaimed independent until the legitimate Russian government was formed. On December 15, after fierce battles, volunteer detachments and the troops of General Kaledin drove the Bolsheviks out of Rostov, and then from Taganrog, and launched an offensive on Donbas.

Meanwhile, the Central Rada refused to satisfy the demand of the government of Soviet Russia to allow Soviet troops to pass through the territory of Ukraine, heading for the Don against the ataman Kaledin. On December 9, the Council of People's Commissars issued an appeal to the entire population "On the Fight Against the Counter–Revolutionary Uprising of Kaledin, Kornilov, Dutov, Supported by the Central Rada". It was clear to the Soviet leadership that the defeat of the supporters of Soviet power in Rostov opened the way for the further advance of the Kaledin forces into the depths of the Donetsk basin and further north. It was possible to stop them only by using and gaining a foothold in those territories that the Central Rada proclaimed Ukrainian.

On December 19, the Council of People's Commissars formed the Southern Revolutionary Front to Fight Counter–Revolution. Vladimir Antonov–Ovseenko was appointed commander–in–chief of the front.

Beginning on December 21, Soviet troops under the general command of Antonov–Ovseenko began to arrive in Kharkov, a key railway junction in the direction of southern Russia. With the arrival of Soviet troops, a group of delegates who left the All–Ukrainian Congress of Soviets in Kiev (Bolsheviks, part of the Ukrainian Left Socialist Revolutionaries and several Ukrainian Social Democrats) arrived in Kharkiv, who were joined by the deputies of the 3rd Regional Congress of Soviets of Donbas and Kryvyi Rih. On December 24–25, in Kharkov, an alternative to Kiev, the 1st All–Ukrainian Congress of Soviets, was held, at which the Ukrainian People's Republic of Soviets was proclaimed. On January 1, 1918, the Council of People's Commissars recognized the People's Secretariat of the Ukrainian People's Republic of Soviets as the only legitimate government of Ukraine.

Meanwhile, Antonov–Ovseenko transferred the command of the troops stationed in Ukraine to his chief of staff Muravyov, and he himself led the fight against the Don Cossack troops. A significant part of the Cossacks did not support Kaledin and took neutrality. As a result of two months of bloody battles, Soviet troops and units of the Red Guard occupied Taganrog on February 10, 1918, took Rostov on February 23, and Novocherkassk on February 25. The small detachments of the Volunteer Army, consisting of officers, cadets and high school students, could no longer hold back the advance of the Red troops, and on February 10, General Kornilov informed Kaledin that the volunteers were leaving for the Kuban. Having lost the support of the front–line Cossacks and not seeing an opportunity to stop the Bolshevik detachments, on February 11, Kaledin resigned as a military chieftain and shot himself on the same day. The remnants of the White Cossack troops retreated to the Salsk steppes. The volunteer army (4–5 thousand people) began a retreat with battles to the Kuban (First Kuban Campaign), hoping to receive the support of the Kuban Cossacks, however, these calculations were not justified: the Kuban Cossacks, like the Don Cossacks, did not want to fight against the new government. Volunteers, who were in a hostile environment of the local peasant population and the revolutionary–minded units of the old army returning from the front, had to wage a heavy guerrilla war in the Kuban for survival.

The presence of Soviet troops in the Kharkov province and preparations for hostilities in the Donbas and the Don contributed to the activation of forces in Ukraine hostile to the Central Rada. On January 8, 1918, Soviet power was established in Yekaterinoslav. On January 8–9, the troops of Antonov–Ovseenko captured the largest industrial centers of Lugansk and Mariupol. On the night of January 10, in Kharkov, local Red Guard formations disarmed two regiments of the Ukrainian People's Republic. By January 15, Aleksandrovsk was occupied, which made it possible to establish contact with the Crimea. On January 18, Soviet power was established in Odessa.

The proclamation of Soviet power in Kharkov and the occupation by the Bolsheviks of a number of industrial centers in Eastern and Southern Ukraine, while maintaining the Central Rada in Kiev, which declared the independence of Ukraine, inevitably led to the transition of the struggle for power in Ukraine between the Bolsheviks and the Central Rada into an acute phase. On January 17, the Soviet government of Ukraine officially declared war on the Central Rada. On January 18, Antonov–Ovseenko issued a directive on the general offensive of Soviet troops against the Central Rada. The main blow was delivered from Kharkov to Poltava during further movement to Kiev. The general management of the operation was entrusted to the Chief of Staff of the Southern Group of Forces, Mikhail Muravyov.

On January 22, against the background of the unfolding offensive of the Soviet troops, the Malaya Rada proclaimed the independence of the Ukrainian People's Republic, instructing the new government of the Ukrainian People's Republic – the Council of People's Ministers – to begin independent peace negotiations with the states of the Austro–German bloc.

On February 8, Kiev was taken by the red troops. Muravyov organized a "red terror" in the city – during the several days of his army's stay in the city, at least 2 thousand people were shot, mostly Russian officers. With the move to Kiev from Kharkov of the Ukrainian Soviet government, the troops under the command of Muravyov were sent to Odessa. In the meantime, a government delegation from the Central Rada, who fled from Kiev, signed a separate peace treaty with the Central Powers in Brest–Litovsk, and on February 13 turned to Germany and Austria–Hungary with a request for help against Soviet troops. The German command on the same day gave its preliminary consent to enter the war against the Bolsheviks and began to actively prepare for a campaign against Ukraine. The offensive along the entire front line was deployed on February 18.

In Crimea, on November 26, 1917, in the Khan Palace in Bakhchisarai, the Crimean People's Republic was proclaimed, a board of directors (Directory) was appointed – the National Government, headed by Noman Chelebidzhikhan. In Sevastopol, the Bolsheviks took power on December 29, 1917. On January 25–26, 1918, after armed clashes with Crimean Tatar formations, Soviet power was established in Simferopol, and in January 1918 – throughout the Crimea.

The Cossack government of the Kuban, under the leadership of Ataman Filimonov, announced that it did not recognize the new government. On March 14, the red troops of Ivan Sorokin occupied Yekaterinodar. The troops of the Kuban Rada under the command of General Pokrovsky withdrew to the north, where they joined up with the troops of the approaching Volunteer Army. On April 9–13, their combined forces under the command of General Kornilov unsuccessfully stormed Ekaterinodar. Kornilov was killed, and General Denikin, who replaced him, was forced to withdraw the remnants of the White Guard troops to the southern regions of the Don region, where at that time a Cossack uprising against Soviet power began.

Two–thirds of the Soviets of the Urals were Bolsheviks, therefore in most cities and industrial settlements of the Urals (Yekaterinburg, Ufa, Chelyabinsk, Izhevsk and others), power passed to the Bolsheviks without difficulty. More difficult, but peacefully, the Bolsheviks managed to take power in Perm. A stubborn armed struggle for power unfolded in the Orenburg Governorate, where on November 8, the ataman of the Orenburg Cossacks, Dutov, announced the non–recognition of the power of the Bolsheviks on the territory of the Orenburg Cossack army and took control of Orenburg, Chelyabinsk, Verkhneuralsk. Only on January 18, 1918, as a result of the joint actions of the Bolsheviks of Orenburg and the Red detachments of Vasily Blucher that approached the city, Orenburg was captured. Before leaving Orenburg, Dutov disbanded his troops. Some went towards Yekaterinburg. Dutov himself, accompanied by several officers, went to Verkhneuralsk – the second capital of the Orenburg Cossacks, where a new army was formed. This army went with the refugees to the capital of the Turgai region – the city of Turgai in the Turgai steppe.

In Siberia, Soviet power was most firmly established along the line of the Siberian railway, waterways, and in large settlements. On February 26, 1918, at the 2nd Congress of Soviets, the Siberian Council of People's Commissars was elected, consisting of 11 Bolsheviks and 4 Left SRs and the Siberian Central Executive Committee. The mainstay of Soviet power were local small communist detachments, and at the same time the Red Army was formed on a volunteer basis. In the Far East, Soviets were also formed, and power was in the hands of the Far Eastern Regional Committee of the Council of Workers, Peasants and Cossack Deputies. The seizure of power was accomplished painlessly everywhere, with the exception of Irkutsk, where the local revolutionary forces had to endure a stubborn struggle with the troops of the Provisional Government: in December 1917 – January 1918, the red troops suppressed the cadets' uprising in Irkutsk. In Transbaikalia, Ataman Semyonov raised an uprising, but it was almost immediately suppressed. The remnants of the ataman's Cossack detachments withdrew to the area of the Manchuria station (on the border of Transbaikalia and China).

On November 28, 1917, the Transcaucasian Commissariat was created in Tiflis, which declared the independence of Transcaucasia and united the Georgian Social Democrats (Mensheviks), Armenian (Dashnaks) and Azerbaijani (Musavatists) nationalists. Relying on national formations and White Guards, the commissariat extended its power to the entire Transcaucasus, except for the Baku region, where Soviet power was established. In relation to Soviet Russia and the Bolshevik party, the Transcaucasian Commissariat took an openly hostile position, supporting all the anti–Bolshevik forces of the North Caucasus – in the Kuban, Don, Terek and Dagestan in a joint struggle against Soviet power and its supporters in the Transcaucasus. On February 23, 1918, the Transcaucasian Seim was convened in Tiflis. This legislative body included deputies elected from Transcaucasia to the Constituent Assembly, and representatives of local political parties. On April 22, the Seimas adopted a resolution on the proclamation of Transcaucasia as an independent Transcaucasian Democratic Federative Republic.

In Turkestan, in the central city of the region – in Tashkent, the Bolsheviks seized power as a result of fierce battles in the city (in its European part, the so–called "new" city), which lasted for several days. On the side of the Bolsheviks were the armed formations of workers of the railway workshops, and on the side of the anti–Bolshevik forces were the officers of the Russian army and students of the cadet corps and the school of ensigns located in Tashkent. In January 1918, the Bolsheviks suppressed the anti–Bolshevik actions of the Cossack formations under the command of Colonel Zaitsev in Samarkand and Chardzhou, in February they liquidated the Kokand Autonomy, and in early March – the Semirechye Cossack government in the city of Verny. All of Central Asia and Kazakhstan, except for the Khiva Khanate and the Bukhara Emirate, fell under the control of the Bolsheviks. In March, the revolutionary forces of Turkestan, together with the Young Bukharians, made an unsuccessful attempt to overthrow the Bukhara Emir, which went down in history as the Kolesovsky campaign. In April, the Turkestan Autonomous Socialist Soviet Republic was proclaimed.

== Bolsheviks and the Army in the Field ==
On November 10, 1917, the Council of People's Commissars adopted a decree "On the Gradual Reduction in the Size of the Army". According to him, the soldiers of the draft of 1899 were dismissed in an indefinite supply, then until the end of December 1900 and 1901. The haste in carrying out demobilization was caused by the massive unauthorized departure of soldiers from the front, which began after the announcement of the first decrees of the Soviet government, especially the "Decree on Land". There was no one to stop desertion during this period: the officer corps was widely removed from command, the Bolshevik revolutionary committees and the Bolshevik soldiers' committees fought for power, simultaneously carrying out democratization and concluding local truces with the enemy. On January 3, 1918, the demobilization of the 1902 conscripts was announced, January 10 – 1903, January 16 – 1904–1907, January 29 – 1908–1909, February 16 – 1910–1912, March 2 – 1913–1915. The soldiers of the last four years of conscription (1916–1919) were demobilized before April 12, 1918.

Lieutenant General Dukhonin, after Kerensky's flight, acting as the supreme commander, refused to carry out the orders of the government elected by the 2nd Congress of Soviets. On November 19, he released Generals Kornilov and Denikin from prison.

In the Baltic Fleet, the power of the Bolsheviks was established by the Central Committee of the Baltic Fleet under their control, placing the entire power of the fleet at the disposal of the Petrograd Military Revolutionary Committee. In late October – early November 1917, in all the armies of the Northern Front, the Bolsheviks created army Revolutionary Military Committees subordinate to them, which began to seize the command of military units into their own hands. The Bolshevik Military Revolutionary Committee of the 5th Army took control of the army headquarters in Dvinsk and blocked the way for units trying to break through to support the Kerensky–Krasnov offensive. 40 thousand Latvian Riflemen took the side of Lenin, who played an important role in establishing the power of the Bolsheviks throughout Russia. On November 7, the Military Revolutionary Committee of the North–Western Region and the Northern Front was created, which removed the front commander, and on December 3, a congress of representatives of the Western Front opened, which elected Alexander Myasnikov as front commander.

The victory of the Bolsheviks in the troops of the Northern and Western Fronts created the conditions for the liquidation of the Headquarters of the Supreme Commander–in–Chief. The Council of People's Commissars appointed warrant officer Nikolai Krylenko as the supreme commander in chief of the Bolshevik, who on November 20 arrived with a detachment of Red Guards and sailors at Headquarters in the city of Mogilev and, heading the central command and control apparatus, announced the end of hostilities at the front.

On the Southwestern, Romanian and Caucasian fronts, things were different.

The Ukrainian Central Rada, which refused to recognize the legality of the Council of People's Commissars of Soviet Russia, stepped up activities to Ukrainize troops and create its own army, withdrew Ukrainianized units from the Northern and Western Fronts, and also took steps to unilaterally withdraw the troops of the Southwestern and Romanian Fronts of the former Russian Army from – under the control of the Headquarters and their unification into an independent Ukrainian Front of the Active Army of the Ukrainian People's Republic, which was headed by an anti–Bolshevik–minded Colonel–General Dmitry Shcherbachev, the former commander of the Romanian front. On December 9, Shcherbachev signed an armistice agreement between the combined Russian–Romanian and German–Austrian troops, which allowed him to begin suppressing the Bolshevik influence in the army.

On the territory of Right–Bank Ukraine, the Bolshevized units of the 2nd Guards Corps that were leaving the front were opposed by units that had gone over to the side of the Central Rada, first of all, the 1st Ukrainian Corps under the command of General Pavel Skoropadsky. They blocked junction stations, disarmed garrisons and military echelons, dispersed the Soviets, military revolutionary committees and units of the Red Guard.

In the period from December 17 to 24, by order of Petliura and the commander of the Ukrainian Front, General Shcherbachev, troops loyal to the Central Rada captured the headquarters of the Romanian and Southwestern Fronts, armies, up to regiments, arrested members of the Military Revolutionary Committees and Bolshevik commissars, some of them were shot. This was followed by the disarmament by the Romanians of those units in which the influence of the Bolsheviks was strong. Left without weapons and food, Russian soldiers were forced to leave on foot for Russia in the severe frost.

On December 23, 1917, a congress of the Caucasian Army opened in Tiflis, which adopted a resolution recognizing and supporting the Council of People's Commissars and condemning the actions of the Transcaucasian Commissariat. The congress elected the regional Soviet of the Caucasian Army (chairman – the Bolshevik Grigory Korganov).

By order of the Military Revolutionary Committee of the Caucasian Army of December 31, 1917, all military revolutionary committees of units and formations of the front were instructed to "immediately proceed to the systematic withdrawal of a significant part of the troops, leaving the necessary positional barriers to protect warehouses, communications and transport". Echelons of demobilized soldiers were often attacked by local militias, set up by the Transcaucasian Commissariat, seeking to seize weapons and other military equipment. As on other fronts, demobilization commissions were created almost everywhere in the Caucasus, in accordance with the order of the Military Revolutionary Committee of the Caucasian Army of January 2, 1918. On March 7, the Military Revolutionary Committee of the Caucasian Army published a decree on the completion of demobilization on the Caucasian Front.

== See also ==
- All–Russian Constituent Assembly
- Peace of Brest
