= All-Russian Union of Landowners =

The All-Russian Union of Landowners (Russian: Всероссийский союз землевладельцев) was a right-wing party in Russia. The party was founded in 1905 and lobbied the Tsarist government to defend landowners' interests. Its founding conference was held in Moscow on November 17, 1905, gathering 203 landowners from 33 provinces.

The party held its second congress in Moscow in 1906. The Union withered away in 1907 as peasantry unrest declined.
