= 1917 Baku City Duma election =

Local election in Azerbaijan

- 29 October 1917
- All 100 seats in the Baku City Duma; 50 seats needed for a majority
Party	Leader	Vote %	Seats	+/–
SR-Mensheviks	Viktor Chernov	24.10	25	
ARF		16.97	17	
Bolsheviks	Vladimir Lenin	15.40	16	
Musavat	Mahammad Amin Rasulzade	14.08	14	
Ittihad		11.03	11	
Kadets	Pavel Milyukov	5.74	6	
Yedinstvo	Georgi Plekhanov	3.55	3	
APP		3.24	3	
UJEC		3.04	3	
KRDO		2.27	2	
This lists parties that won seats. See the complete results below.

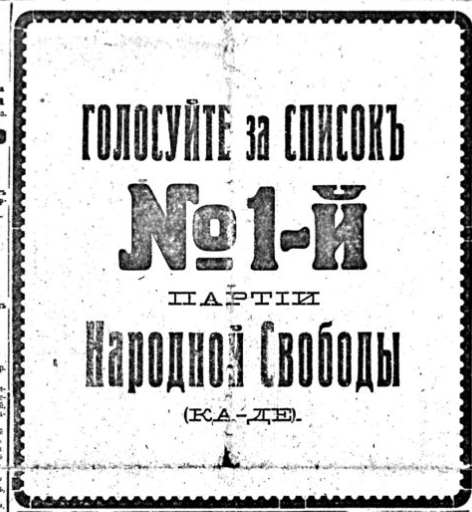
Advert for List 1, the Kadets

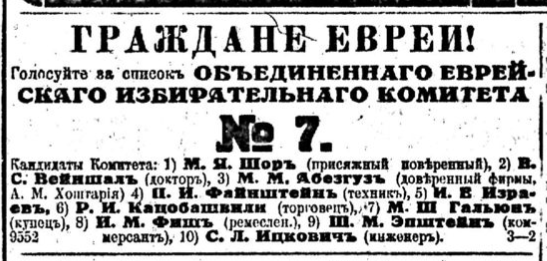
Advert for List 7, the United Jewish Electoral Committee

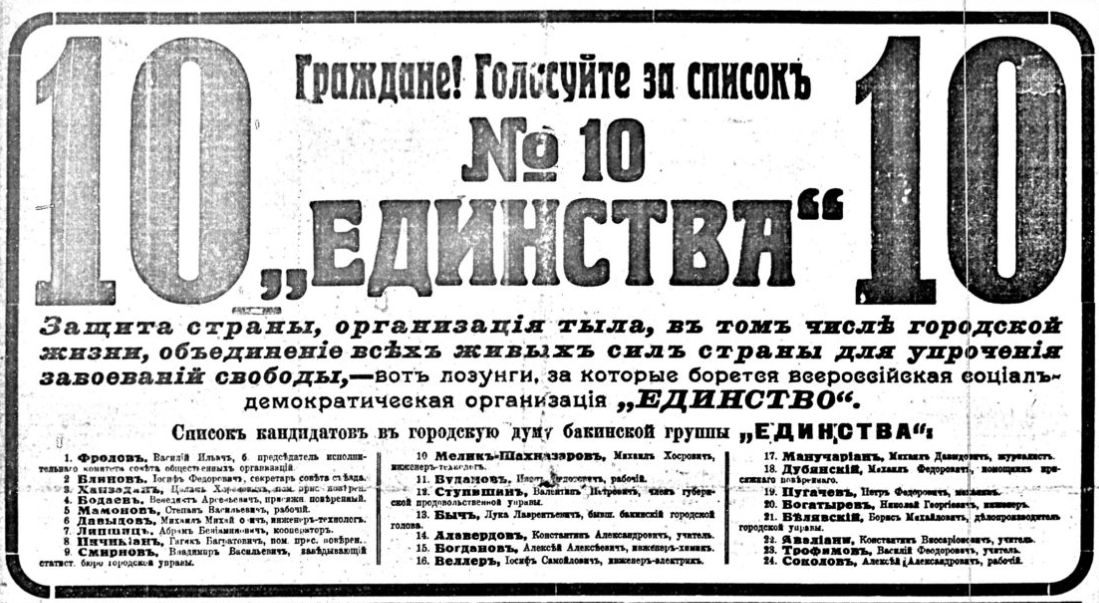
Advert for List 10, Yedinstvo

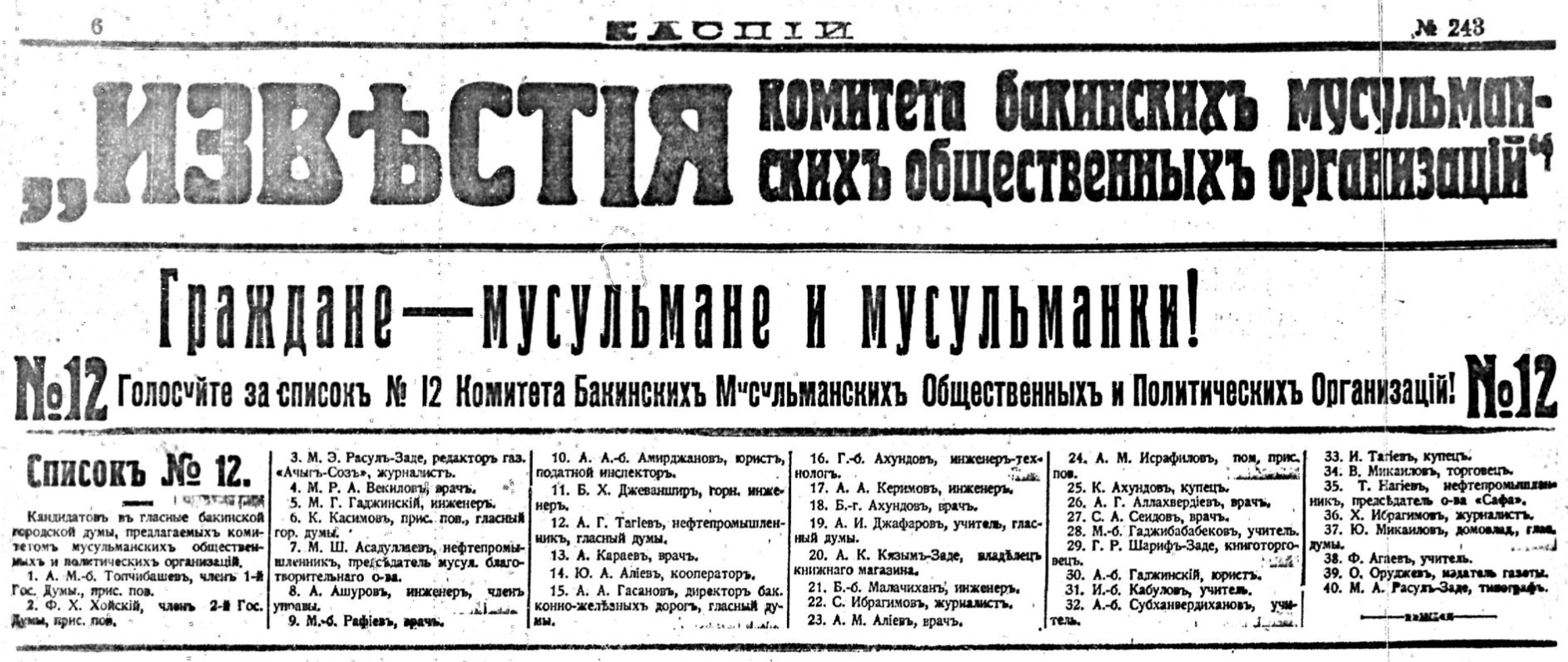
Advert for List 12, the Baku Committee of Muslim Community Organizations (Musavat Party)

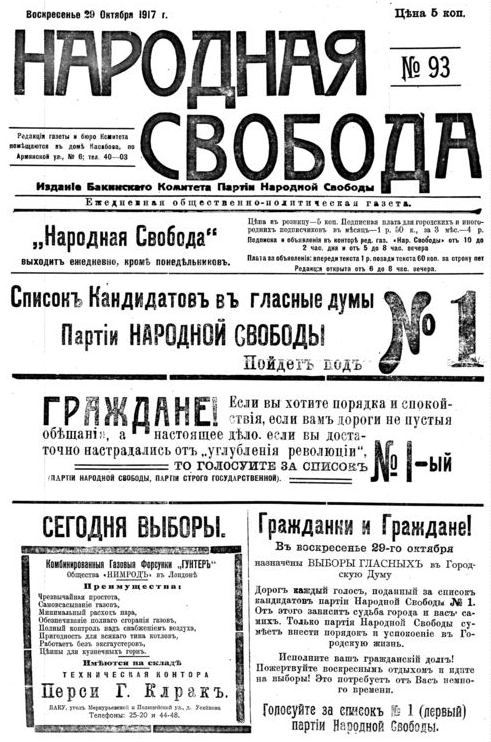
Electoral propaganda bulletin of the People's Freedom Party (Kadets) for the Baku City Duma election

An election to the Baku City Duma was held on 11 November [O.S. 29 October] 1917. Baku was the last major city in Russia to hold local duma elections during 1917. Notably, the vote was held after October Revolution commenced.

On 28 April 1915 the Baku City Duma decided to postpone elections for a new duma until the end of the war. The decision was ratified on 16 January 1916. However, with the overthrow of the czarist rule during the 1917 February Revolution, the issue of local elections re-emerged. Under the Provisional Government regulations were issued for the holding of elections of city dumas on the basis of universal, equal and direct suffrage with secret ballot.

The Socialist-Revolutionaries and Mensheviks formed a strong alliance after July 1917, around the principle of 'revolutionary defencism' and set up a joint list for the city duma election. The Armenian Revolutionary Federation ('Dashnaks') was excluded from alliance.

However, the holding of the city duma election in Baku suffered long delays. In September 1917, OZAKOM ceded to demands for immediate elections to city duma. However, the city boundaries had remained unchanged, thus leaving the industrial districts outside of the city proper. The issue of incorporation of the Baku oilfields into the city proper was a key dispute in the run-up to the election. The incumbent city government, Moslem parties and the Kadets opposed incorporation, with the Moslem parties arguing that the oil fields had closer connection with the surrounding villages. The Baku Soviet called for incorporation, and the Bolsheviks actively campaigned for oil field incorporation.

== Election result ==
Below an account published in the newspaper Kaspii on 1 November 1917;

List	Votes	%	Seats
List 4 - Socialist Bloc (Socialist-Revolutionaries, Mensheviks)	17,519	24.10%	25
List 2 - Armenian Revolutionary Federation	12,331	16.97%	17
List 5 - Bolsheviks	11,195	15.40%	16
List 12 - Muslim Community Organizations (Musavat)	10,234	14.08%	14
List 9 - "Muslims of Russia" (Ittihad)	8,015	11.03%	11
List 1 - People's Freedom Party (Kadets)	4,172	5.74%	5 or 6
List 10 - Yedinstvo	2,581	3.55%	3
List 11 - Armenian National Democrats	2,357	3.24%	3
List 7 - United Jewish Electoral Committee	2,208	3.04%	3
List 8 - Caucasus Russian Democratic Society	1,647	2.27%	2
List 3 - Government Employees	237	0.33%	0
List 6 - Jewish Socialists	185	0.25%	0
Total	72,681		

The following, slightly different account, is present by Rosenberg (1969);

List	Baku Popular Vote		Garrison Vote		Seats
List	Votes	% of votes	Votes	% of votes	Seats
Socialist Bloc (Socialist-Revolutionaries, Mensheviks)	17,523	24.06%	277	8.96%	25
Armenian Revolutionary Federation	12,332	16.93%	72	2.33%	18
Bolsheviks	11,202	15.38%	2,675	86.49%	16
Musavat	10,285	14.12%	3	0.10%	15
Moslem Clericals	8,063	11.07%	0	0%	12
Kadets	4,173	5.73%	25	0.81%	6
Yedinstvo	2,581	3.54%	6	0.19%	4
Armenian Democrats	2,358	3.24%	2	0.06%	4
Jewish Parties	2,419	3.32%	26	0.84%	3
Russians	1,647	1.16%	2	0.06%	2
Government Employees	245	0.34%	5	0.16%	0
Total	72,828		3,093		105

Rosenberg (1969) uses two sources for the Baku City Duma election result, the newspaper Baku (1 November 1917 issue) and Revolyutsiya 1917 goda v Azerbaydzhane: khronika sobytiy (Baku, 1927). He notes slight discrepancies between the results presented by the two sources. Notably the 1 December 1917 issue of Kaspii presented an account of the electoral result similar to that of Rosenberg.

== Ethnicity of elected deputies ==
Armenians	38
Moslems	31
Russians	19
Jews	12
Polish	3
Georgians	2

== Formation of coalition government ==
After the election, the various political parties diverged on how to form a government for the city. The Mensheviks called for a government including all revolutionary and democratic forces. The Socialist-Revolutionaries argued in favour of a coalition between the city duma and the Baku soviet. The Armenian Revolutionary Federation, Musavat and Ittihad envisioned a coalition of city duma, Baku soviet, national councils and other democratic organizations. The Kadets, Yedinstvo and the incumbent city board argued for exclusive authority of the city duma. A meeting was held on 15 December 1917, and after a first divided vote and a series of negotiations, the Mensheviks moved to support a resolution for the formation of a coalition of the city duma, Baku soviet, Peasants Union, national councils and others. The broad coalition proposal received 47 votes whilst the proposal for a duma-soviet coalition received 24 votes. The coalition government was formed with the support of all parties except the Bolsheviks. The coalition government had 9 members - 3 from soviets (workers, peasants, soldiers), 3 from national organizations (Moslem, Armenian, Russian) and 3 from the city duma and its board.

== See also ==
- 1917 Astrakhan City Duma election
- 1917 Russian municipal elections
- November 1917 Yekaterinburg City Duma election
- 1917 Kiev City Duma election
- 1917 Minsk City Duma election
- 1917 Odessa City Duma election
