= Astrakhan electoral district =

Constituency of the Russian Republic

Astrakhan
- Former Civilian constituency for the All-Russian Constituent Assembly
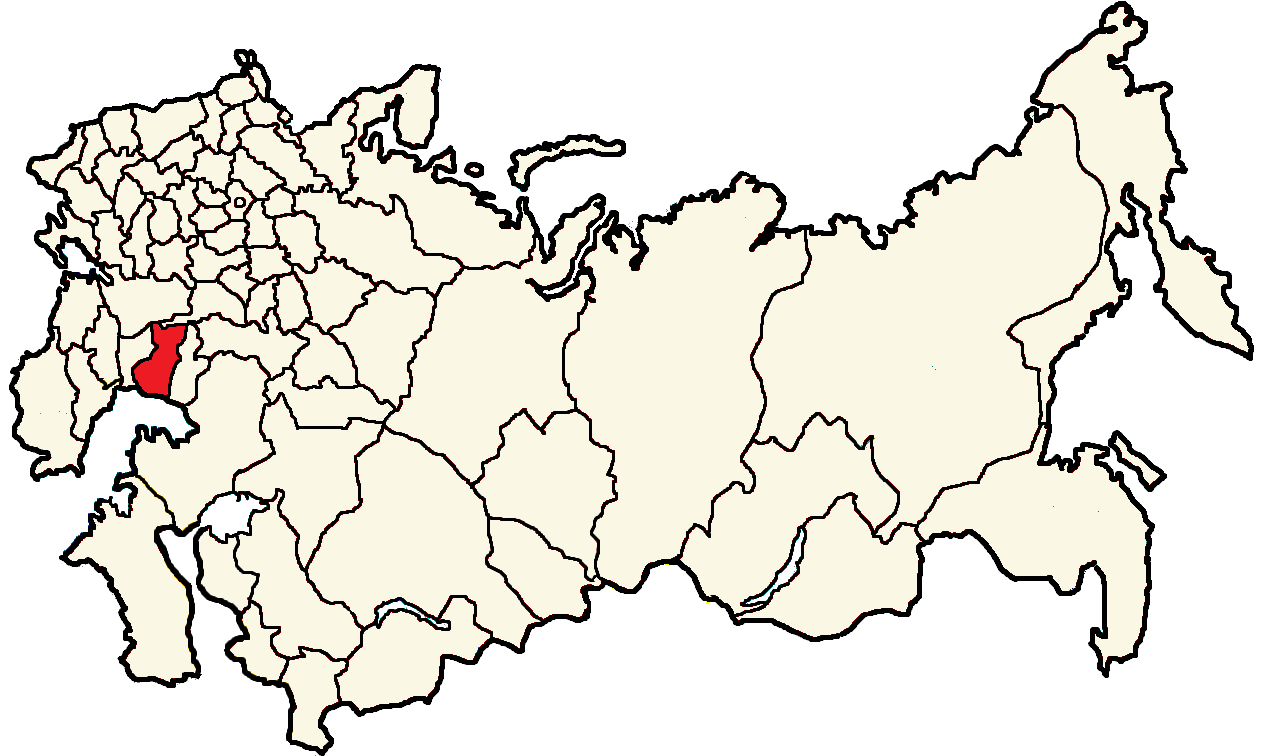

Former constituency
- Created: 1917
- Abolished: 1918
- Number of members: 5
- Number of Uyezd Electoral Commissions: 5
- Number of Urban Electoral Commissions: 1
- Number of Parishes: 49

The Astrakhan electoral district (Russian: Астраханский избирательный округ) was a constituency created for the 1917 Russian Constituent Assembly election. The electoral district covered parts of the Astrakhan Governorate, excluding the areas of the Bukey Horde and the Kalmyk Steppe.

== Results ==
Astrakhan
Party	Vote	%
List 6 - Socialist-Revolutionaries	100,482	51.77
List 4 - Bolsheviks	36,023	18.56
List 2 - Muslim Group	25,023	12.89
List 3 - Cossack Group	16,400	8.45
List 1 - Kadets	13,017	6.71
List 5 - Mensheviks	2,256	1.16
List 7 - Popular Socialist Group of Tsarevsky Uezd	906	0.47
Total:	194,107	

Deputies Elected
Usmanov	Muslim
Tereshchenko	SR
Trusov	Bolshevik
Figner	SR
Nezhintsev	SR

The account of U.S. historian Oliver Henry Radkey (used for the table above) is incomplete, with some votes missing. In Astrakhan town, the Bolsheviks got 9,556 votes (27.5%), the Kadets 8,981 votes (25.8%), the Muslim list 6,376 votes (18.3%), the SRs 4,310 votes (12.4%), the Cossack list 3,900 votes (11.2%), the Mensheviks 1,486 votes (4.3%) and the Popular Socialists 191 votes (0.5%). The Bolsheviks won 53.4% of the votes in the Astrakhan garrison.
