= 1917 Odessa City Duma election =

Municipal election in Odesa, 1917

An election to the Odessa City Duma was held on August 19 [O.S. August 6] 1917. The election was part of a series of municipal elections across Russia that took place between the February and October revolutions of 1917. The Socialist-Revolutionary Party won a landslide victory in Odessa. The Odessa City Duma continued to play an important role until the end of 1917.

== Background ==
In the wake of the February Revolution rumours of a counter-revolutionary plot in Odessa emerged. On 4 March 1917 mayor Boris Aleksandrovich Pelikan issued a public call for 'peace and order' in the city. Around 7–8 March 1917 mayor Pelikan, deputy mayor L. Mechnikov, city board member Albrand, police chief Hirschfeld, the prison chief Pereshin and nine other individuals were arrested. Colonel V.I. Yesaulov took charge as acting mayor, and together with democratic forces set up the Odessa Public Committee - which was authorized by the Russian Provisional Government to run the affairs of urban governance of Odessa. The Public Committee gathered many different political tendencies - the liberal faction of the old City Duma, the City Union, the Zemstvo Union, the Military Industrial Committee, the Committee for the Establishment of the Soviet of Workers Deputies, the Committee of the Romanian Front, the (Ukrainian) Odessa Steering Committee (represented by Sergey Shelukhin and Ivan Lutsenko), the University Council, societies of industrialists of the South of Russia, as well as representatives of political parties (Kadets, Socialist-Revolutionaries, Mensheviks, General Jewish Labour Bund and others).

== Preparations for local elections ==
On 16 April 1917 the new regulations for municipal elections were issued by the Provisional Government. The new regulations abolished the property and taxation requirements for voting. For the first time, suffrage was equal between men and women. Voting age was set at 20 years. Military servicemen were eligible to vote in local elections at sites of deployment. The Provisional Government fixed the size of the new Odessa City Duma to be elected at 120 seats.

The special election commission for the City Duma vote included new city mayor Mikhail Braikevich, the city statistician Anton Borynevich and representatives of the Soviet of Workers, Soldiers, Officers and Peasants Deputies. The election commission ordered that 56 polling stations be set up across the city, and that polling stations would be open between 09.00 am and 09.00 pm on the day of the vote. 315,502 residents of Odessa were eligible to cast their votes.

== Candidatures and campaigning ==
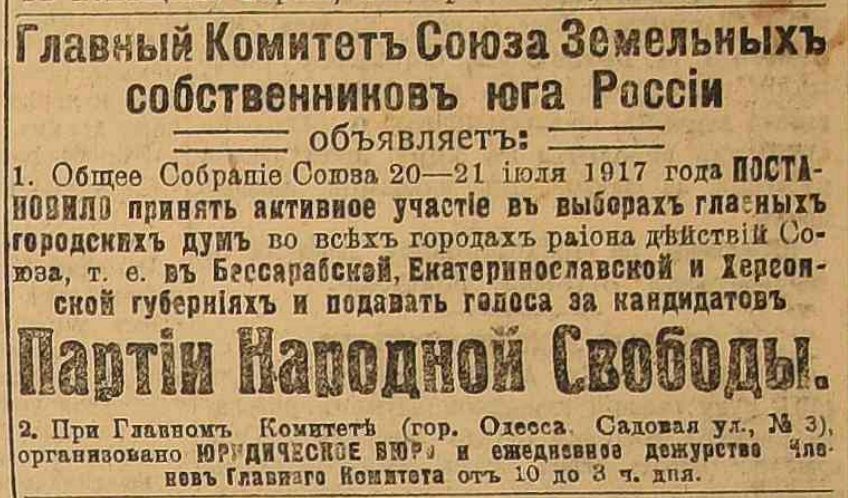
Announcement of the Union of Land Owners of South Russia calling for a vote for the People's Freedom Party (i.e. Kadets), published on front page of Odesskie Novosti

A total of twenty-four candidate lists contested the election. The outcome of the Moscow City Duma election emboldened the SRs, and they opted to run for the Odessa City Duma without any alliance with moderate groups. The Menshevik and the General Jewish Labour Bund fielded a joint list. Likewise, the Ukrainian Party of Socialist-Revolutionaries and the Ukrainian Social Democratic Labour Party contested jointly on the 'Ukrainian List' (List No. 2).

The election campaign took place in a heated political climate. The Kadets, whom the SRs had flagged as 'bourgeois', had several of their campaign offices vandalized. The Ukrainian List raised the slogan "Vote for us to anger the bourgeoisie!". The Bolsheviks on their hand raised the slogan "We demand a truce on all fronts!"

In June 1917 the Polish Workers' Union in Odessa split into two groups - the Polish Socialist Workers Union (linked to the Polish Socialist Party – Left) and the Polish National Socialist Workers' Union "Spójnia" (linked to the Polish Socialist Party – Revolutionary Faction). The latter group boycotted the election in Odessa, arguing that the Poles were citizens of neutral Poland and not Russia.

The Union of Land Owners decided to call for support to the Kadet list.

== Results ==
The list of the Socialist-Revolutionary Party, List No. 19, received the highest number of votes. 60% of adult population of Odessa participated. List 19 (SR) got some 105,000 votes. The Kadets mustered some 26,000 votes Kadets, some 23,000 votes for Jewish Bloc, some 13,000 votes for the Menshevik-Bund list, some 7,000 votes for the Ukrainian List and some 4,500 votes for the Bolsheviks.

However, slightly different accounts on the seat distribution exist. Per Guthier (1990) Russian socialists won 77 seats, Kadets 15 seats, Jewish parties 14 seats, Ukrainian parties 5 seats and other parties 9 seats. Per Vintskovs'kyi (2015), the new City Duma had 68 seats were won by the SRs, 15 for the Kadets (and a similar number of seats for the Jewish Bloc, who finished in third place), 7 for the Mensheviks, 5 for the Ukrainian Bloc, 4 Bolsheviks and 2 Monarchists. Per Feitelberg-Blank (2008) the SRs won 65 seats.

The newly elected City Duma differed markedly from its predecessor. None of the City Duma members elected in 1913 managed to get re-elected. About two thirds of the newly elected City Duma belonged to the intelligentsia. The share of Jewish deputies in the City Duma increased significantly. And for the first time, women were elected to the City Duma – one Kadet (listed on third place on the Kadet list) and one SR (listed on the 56th place on the SR list).

The five deputies elected from the Ukrainian List were Vsevolod Holubovych, Volodymyr Chekhivsky, Mikhailo Gordievsky, M. Kravchenko and G. Osmolovsky.

== August 23 meeting ==
The first meeting of the newly elected municipality took place on 23 August 1917. The Kadet mayor Braikevich held an inaugural speech on behalf of the Public Committee He addressed a welcoming speech on behalf of the Public Committee and the City Soviet. The 23 August 1917 meeting elected a new city board, consisting of Ivan Lordkipanidze (SR), Vsevolod Holubovych (Ukrainian SR), B. Kondratiev (Kadet), Grigory Lurie (Bund), E. Zakharzhevsky (Polish Socialist Workers Union) and M. Mishkin (United Jewish Socialist Workers Party). Vasily Sukhomlin was elected as the city new mayor. He was a well-known publicist, engineer, narodnik, and had been jailed in the German Lopatin case. He had joined the SR party in 1917. B.Y. Friedman and Solomon Lazarovich were elected deputy mayors.

On 26 August 1917 the Public Committee dissolved itself and handed over power to the City Duma.

== See also ==
- 1917 Astrakhan City Duma election
- 1917 Baku City Duma election
- November 1917 Yekaterinburg City Duma election
- 1917 Kiev City Duma election
- 1917 Minsk City Duma election
- 1917 Russian municipal elections
