= Battle of Tsaritsyn =

Part of the Southern Front of the Russian Civil War

- Part of the Southern Front of the Russian Civil War
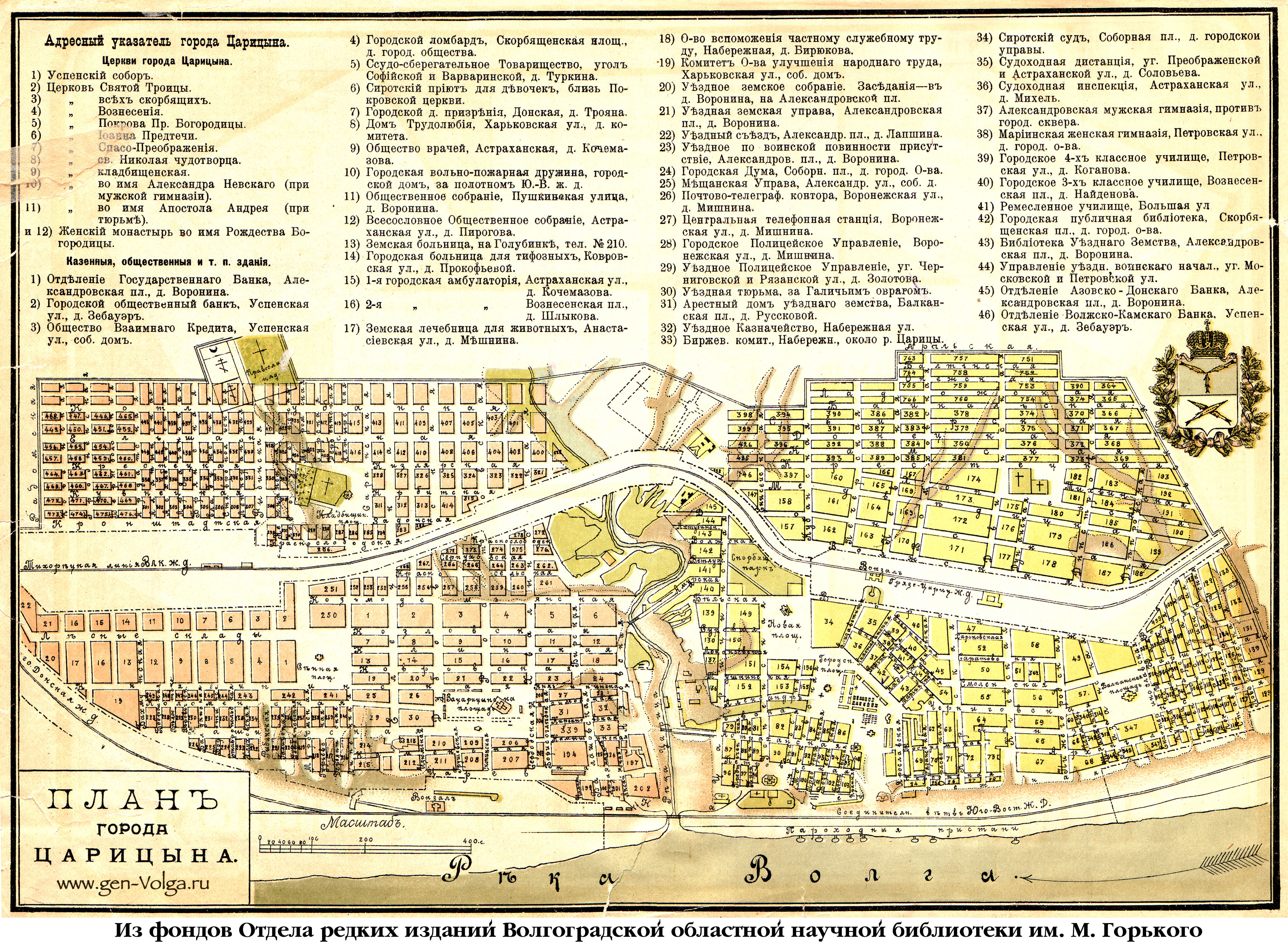
- A 1913 map of Tsaritsyn
Date	July 1918 – January 1920 (1 year and 6 months)
Location	Tsaritsyn, Volga Region 48°42′N 44°31′E
Result	White victory in 1919; Bolshevik victory in 1920; White Army captures city in June 1919; Red Army recaptures city in January 1920

Belligerents
White movement: Don Republic; Kuban Republic; South Russia; Supported by: United Kingdom	Bolsheviks: (Russian Soviet Federative Socialist Republic) Russian SFSR; (Ukrainian Soviet Socialist Republic) Ukrainian SSR

Commanders and leaders
Pyotr Krasnov; Anton Denikin; Pyotr Wrangel	Joseph Stalin; Kliment Voroshilov; Andrei Snesarev; Dmitry Zhloba; Pavel Sytin; Grigory Kulik

Units involved
Armed Forces of South Russia: Don Army; Caucasus Army; Volunteer Army	Southern Front: 10th Army

Strength
c. 50,000	c. 117,000

The Battle of Tsaritsyn was a military confrontation between the Red Army and the White Army during the Russian Civil War for control of Tsaritsyn (now Volgograd), a significant city and port on the Volga River in southwestern Russia.

The city, which had been an important center of support for the October Revolution and remained in the hands of the Reds, was besieged three times by anti-Bolshevik Don Cossacks under the command of Pyotr Krasnov: July–September 1918, September–October 1918, and January–February 1919. Another attempt to conquer Tsaritsyn was made in May–June 1919 by the Volunteer Army, which successfully captured the city. In turn, between August 1919 and January 1920, the Whites defended the city against the Bolsheviks. Tsaritsyn was finally conquered by the Reds in early 1920.

The defense of Tsaritsyn, nicknamed the "Red Verdun", was one of the most widely described and commemorated events of the Civil War in Soviet historiography, art and propaganda. This was because Joseph Stalin took part in the defense of the city between July 1918 and January 1920.

== Background ==
During the Russian Revolution, the heavily industrialized city of Tsaritsyn became a powerful revolutionary center. The city, situated on the lower Volga, was of strategic importance for the Bolsheviks. It was through Tsaritsyn that the supplies of food and oil from Baku reached Moscow, and the railroad running through the city provided the Council of People's Commissars with supporters from Central Asia. The city also played host to large ammunition factories.

In May 1918, the Don Soviet Republic collapsed and the anti-communist Don Republic was established in the region. Over the following months, the strategic importance of Tsaritsyn grew even more: by controlling the city, the Reds not only prevented the counter-revolutionary forces of the Don, Ural and Orenburg Cossacks from joining together, but also gave them the opportunity to redeploy forces from the north towards White-held areas in Kuban and the North Caucasus. Tsaritsyn also protected Saratov, another significant center controlled by the Bolsheviks.

In June 1918, the Southern Front of the Red Army was brought under the command of Kliment Voroshilov, a revolutionary from Donbas. He began to assemble an army to defend Tsaritsyn, consisting of local troops and formations that had managed to retreat to the city from the Don and Donbas. That same month, Joseph Stalin arrived in the city and quickly joined the command of the local forces, despite having initially been sent to obtain grain for Moscow. Together, Voroshilov and Stalin established the North Caucasus Military District in order to rally the defense of the city and centralise control over all Red forces in the region. The army that Voroshilov assembled eventually became the 10th Army of the Southern Front.

Meanwhile, ataman Pyotr Krasnov convinced the Don krug to occupy the cities bordering the Don Republic, including Tsaritsyn, Kamyshin, Balashov, Povorino, Novokhopyorsk, Kalach, and Boguchar.

== First siege (July–September 1918) ==
From May to July 1918, the Don Cossacks under the command of Pyotr Krasnov were able to mobilize 40,000 men, equal in size but better trained than the Red troops present in the region. By the end of July, the Cossacks had cut the railway line towards Tsaritsyn and the Volunteer Army had seized a number of towns en route to the city, completely surrounding the Red forces in Tsaritsyn.

The Don Cossacks launched their first attack on Tsaritsyn in late August 1918, but this offensive was repulsed by mid-September. The Bolsheviks, in turn, organized a counter-offensive along the three railway lines leaving the city. Although initially successful, the counter-offensive was halted after two weeks, when the Whites received reinforcements from Voronezh. The possibility of an offensive against Voronezh would pose a greater threat to the Soviet government in Moscow than the potential collapse of Tsaritsyn.

== Second siege (September–October 1918) ==
Towards the end of September, as part of a broader reorganization of the entire Red Army, coordinated by its commander-in-chief Jukums Vācietis and the military commissar Leon Trotsky, the Red forces in Tsaritsyn were officially renamed the 10th Army. It was still commanded by Voroshilov, but the Bolsheviks reorganized the entire Southern Front, putting at its head the former Tsarist general Pavel Sytin.

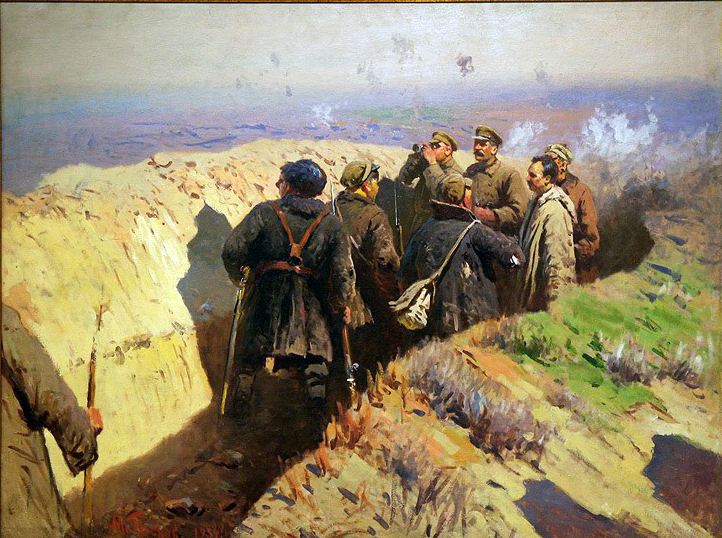
Mitrofan Grekov's painting of Joseph Stalin, Kliment Voroshilov and Efim Shchadenko in the trenches of Tsaritsyn

At this same time, a second Cossack offensive began under the general command of Pyotr Krasnov, and with the participation of a group of 50,000 cavalry under the command of Konstantin Mamontov. By mid-October the city was almost completely surrounded and the only advantage the Reds had was in artillery, which allowed them to keep control over the city. A conflict immediately broke out in Tsaritsyn between Stalin and Voroshilov on the one hand, and Trotsky, Vācietis and Sytin on the other.

Stalin interfered with matters beyond his competence and urged Voroshilov to ignore Sytin's orders. When on 29 September 1918 Sytin arrived in Tsaritsyn from his headquarters in Kozlov, a brawl broke out at a meeting of the North Caucasus Military Council, and two days later, against the will of the high command, Voroshilov was appointed commander of the Front. Trotsky and Vācietis demanded that Stalin be deprived of his post as commissar and that Voroshilov be brought before a military tribunal. In response, Stalin sent telegrams to Vladimir Lenin complaining about Trotsky.

Against the orders of the Red Army command, Dmitry Zhloba's 15,000-strong Steel Division (then part of Ivan Sorokin's 11th Army) marched from the North Caucasus towards Tsaritsyn. On 15 October, Zhloba's division struck Krasnov's forces in a surprise attack, breaking the siege. After these events, Zhloba's division was incorporated into the 10th Army. By the end of the month, the Cossacks were forced to resign.

Over the course of the battle, Stalin had regularly disobeyed Moscow's orders, illegally confiscating supplies sent from Moscow through Tsaritsyn towards the Caucasus. In November 1918, Stalin was recalled from Tsaritsyn due to his insubordination and left the city after the siege was lifted. A little later Sytin lost his own position, and Pēteris Slavens was appointed in his place.

== Third siege (December 1918 – February 1919) ==
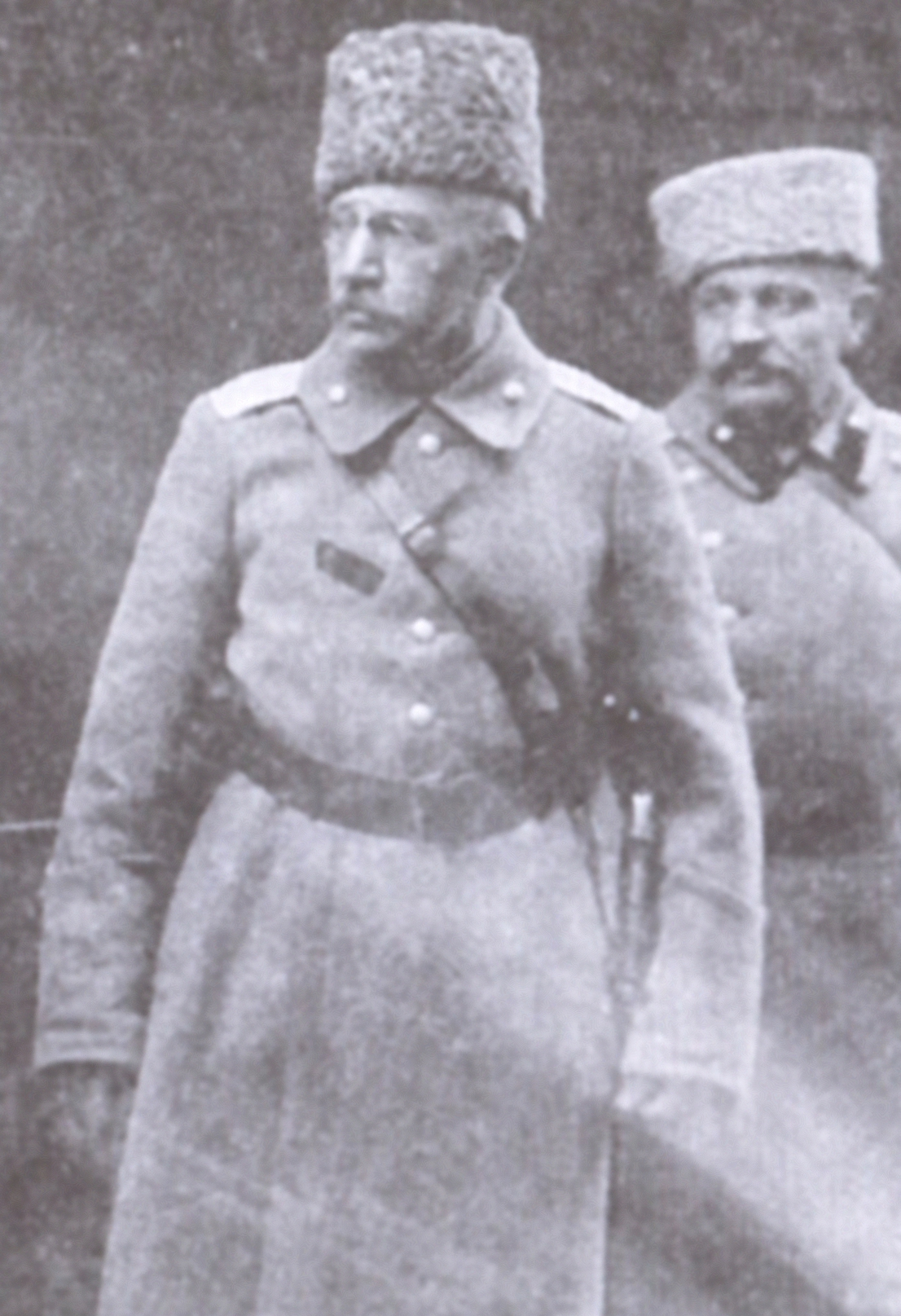
Pyotr Krasnov, commander of the Don Army, at the front.

Krasnov was now largely unable to convince the Cossacks to fight outside the Don region, but with difficulty persuaded them to lead troops to the cities located on the outskirts of the Don. The civilian Cossack leaders and their mid-level military commanders, and even Krasnov's closest associates, were not interested in the situation on other fronts of the civil war. While the Bolsheviks directed the best forces at their disposal to Tsaritsyn, understanding the importance of this center, the Cossacks were primarily concerned with conquering the northern part of the Don region, which was not so important in the broader context of the war.

Krasnov therefore tried to convince the commanders of the Volunteer Army, generals Anton Denikin and Mikhail Alekseev, to coordinate an attack on the city. However, they did not consider its occupation to be a priority either. Denikin was aware of the fact that the Cossacks were only interested in mastering a specific area, and that they would not want to fight the Bolsheviks outside of it. The Volunteer Army headed in the opposite direction, deep into Kuban, capturing it in late 1918.

By the end of November 1918, thanks to the reorganization and growing numerical superiority of the Red Army, the Soviets gained an advantage over the forces of Krasnov. Nevertheless, in December 1918 the Cossacks managed to surround Tsaritsyn again. In January 1919, battles around the city were fought again with varying outcomes. Thanks to the shifting of forces from the north, the numerical advantage of the Reds was constantly growing, and the morale of the White Cossacks was falling, with some of them going over to the side of the Bolsheviks or abandoning the army entirely. At the beginning of 1919, the Red Southern Front numbered 117,000 soldiers, 2,040 machine guns and 460 cannons, which was one fourth of the entire Red Army. On the other side, Krasnov still commanded a force of 50,000 soldiers in November 1918, but in February 1919 only 15,000 Cossacks remained with him.

On 26 December 1918, Voroshilov was replaced as commander of the 10th Army by Alexander Yegorov, a former tsarist officer. and one of the most talented Red commanders during the civil war. At the end of January 1919, the position of commander of the Southern Front was taken by Vladimir Gittis. Under his command, until the end of April this year, the forces of the Southern Front (mainly the 8th, 9th and 13th Red Armies and the 2nd Ukrainian Soviet Army) carried out an offensive that ended with a rebound at Rostov and reaching the line between the Sal and Manych, with the prospect of marching on towards Bataysk and Tikhoretsk.

After the departure of the Austro-Hungarian Army from Ukraine and attacks by the Red forces, the defeats of the Don Cossacks near Tsaritsyn forced them to subordinate to the command of the Volunteer Army. On 19 February 1919, Pyotr Krasnov took command, handing it over to Afrikan Bogaewsky and agreeing that the Don, Terek and Kuban Cossacks would join with the Volunteer Army to become part of the Armed Forces of South Russia.

== Whites capture Tsaritsyn (June 1919) ==
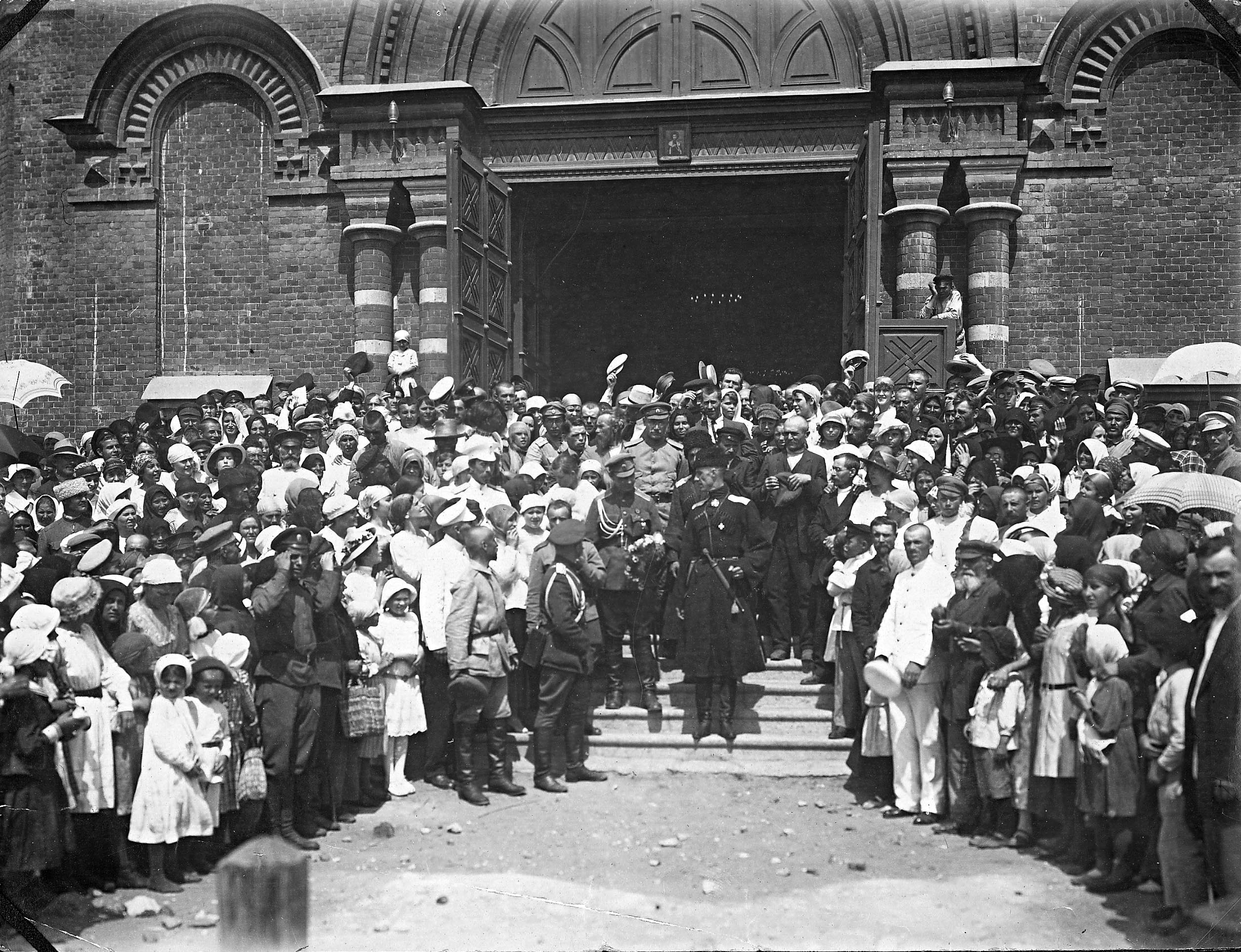
Pyotr Wrangel heads the victory parade at Alexander Nevsky Cathedral, after the White capture of the city 30 June 1919.

By the summer of 1919, supplies of arms and ammunition delivered to the Whites in Novorossiysk by the Allies bolstered White military power, while another Cossack uprising had broken out on the Don in response to the De-Cossackization campaign. Red army commanders on the Southern Front, apart from Mikhail Tukhachevsky and Alexander Yegorov, turned out to be incompetent.

In May–June 1919, the Whites won a series of victories in eastern Ukraine, displacing the Soviet forces from the Ukrainian Soviet capital of Kharkiv and then capturing Donbas, after several months of fighting. In May, Yegorov's 10th Army retreated in disarray towards the east, while in mid-June the Kuban Cossacks under the command of Pyotr Wrangel carried out a cavalry assault on Tsaritsyn, which was repulsed.

However, the renovation of the railway from Kuban to Tsaritsyn allowed the Whites to transport tanks, delivered by the British. On 30 June 1919, Wrangel's forces entered the city, taking 40,000 red prisoners and seizing supplies and ammunition cars. On 3 July 1919, at the victory parade of Wrangel's forces in Tsaritsyn, Denikin announced the beginning of the White advance on Moscow before the Icon of Our Lady of Kazan.

== The Reds recapture Tsaritsyn (August 1919 – January 1920) ==
As part of the White campaign to capture Moscow, the Caucasian Army, led by Wrangel, marched out of Tsaritsyn, passed through Kamyshin (also in White hands), and in early August was approaching Saratov. However, the lack of reserves and supplies and insufficient support from the Kuban Cossacks forced Wrangel to withdraw to Tsaritsyn.

In August, the Red Army command entrusted the task of recapturing the city to a strike group under Vasily Shorin. Wrangel retreated to the outskirts of Tsaritsyn, where he successfully defended himself against Shorin's forces, inflicting heavy losses on them. After six weeks of fighting, they were only able to passively defend. Shorin's intention to regroup and continue his march on Tsaritsyn was finally thwarted by Konstantin Mamontov's unexpected cavalry raid into the rear of the Red Army, to which Shorin had to direct some of his troops.

On 3 January 1920, Tsaritsyn was definitively retaken by the Southwestern Front of the Red Army.

== Repressions ==
During the battle, the locally-created Cheka carried out a ruthless repression campaign targeting those deemed to be bourgeoisie, clergy, intelligentsia or tsarist officers, many of whom had answered a local appeal to join the Red Army. Those who questioned the policy were also suppressed. Stalin, having been granted military powers in the city, proceeded to arrest the current Red Army general Andrei Snesarev and other tsarist officers and specialists who were already serving in the Red Army and had them detained on a barge on the Volga River. The eventual fate of the prisoners was starvation or execution except for Snesarev, who was freed on Trotsky's orders and reassigned elsewhere.

Stalin had also intrigued to confiscate from his colleagues K.E. Makhrovsky, who had been sent by Lenin to obtain fuel, money, fuel, train and had his transport commissariat, N.P. Alekseev, shot along with his two sons without a trial in connection with an alleged plot.

The executions and the alleged plots were broadcast in newspapers in an attempt to galvanize the public. That may have been the first instance revealing the future leader's proclivity to unveiling numerous plots and conspiracies and entangling the victims into fabricated and publicized trials for agitation purposes. According to Anatoly Nosovich, a Red Army defector, Stalin "frequently remarked in arguments over the military arts [...] if the most talented commander in the world lacked politically conscious soldiers properly prepared by agitation, then, believe me, he would not be able to do anything against revolutionaries who were small in number but highly motivated."

The local Soviet attempted to investigate the ongoing arrests and executions but was told off by the local Cheka.

== Legacy ==
Due to Joseph Stalin's participation in the defense of Tsaritsyn, the battles for the city were among the events of the civil war most widely portrayed in Soviet historiography and propaganda. In 1925, the name of the city was even changed to "Stalingrad".

A little over two decades later the city would once again be a battlefield, this time for the decisive battle of the Eastern Front of World War II: the Battle of Stalingrad. In 1961, the city was renamed Volgograd by Nikita Khrushchev during his de-Stalinization campaign.

In 1937, the battles for Tsaritsyn acted as the background for Alekey Tolstoy's novel Bread. In 1942, the Vasilyev brothers dramatized the events in a two-part film The Defense of Tsaritsyn.

== Gallery ==
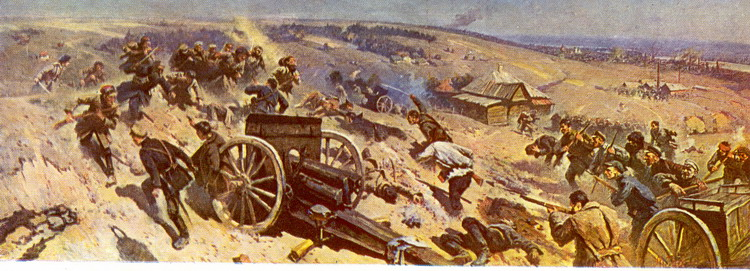
Mitrofan Grekov's painting of an attack in Tsaritsyn

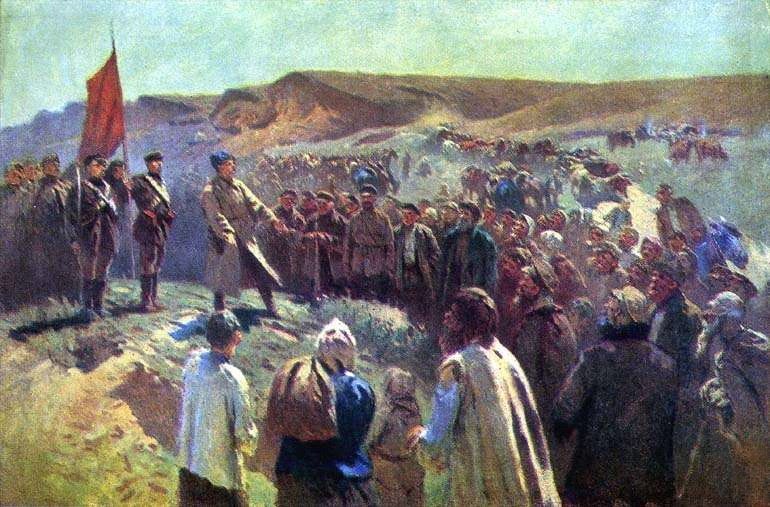
Painting of the Red Army on their way to Tsaritsyn

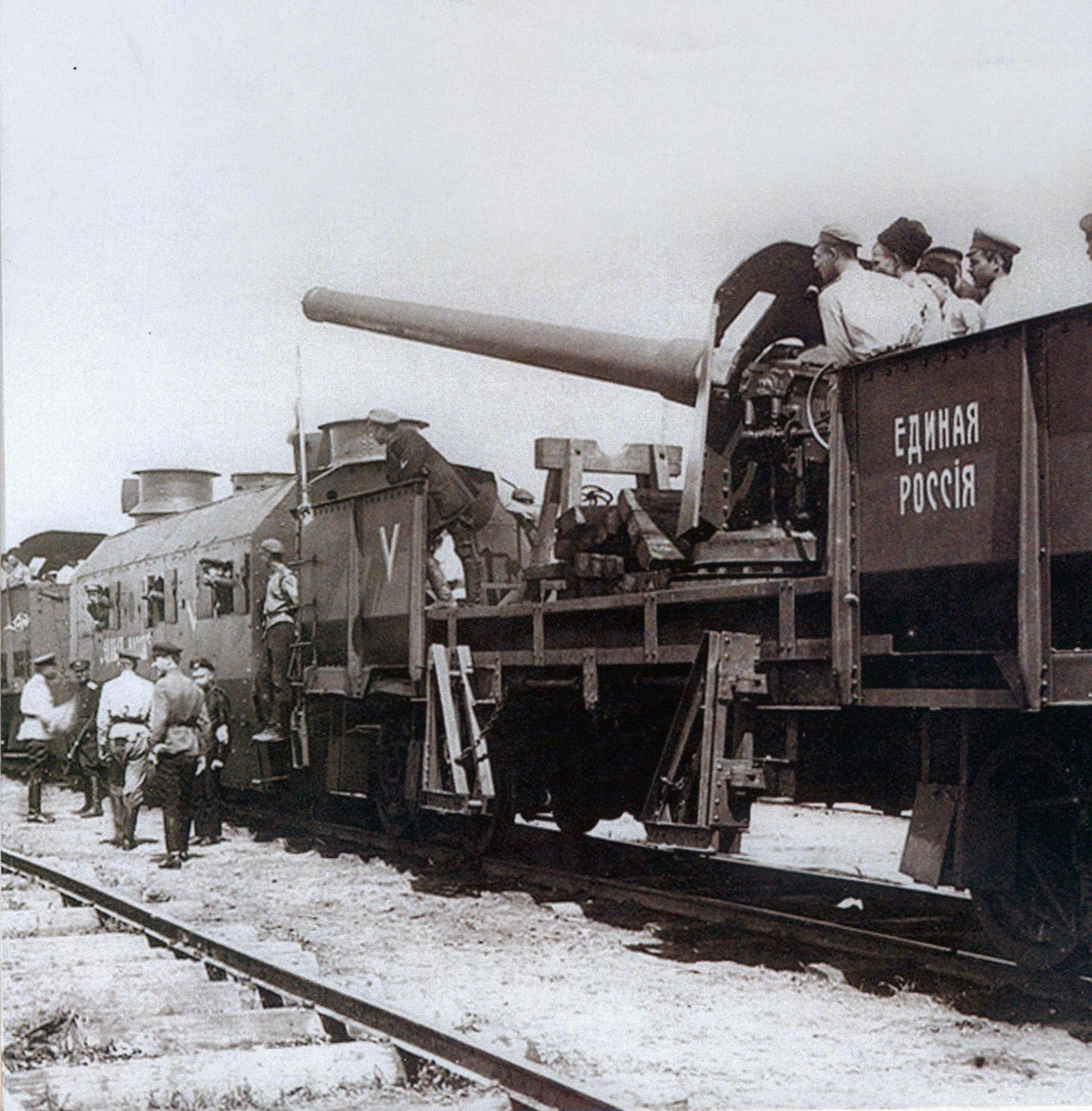
White Army armoured train "United Russia" on its way towards the city, June 1919

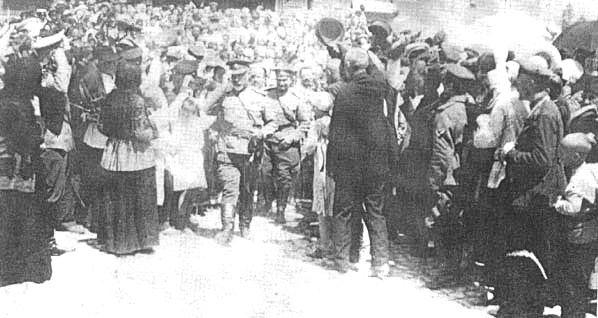
Local citizens welcome Denikin and officers to the city on 1 July 1919

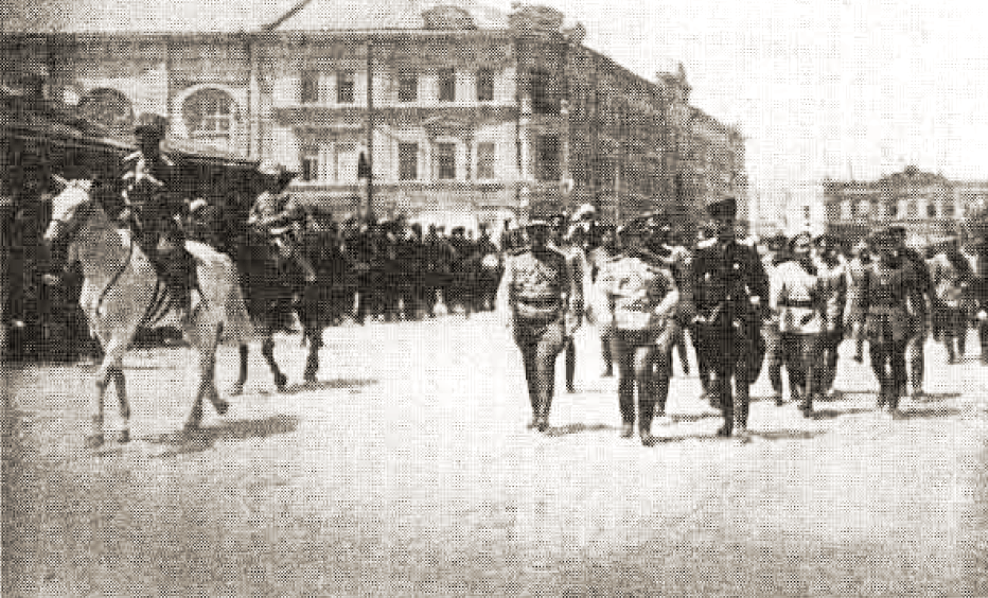
Denikin and Wrangel during a Tsaritsyn parade with Armed Forces of South Russia in July 1919

== See also ==
- Bibliography of the Russian Revolution and Civil War
- Outline of the Russian Revolution and Civil War
- Index of articles related to the Russian Revolution and Civil War
- The "Russian" Civil Wars, 1916–1926: Ten Years That Shook the World
- Russia in Flames: War, Revolution, Civil War, 1914–1921
- Russia in Revolution: An Empire in Crisis, 1890 to 1928
- Russia: Revolution and Civil War, 1917—1921
- The Russian Revolution: A New History

== Bibliography ==
- Adams, Arthur (1963). Bolsheviks in the Ukraine. The Second Campaign, 1918-1919. New Haven: Yale University Press. OCLC 406299.
- Kenez, Peter (2004a). Red Attack, White Resistance; Civil War in South Russia 1918. Washington, DC: New Academia Publishing. ISBN 9780974493442. OCLC 1263743648.
- Kenez, Peter (2004b). Red Advance, White Defeat. Civil War in South Russia 1919-1920. Washington DC: New Academia Publishing. ISBN 0974493457.
- Kotkin, Stephen (2014). Stalin: Paradoxes of Power. New York: Penguin Press. ISBN 9780713999440. OCLC 931787116.
- Mawdsley, Evan (2010). Wojna domowa w Rosji 1917–1920 (in Polish). Translated by Monika Popławska. Warsaw: Bellona. ISBN 978-83-11-11638-2. OCLC 750846354.
- Overy, Richard J. (1996). Why the Allies Won. London. ISBN 9780712674539. OCLC 469081559.
- Smele, J. D. (2015). The "Russian" Civil Wars 1916-1926. Ten Years That Shook the World. London: C. Hurst & Co. ISBN 9781849047210.
- Wright, Damien (2017). Churchill's Secret War with Lenin: British and Commonwealth Military Intervention in the Russian Civil War, 1918-20. Solihull: Helion. ISBN 9781911512103. OCLC 1023368302.
