= Nemetsky District =

Nemetsky District (lit. German district) may refer to:

- Nemetsky National District, a district of Altai Krai, Russia
- Azovsky Nemetsky National District, a district of Omsk Oblast, Russia
- German Quarter (Nemetskaya sloboda), a historical neighborhood in Moscow, Russia
