= Degtyarka =

Degtyarka Дегтярка
- Selo
- Location within Altai Krai Location within Russia
- Coordinates: 53°20′N 79°21′E
- Country: Russia
- Region: Altai Krai
- District: Nemetsky National District
- Time zone: UTC+7:00

Degtyarka (Russian: Дегтярка) is a rural locality (a selo) and the administrative center of Degtyarsky Selsoviet of Nemetsky National District, Altai Krai, Russia. The population was 1,303 as of 2016. There are 7 streets.

== Geography ==
Degtyarka is located within the Kulunda Plain, 40 km northeast of Galbshtadt (the district's administrative centre) by road. Polevoye is the nearest rural locality.

== Ethnicity ==
The village is inhabited by Russians, Germans and others.
