= Halbstadt =

Halbstadt is German for 'half-city'. It may refer to:

- Meziměstí (Halbstadt formerly in German), a town in the Hradec Králové Region of the Czech Republic
- Molotschna (Halbstadt formerly in German), a Russian Mennonite settlement in Zaporizhia Oblast, Ukraine
- Molochansk, the current name of the above settlement, now a city
- Halbstadt, subcamp of the Nazi Gross-Rosen concentration camp
- Deutscher Nationalkreis Halbstadt, the German name of Russia's Nemetsky National District
  - Galbshtadt (Halbstadt), the administrative center of Nemetsky National District
