= Grishkovka =

Grishkovka Гришковка
- Village
- Location within Altai Krai Location within Russia
- Coordinates: 53°08′N 78°45′E
- Country: Russia
- Region: Altai Krai
- District: Nemetsky National District
- Time zone: UTC+7:00

Grishkovka (Russian: Гришковка) is a rural locality (a selo) and the administrative center of Grishkovsky Selsoviet of Nemetsky National District, Altai Krai, Russia. The population was 1330 as of 2016. There are 5 streets.

== Geography ==
Grishkovka is located within the Kulunda Plain, 19 km southwest of Galbshtadt (the district's administrative centre) by road. Andreyevka is the nearest rural locality.

== Ethnicity ==
The village is inhabited by Russians and Germans.
