= Donetsk, Rostov Oblast =

Town in Rostov Oblast, Russia

Donetsk Донецк
- Town
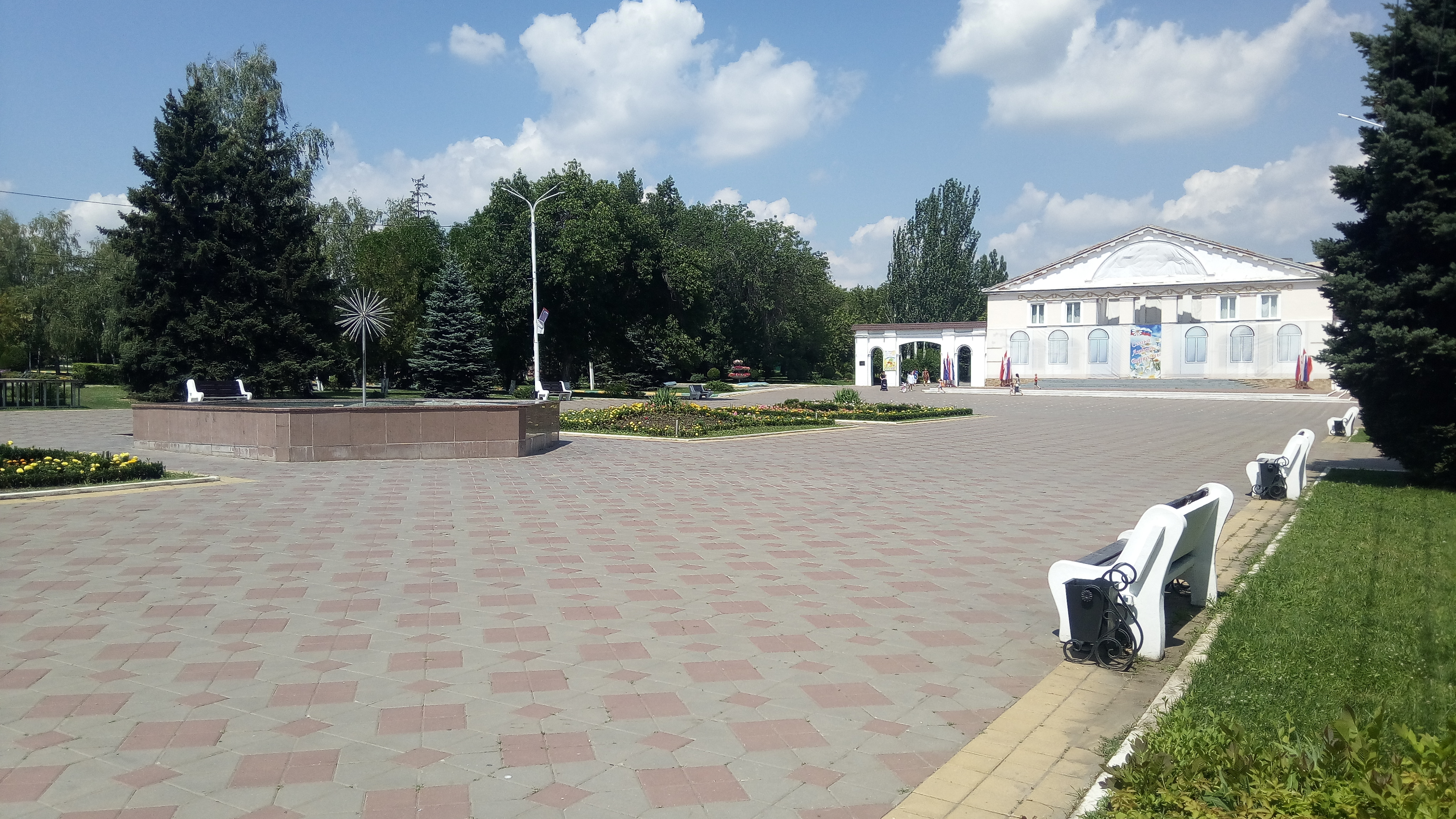
- Lenin Square with the Palace of Culture

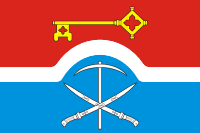
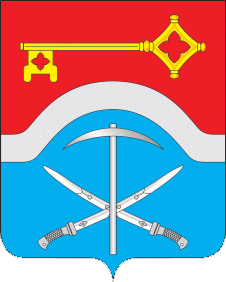
- Flag Coat of arms
- Interactive map of Donetsk
- Location of Donetsk Donetsk (European Russia) Donetsk (Russia)
- Coordinates: 48°20′N 39°56′E
- Country: Russia
- Federal subject: Rostov Oblast
- Founded: 1681
- Town status since: 1951
- Elevation: 120 m (390 ft)

Population (2010 Census)
  - Total: 50,098
  - Estimate (2025): 45,334 (−9.5%)
  - Rank: 318th in 2010

Administrative status
  - Subordinated to: Donetsk Urban Okrug
  - Capital of: Donetsk Urban Okrug

Municipal status
  - Urban okrug: Donetsk Urban Okrug
  - Capital of: Donetsk Urban Okrug
- Time zone: UTC+3 (MSK)
- Postal code: 346330–346342
- OKTMO ID: 60717000001

Donetsk (Russian: Донецк, IPA: [dɐˈnʲetsk], until 1955 Gundorovka, Russian: Гундоровка, Ukrainian: Гундорівка) is a town in Rostov Oblast, Russia, located on the Seversky Donets River on the border with Ukraine. By road it is located 388 kilometres (241 mi) west of Volgograd. Population: 50,098 (2010 census); 48,040 (2002 census); 48,673 (1989 Soviet census); 38,000 (1970).

== History ==
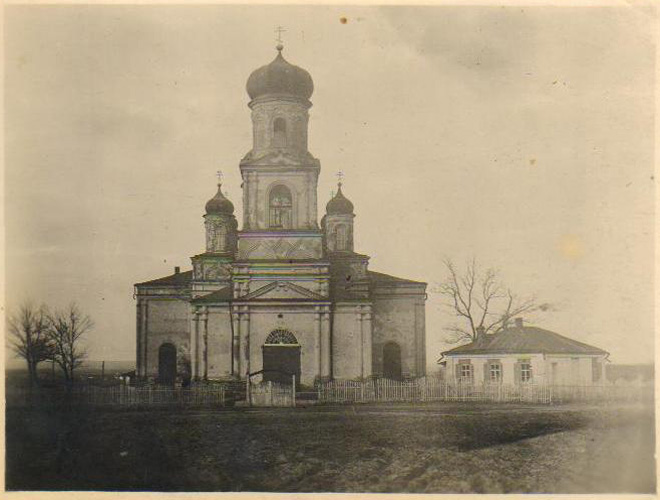
Church of the Dormition of the Theotokos in the early 20th century

The settlement was founded in 1681 by the Don Cossacks. It was controlled by various factions between 1918 and 1920, i.e. the Don Soviet Republic, the Don Republic, Soviet Russia and Soviet Ukraine. From 1920 to 1924, it was administratively part of the Donets Governorate of Ukraine. During World War II, it was occupied by Germany in 1942–1943.

It was known as Gundorovka until 1955. A museum called the Donetsk Museum of History and Ethnography was built in the city in 2005.

== Administrative status ==
Within the framework of administrative divisions, it is incorporated as Donetsk Urban Okrug—an administrative unit with the status equal to that of the districts. As a municipal division, this administrative unit also has urban okrug status.

== See also ==
- Shelling of Donetsk, Russia

== Sources ==
- Законодательное Собрание Ростовской области. Закон №340-ЗС от 25 июля 2005 г. «Об административно-территориальном устройстве Ростовской области», в ред. Закона №270-ЗС от 27 ноября 2014 г. «О внесении изменений в областной Закон "Об административно-территориальном устройстве Ростовской области"». Вступил в силу со дня официального опубликования. Опубликован: "Наше время", №187–190, 28 июля 2005 г. (Legislative Assembly of Rostov Oblast. Law #340-ZS of July 28, 2005 On the Administrative-Territorial Structure of Rostov Oblast, as amended by the Law #270-ZS of November 27, 2014 On Amending the Oblast Law "On the Administrative-Territorial Structure of Rostov Oblast". Effective as of the official publication date.).
- Законодательное Собрание Ростовской области. Закон №215-ЗС от 14 декабря 2004 г. «Об установлении границы и наделении статусом городского округа муниципального образования "Город Донецк"». Вступил в силу со дня официального опубликования. Опубликован: "Наше время", №319–320 (без приложений), 22 декабря 2004 г. (Legislative Assembly of Rostov Oblast. Law #215-ZS of December 14, 2004 On Establishing the Border and Granting Urban Okrug Status to the Municipal Formation of the "Town of Donetsk". Effective as of the official publication date.).
