= Kamyshi =

Kamyshi Камыши
- Village
- Location within Altai Krai Location within Russia
- Coordinates: 53°20′N 78°46′E
- Country: Russia
- Region: Altai Krai
- District: Nemetsky National District
- Time zone: UTC+7:00

Kamyshi (Russian: Камыши) is a rural locality (a selo) and the administrative center of Kamyshinsky Selsoviet of Nemetsky National District, Altai Krai, Russia. The population was 580 as of 2016. It contains 3 streets.

== Geography ==
Kamyshi is situated on the Kulunda Plain, 32 kilometers northwest of Galbshtadt (the administrative center of the district) by road. The nearest rural locality is Podsosnovo.

== Ethnicity ==
The village is inhabited by Russians, Germans, and other ethnicities.
