= Redkaya Dubrava =

Redkaya Dubrava Редкая Дубрава
- Village
- Location within Altai Krai Location within Russia
- Coordinates: 53°16′N 79°02′E
- Country: Russia
- Region: Altai Krai
- District: Nemetsky National District
- Time zone: UTC+7:00

Redkaya Dubrava (Russian: Редкая Дубрава) is a rural locality (a selo) and the administrative center of Redkodubravsky Selsoviet of Nemetsky National District, Altai Krai, Russia. The population was 1275 as of 2016. There are 5 streets.

== Geography ==
Redkaya Dubrava is located within the Kulunda Plain, 10 km northeast of Galbshtadt (the district's administrative centre) by road. Galbshtadt is the nearest rural locality.

== Ethnicity ==
The village is inhabited by Russians, Germans and others.
