= Harti Kanukov =

Soviet politician, soldier and journalist (1883–1933)

Harti Badievich Kanukov (Russian cyrillic: Харти Бадиевич Кануков, Zundov, Don Host Oblast, December 5 jul./December 17 gre., 1883 – Elista, February 7, 1933) was a Soviet politician, soldier, journalist, translator and writer Kalmyk origin.

== Life ==
He was a member of the Communist Party and the Red Army, where he was a cavalry brigade commissioner.

Despite being born in a semi-nomad family, he could go to school and became a rural teacher in Denisovski (1902–1908)

In 1908, the police arrested him for organising a trade union revolt, but he was immediately set free under surveillance. In 1909, he served in the Cossack regiment where he later returned, but in 1915 he quit it due to an illness.

From 1920 to 1921, he was assistant and chief of Intelligence.
