= Joanna Moro =

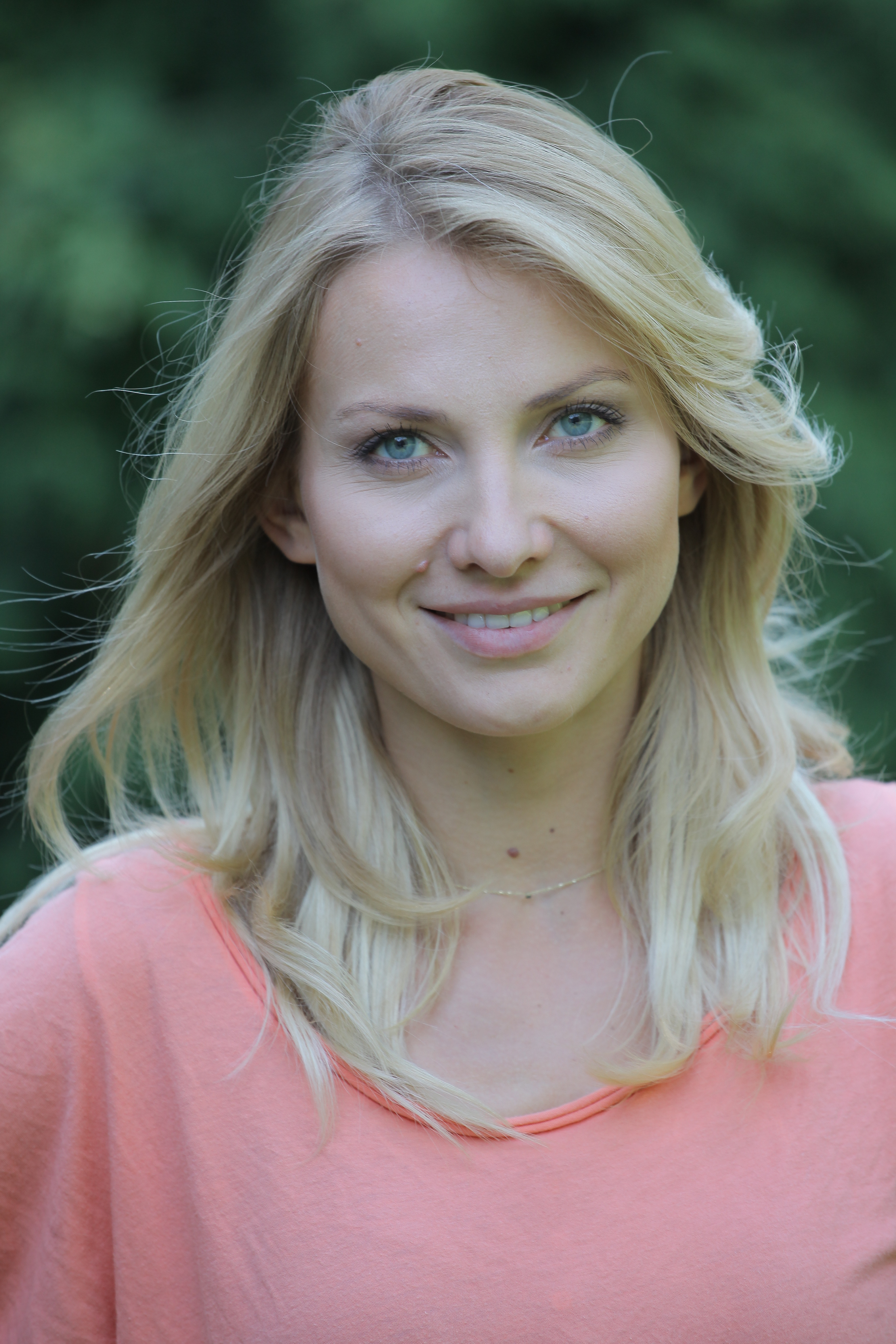
- Born: 13 December 1984 (age 41); Vilnius, Lithuania
- Years active: since 2006
- Spouse: Mirosław Szpilewski (m. 2008)
- Children: 3

Joanna Moro (born 13 December 1984) is a Lithuanian-born Polish film and theater actress, singer and TV presenter.

== Early life ==
Moro was born and raised in Vilnius in a family of Lithuanian Poles. She has a younger sister, Kamila. In 2003, she emigrated from her native Lithuania to Poland, starting her studies and settling in Warsaw.

== Career ==
Moro is a graduate of the Gymnasium Adam Mickiewicz in Vilnius. In her youth, she belonged to the school theater club headed by Irena Litwinowicz. She was active in the Polish Theater in Vilnius. In 2003, she moved to Warsaw, where in 2007 she graduated from the Aleksander Zelwerowicz National Academy of Dramatic Art in Warsaw.

In 2007, Moro joined the cast of the TVP2 series Barwy szczęścia, in which she portrayed Zofia Karnicka-Walawska. She gained wide recognition in 2012 thanks to the role of Anna German in the series Anna German: The mystery of the white angel. In 2013, she released a studio album entitled Piosenki Anny German, which she recorded together with Olga Szomańska and Agnieszka Babicz. In June 2013, she hosted the 50th National Festival of Polish Song in Opole. Her performance at the festival with the song by Anna German "Człowieczy los" met with widespread criticism in the media.

In 2014, Moro participated in the fourteenth season of Polsat's Dancing with the Stars: Taniec z gwiazdami, together with Rafał Maserak, she took second place in the final. In the years 2014–2015 she played Sylwia Kubus, the title character of the TVP1 series Blondynka. In 2016, she participated in the sixth edition of Polsat's program Twoja twarz brzmi znajomo; she won the eighth episode, and the prize in the form of a check for PLN 10,000, which was allocated to a charge of the “Help on Time” foundation.

== Personal life ==
Moro speaks the following languages: Polish, English, Italian, Lithuanian and Russian. On 15 August 2008, in the Church of St. Peter and St. Paul, Vilnius, she married Mirosław Szpilewski They have two sons, Mikołaj and Jeremi, and a daughter, Ewa.
