= Der Internatsional =

Der Internatsional (Yiddish: דער אינטערנאציאנאל, 'The Internationale') was a Yiddish language weekly newspaper published from Yekaterinoslav 1917-1920. The newspaper began publishing on August 1, 1917.

Initially Der Internatsional was the organ of the Yekaterinoslav Committee of the General Jewish Labour Bund. As of 1918 it functioned as the organ of the Regional Committee of the Bund for the Yekaterinoslav Governorate, the Kharkov Governorate, the Taurida Governorate and the Don Oblast.
