= Anna German (TV series) =

Russian TV series about singer Anna German

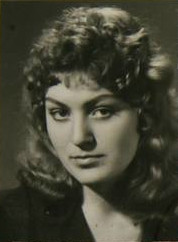
- Also known as: Anna German: The Mistery of the White Angel
- Анна Герман: Тайна белого ангела
- Genre: Drama, Melodrama, Biographical
- Inspired by: Anna German
- Screenplay by: Aleksandr Kononov
- Directed by: Aleksandr Timenko & Waldemar Krzystek
- Narrated by: Stanisław Olejniczak
- Countries of origin: Russia, Poland, Croatia, Ukranie.
- Original language: Russian
- No. of seasons: 1
- No. of episodes: 10

Production
- Producers: Vladislav Ryashin, Galina Balan-Timkina, Dmitry Olenich
- Production company: Star Media

Original release
- Network: Channel One
- Release: 3 September 2012
- Network: TVP1
- Release: 22 February 2013

Anna German: The Mistery of the White Angel (Polish: Anna German. Tajemnica Białego Anioła - Russian: Анна Герман. Тайна белого ангела) is a Russian biographical drama and melodrama series about the life of Polish—Russian singer Anna German, directed by Waldemar Krzystek and Aleksandr Timenko. The series was filmed in 2012 to commemorate the 30th anniversary of Anna German's passing and follows important events in German's life. The series ran for 1 season with 10 episodes.

== Controversy ==
The series was criticised because of multiple innacuracies and differences from the historical truth of German's life, including the dramatisation or fabrication of certain events.

== Emission ==
The series was first aired on Russia's Channel One TV station on 3 September 2012. In February 2013, it aired on Poland's TVP1, reaching an average of over 6 million views per episode.

== Cast ==
Actor	Role
Joanna Moro	Anna German
Anna Kirina	Anna German
Ekaterina Tsevmenko	Anna German
Mariya Poroshina	Irma Martens-German
Marat Basharov	Valentin Lavrishin
Mateusz Młodzianowski	Herman Berner
Simon Sędrowski	Zbigniew Tucholski
Konstantin Milovanov	Eugen German
Yekaterina Vasilyeva	Anna German's grandmother
Igor Wilewski-Sobczyk	Zbigniew I. Tucholski
Julija Rutberg	Anna Akhmatova
Elena Bondareva-Repina	Faina Ranevskaya
Christopher Krupinski	Julian Krzywka
Marieta Zhukovskaya	Aniela
Karolina Gorczyca	Jadwiga Kowalska
Olga Frycz	Janechka
Mariusz Adamski	Peter
Agnieszka Sienkiewicz	Magda
Zbigniew Styrczula	Junosha
Adalbert Rusin	Jan
Gilberto Idonea	Pietro Carriaggi
Tommaso Ramenghi	Renato
Gaetano Solfrizzi	Luigi Tenco
Marija Zvonaryova	Anna Kachalina
Dorothea Mercouri	Iolanda Cristina Gigliotti
Michele Di Giacomo	Adriano Celentano
Anna Szymańczyk	Katharina Gärtner
Valery Legin	Yevgeny Matveyev

== See also ==
- List of Russian television series
