= Anna German =

Russian-Polish singer (1936–1982)

- Анна Герман
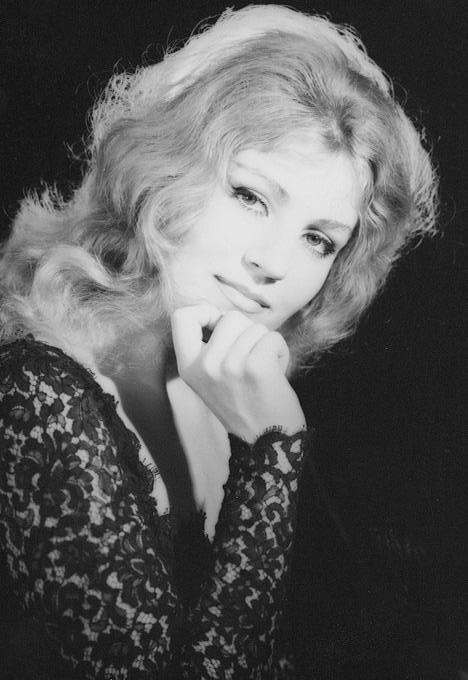
- German in the 1960s
- Born: Anna Viktoria Yevgenyevna German; 14 February 1936; Urgench, Uzbek SSR, Soviet Union
- Died: 26 August 1982 (aged 46); Warsaw, Polish People's Republic
- Occupation: Singer
- Years active: 1960–1982
- Awards

Anna Wiktoria German-Tucholska (Russian: Анна Виктория Герман, romanized: Anna Viktoria German, 14 February 1936 – 26 August 1982) was a Polish singer (lirico-spinto), immensely popular in Poland and in the Soviet Union in the 1960s and the 1970s. She released over a dozen music albums with songs in Polish, as well as several albums with Russian repertoire. Throughout her music career, she also recorded songs in the German, Italian, Spanish, English, and Latin languages.

== Family background and early life ==
Anna German was born in the town of Urgench in Uzbekistan (then located in the Uzbek Soviet Socialist Republic of the Soviet Union).

Her mother, Irma Martens (1909 – 2007), was the child of Plautdietsch-speaking Mennonites with descendants from the Netherlands who exchanged Friesland for the area around the Vistula delta and on Empress Catherine the Great's invitation came to live in the Russian Empire. Martens' mother Anna Friesen was born in present-day Ukraine. Later, the family settled in the Kuban. Martens' native language was a Plautdietsch variant with both German and Dutch influences. In the 1996 radio programme Spoor Terug on Dutch public broadcaster VPRO, Martens said that she and her family identified as Dutch despite her Polish passport. Martens studied German in Odesa, but had to leave her village due to a lack of work as a teacher and instead moved to Redkaya Dubrava in Altai Krai. Following the NKVD Order No. 00439, (Note: Soviet officials mistakenly believed that Mennonites and Dutch settlers were in fact Germans due to the similarities in language and faith.) Martens fled to Uzbekistan, where she met Eugen Hörmann.

Her accountant father, Eugen (Eugeniusz) Hörmann (in Russian, Герман), was also of a German–Russian pastor family and born in the Polish city of Łódź in Congress Poland (then part of the Russian Empire). Hörmann's father, and Anna's grandfather, Friedrich Hörmann, who had studied theology in Łódź, was in 1929 incarcerated in Gulag Plesetsk by communists for being a priest; he died there. In 1937, during the NKVD's anti-German operation, Eugen Hörmann was arrested in Urgench on false charges of spying, and executed (officially, sentenced to ten years in prison).

Thereafter Anna, (Note: In a 1996 documentary on Irma Martens, Anna German is referred to as Annie.) with her mother and grandmother, survived in the Kemerovo region of Siberia, as well as in Tashkent, and later in the Kirghiz and Kazakh SSRs.

In 1946, German's mother (who had married Herman Gerner, a Polish People's Army soldier) was able to take the family to Poland to Nowa Ruda and in 1949 to Wrocław.

== Career ==
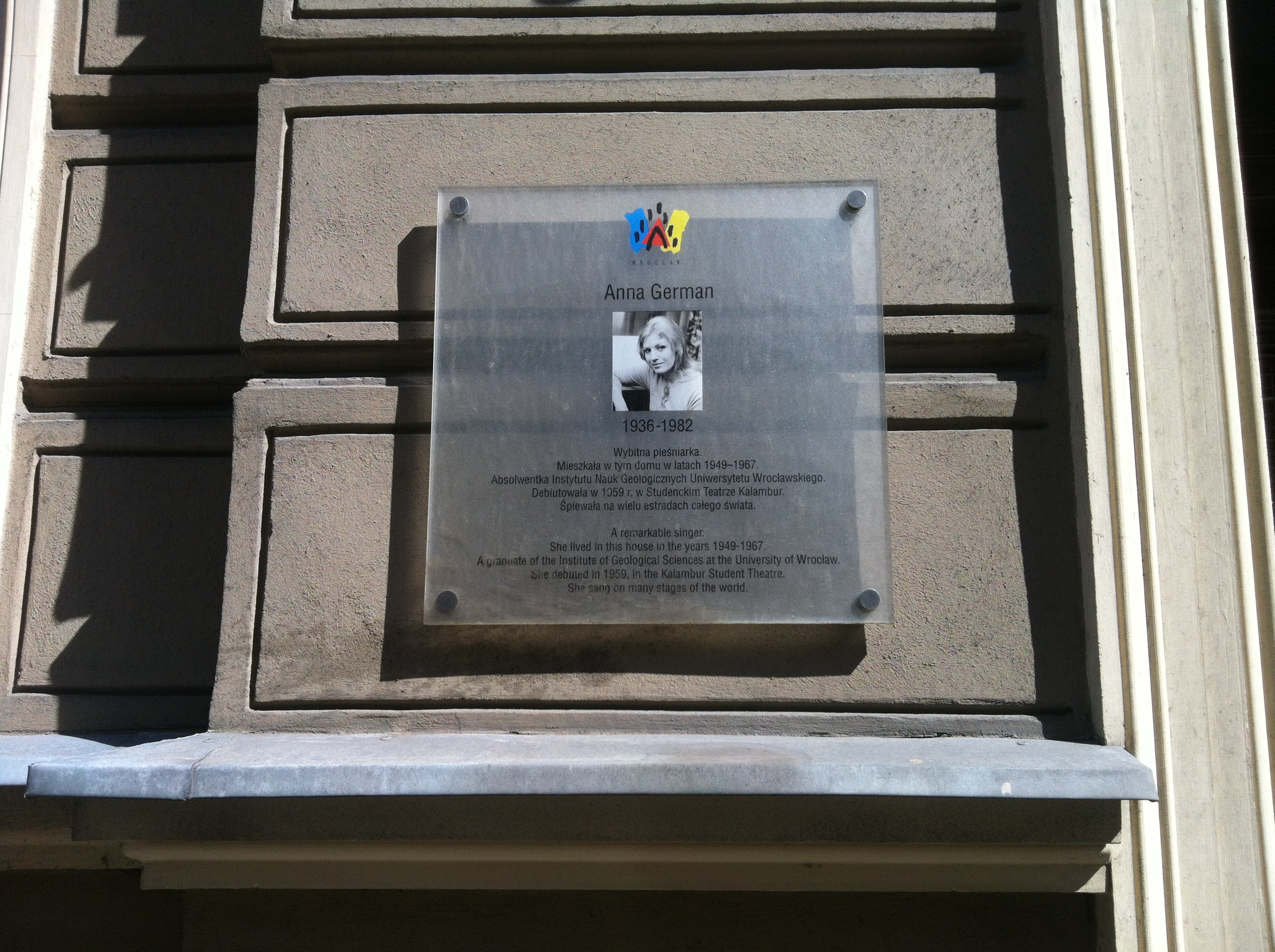
Anna German plaque in Wrocław (Trzebnicka Street)

Anna quickly learned Polish and several other languages and grew up hiding her family heritage. She graduated from the Geological Institute of the University of Wrocław. During her university years, she began her music career at the Kalambur Theater. German became known to the general public when she won the 1964 II Festival of Polish Songs in Opole with her song Tańczące Eurydyki ('Dancing Eurydices'). One year later, she won the first prize in the Sopot International Song Festival.

German performed in the Marché international de l'édition musicale in Cannes, as well as on the stages of Belgium, Germany, United States, Canada and Australia.

She also sang in Russian, English, Italian, Spanish, Latin, German and Mongolian. She recorded several albums for Polskie Nagrania Muza in Poland and Melodiya in the Soviet Union. In 2001, six of her Polish albums were reissued on CDs. In recent years, many compilation albums of her songs have also been released in both Russia and Poland.

=== Career in Italy ===
In December 1966 in Milan, German signed a contract with the CDI company to release her records, thus becoming the first performer from behind the "Iron Curtain" who recorded in Italy. In Italy, German had performed at the Sanremo Music Festival, starred in a television show, recorded a programme with the singer Domenico Modugno, performed at the festival of Neapolitan songs in Sorrento and received the "Oscar della simpatia" award.

=== Car accident and treatment ===
On 27 August 1967, while in Italy, on the road between Forlì and Milan, Anna German was involved in a severe car accident. At high speed, the car driven by the impresario of the singer crashed into a concrete fence. German was thrown from the car through the windshield. She suffered multiple fractures and other internal injuries. An investigation revealed that the driver of the car – her manager Renato Serio – fell asleep at the wheel.

After the accident, German had not regained consciousness. After the plaster was taken off, the singer still laid in hospital for half a year. Then it took her a few months to relearn to sit and walk.

Later, she released the autobiographical book Wróć do Sorrento? ('Come Back to Sorrento?'), dedicated to the Italian period of her career. The book's circulation was 30,000 copies.

=== Career in the Soviet Union ===
In 1964, German toured the Soviet Union for the first time as part of a delegation of Polish artists, performing songs by George Gershwin, Mark Fradkin, Arno Babajanian. The editor of the "Melodiya" Anna Kachalina invited German to record some songs in Polish and Italian. Her first songs in Russian were recorded in the fall of 1964.

In the 1970s, German toured, performed and recorded in the Soviet Union, working with Aleksandra Pakhmutova, Yevgeniy Martynov, Vladimir Shainsky, David Tukhmanov, Oscar Feltsman, Yan Frenkel, Vyacheslav Dobrynin, Alexander Morozov and others. She had become an acclaimed and popular artist there. She remembers: "I loved touring the Soviet Union. <...> These tours did not bring a lot of money, it was much more profitable to fly to America or even participate in some kind of concerts in Europe. But nothing can compare with the emotional reception in Soviet cities and towns."

Her most notable songs in Russian are "Shine, Shine, My Star", "And I like him" (Russian: А он мне нравится, lit. 'A on mne nravitsya'), "Hope" (Russian: Надежда, lit. 'Nadezhda'), "No Hurry" (Russian: Не спеши, lit. 'Ne speshi'), "Randomness" (Russian: Случайность, lit. 'Sluchaynost''), "When Gardens Bloomed" (Russian: Когда цвели сады, lit. 'Kogda tsveli sady'), "Echo of Love" (Russian: Эхо любви, lit. 'Ekho lyubvi').

== Personal life ==
On 23 March 1972, married Zbigniew Tucholski. Their son, Zbigniew Tucholski, was born in 1975. In the last years of her life, she composed some church songs. Before she died in 1982 of osteosarcoma (at the age of 46), she joined the Seventh-day Adventist Church. German was buried at the Evangelical Cemetery in Warsaw.

== Remembrance ==
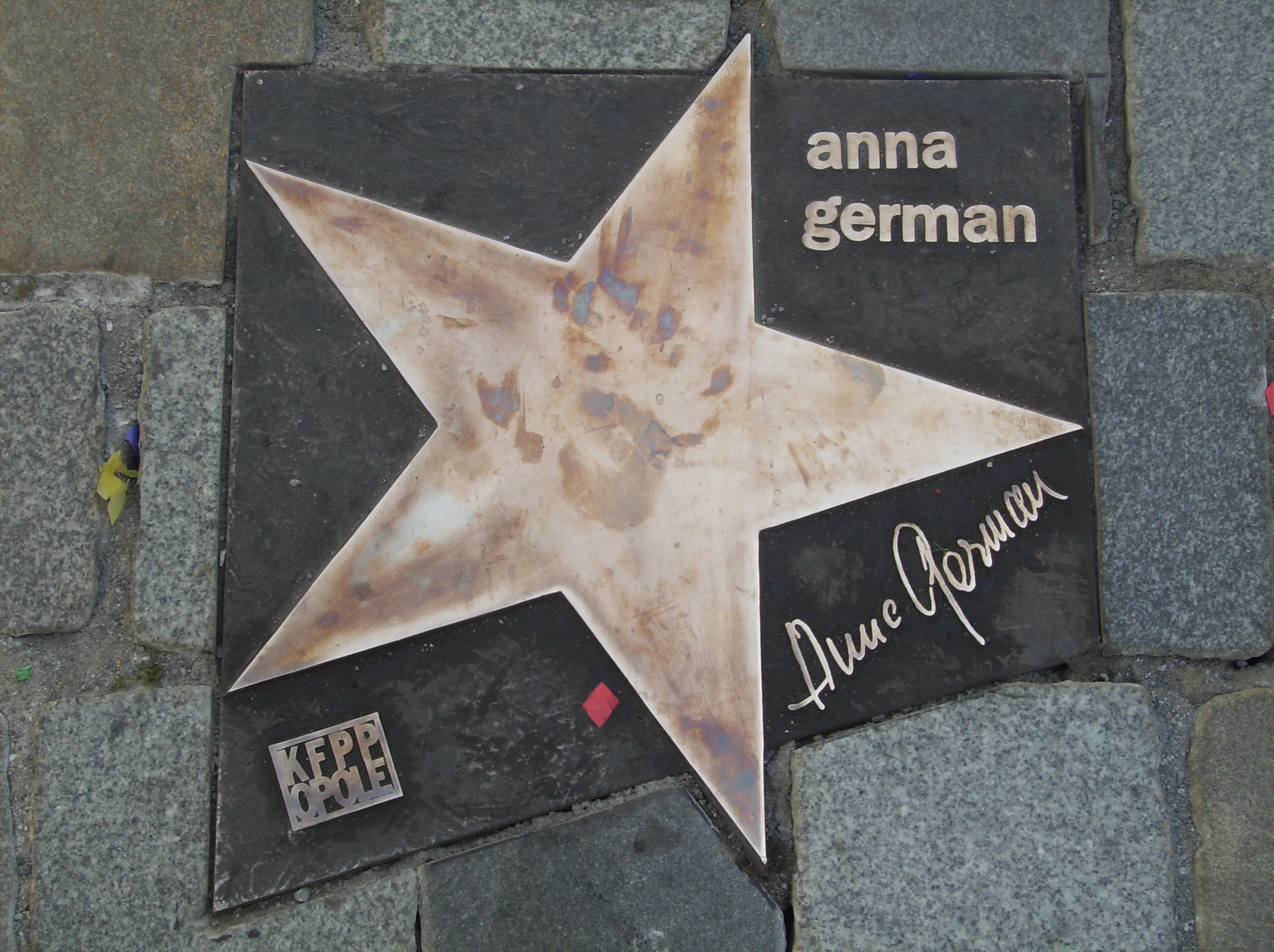
Anna German's star on the Walk of Fame in Opole

- The main street in Urgench, Uzbekistan, the birthplace of Anna German, bears her name.
- The asteroid 2519 Y discovered in 1975 by Russian astronomer Tamara Smirnova was named in honour of Anna German.
- The amphitheatre in Zielona Góra, Poland, has been named in Anna German's memory.
- In 2002, the Tańczące Eurydyki Song Festival aimed at popularizing the musical legacy of Anna German and Polish popular music was launched.
- The Anna German Musical High School in Białystok bears the name of the singer.
- In 2012, a commemorative plaque was unveiled in Wrocław at the entrance to the house where Anna German used to live.
- In 2012, a Russian biographical mini-series (co-produced with Poland, Ukraine and Croatia) about the life of Anna German was filmed.
- A star on the Moscow Walk of Fame honouring Anna German was unveiled.
- Several streets in Polish cities including Warsaw and Rzeszów were named in remembrance of the singer.
- In 2013, a star on the Walk of Fame of the National Festival of Polish Song in Opole devoted to Anna German was unveiled.

== Books about Anna German ==
- 1974 Nagrabiecki Jan: Anna German. 1974
- Aleksander Zygariov: Anna German. 1988
- Aleksander Zygariov: Anna German. 1998 (reissue)
- Mariola Pryzwan: Wspomnienia o Annie German. 1999
- Adriana Polak: Człowieczy los. Wspomnienia o Annie German. 2000
- Artur Hörmann: Die unbekannte Anna German. 2003 (The book was written by the uncle of Anna and brother her father Eugene Herman)
- Mariola Pryzwan: Tańcząca Eurydyka. Wspomnienia o Annie German. 2008
- Ivan Ilichev: Анна Герман – Гори, гори, моя звезда!. 2010
- Jordan Naoum: Anna German. 2011 ISBN 6138327977
- Mariola Pryzwan: Anna German o sobie. 2012
- Ivan Ilichev: Мы долгое эхо (We long echo). 2012
- Mariola Pryzwan: Tańcząca Eurydyka. Anna German we wspomnieniach. 2013
- Marzena Baranowska: German. Osobisty album Anny German. 2013
- Ivan Ilichev: Анна Герман. Белый ангел песни (White angel of the song). 2013
- German. Śpiewający anioł. Super album. 2013
- Ivan Ilichev: Эхо любви (Echoes of love). 2013
- Volga Yerafeyenka: Anna German. „Uśmiechaj się”. 2014
- Irma Martens-Berner: Człowieczy los. Wspomnienia matki Anny German. 2014, ISBN 978-83-7295-299-8 (Consultants books: son A. German, Dr. Zbigniew I. Tucholsky and her husband, engineer Zbigniew A. Tucholsky)
- Ivan Ilichev: Анна Герман. Сто воспоминаний о великой певице (Anna German. A hundred memories of great singer). 2016

== Literary works ==
- 1970 „Wróć do Sorrento?...” (Come Back to Sorrento?...)
- Bajka o skrzydlatym szpaku (The tale of the winged Starling). The book is written by Anna to her son
- 1988 «Вернись в Сорренто?...» translated from Polish into Russian by R. Bello
- 2002 „Wróć do Sorrento?...” reissue
- 2012 „Wróć do Sorrento?...” reissue

== Discography ==
=== Albums ===
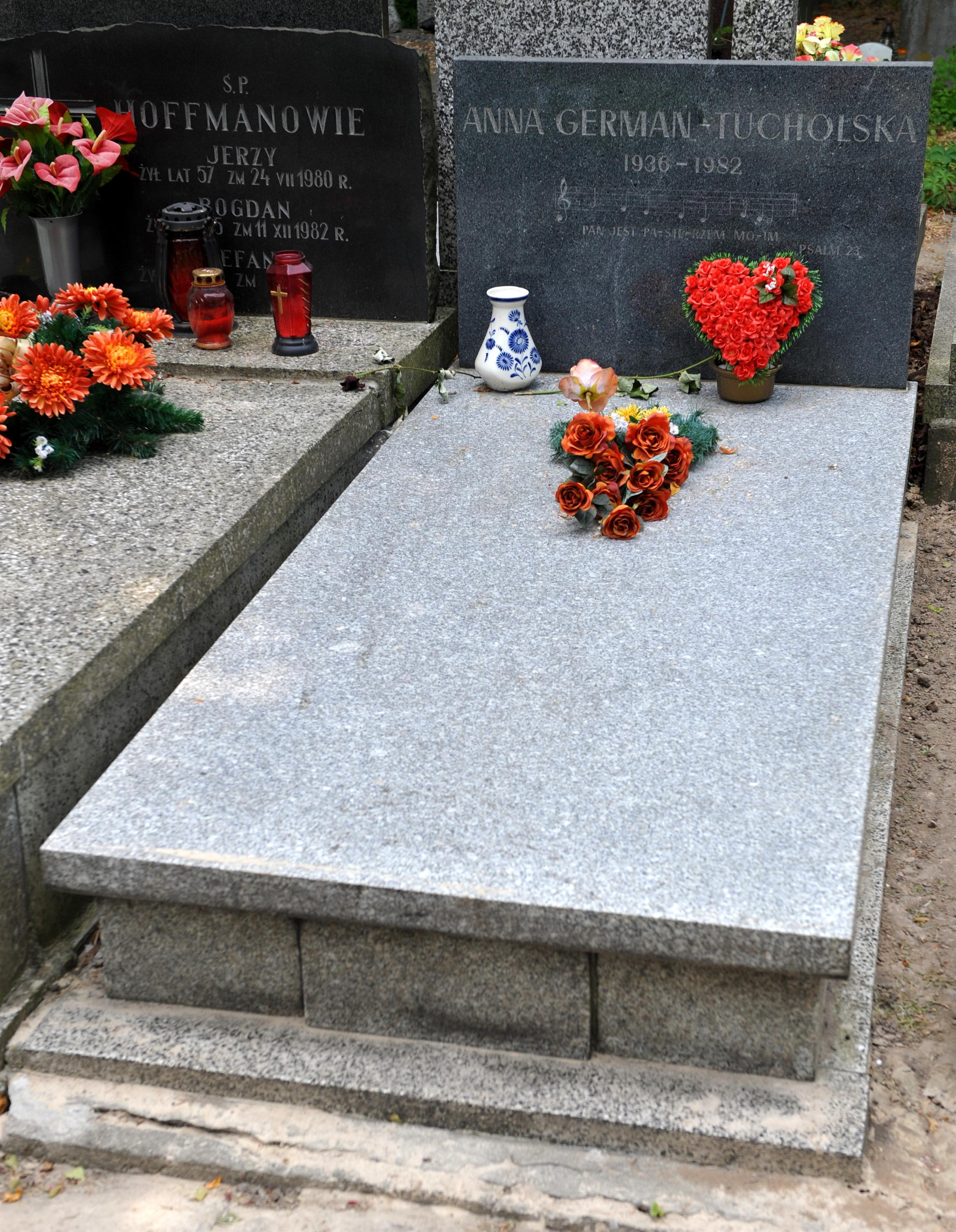
Anna German grave in Protestant Reformed Cemetery in Warsaw

- Na tamten brzeg (1964) [Onto that shore]
- Tańczące Eurydyki (1965) [Dancing Eurydices]
- Recital piosenek (1967) [A recital of songs]
- I classici della musica napoletana (1967) [Classics of the Canzone Napoletana]
- Поёт Анна Герман (1968) [Anna German Sings]
- Człowieczy los (1970) [Fate of Man]
- Domenico Scarlatti – Arie z opery Tetide in Sciro (1971) [Domenico Scarlatti – Arias from opera Tetide in Sciro]
- Wiatr mieszka w dzikich topolach (1972) [Wind lives in wild poplars]
- To chyba maj (1974) [It has to be May]
- Anna German (1975)
- Anna German (1977)
- Anna German (1979)
- Pomyśl o mnie (1979) [Think about me]
- Tylko w tangu/Dookoła kipi lato (1979) [Only in tango/Summer is all around]
- Śpiewa Anna German (1979) [Anna German is singing]
- Надежда (Nadezhda, 1980) [Hope]
- Последняя встреча (1983) [Last meeting]

=== Singles ===
- "The Man I Love" (1964)
- "Снежана" / "Без тебя" (1965)
- "Не спеши" / "На тот берег" (1965)
- "Свет звезды" / "Дай мне помечтать" (1965)
- "Ночной разговор" / "Всё прошло" (1965)
- "Двое" / "По грибы" (1965)
- "Deszcz na szybie" / "Uroczysko" (1967)
- "Chcę być kochaną" / "Cygański wóz" (1967)
- "Cyganeria" / "Zimowe dzwony" (1967)
- "Melodia dla synka" / "Jesteś moją miłością" (1969)
- "Człowieczy los" / "Dziękuje ci mamo" (1970)
- "Gałązka snów" / "Trampowski szlak" (1970)
- "Złociste mgły" / "Za grosiki marzeń" (1970)
- "A mama asi como" / "Quadro cartas" (1971)
- "Поёт Анна Герман" (1971)
- "Анна Герман" (1972)
- "Warszawa w różach" / "Wiatr mieszka w dzikich topolach" (1972)
- "Анна Герман" (1974)
- "Ты, только ты" (1975)
- "Гори, гори, моя звезда" / "Из-за острова на стрежень" (1975)
- "Когда цвели сады" (1977)
- "Далёк тот день" (1977)
- "Я помню всё" (1979)
- "Гори, гори, моя звезда" (1982)

=== Later reprints and compilation albums ===
- 1984: Jesteś moja miłością LP
- 1987: Эхо любви (Echo lubvi) – live '79 LP
- 1989: Anna German LP
- 1989: Znaki zapytania LP
- 1990: Powracające słowa vol. 1 LP
- 1990: Powracające słowa vol. 2 LP
- 1991: Zakwitnę różą CD
- 1991: Recital piosenek CD
- 1994: Nasza ścieżka CD
- 1994: Złote przeboje neapolitanskie MC
- 1995: Planeta Anna part 1 MC
- 1995: Planeta Anna part 2 MC
- 1996: Незабытый мотив (Nezabitiy motiv) CD
- 1996: Лучшие песни (Luchshie pesni) CD
- 1998: Когда цвели сады (Kogda tsveli sadi) CD
- 1998: Wiatr mieszka w dzikich topolach CD
- 1999: Tańczące Eurydyki CD
- 1999: Platynowa kolekcja CD
- 1999: Złote przeboje CD
- 1999: Bal u Posejdona (Złota kolekcja) CD
- 1999: Антология советского шлягера (Antologia sovetskogo shlagera) MC
- 2000: Анна Герман. Российская эстрадная музыкальная энциклопедия (Rossiyskaya estradnaya muzikalnaya encyclopaedia) CD
- 2000: Последняя встреча (Poslednyaya vstrecha) CD
- 2001: Quiet words of love (Russian) (Любви негромкие слова) CD
- 2001: Ваши любимые песни (Vashi lyubimie pesni) CD
- 2001: Tańczące Eurydyki CD
- 2001: Recital piosenek CD
- 2001: Człowieczy los CD
- 2001: Wiatr mieszka w dzikich topolach CD
- 2001: Domenico Scarlatti – Arie z opery "Tetida in Sciro" CD
- 2001: To chyba maj CD
- 2001: Pomyśl o mnie CD
- 2001: Luchshee – Zvyozdi sovetskoy estradi CD
- 2002: Najlepsze piosenki CD
- 2003: Наши лучшие песни (Nashi lyubimie pesni) CD
- 2003: Człowiecy los collection CD
- 2003: Золотой век русской эстрады (Zolotoy vek russkoy estrady) CD
- 2003: Посидим, помолчим. Полное собрание песен (Posidim, pomolchim) vol.1 CD
- 2003: Спасибо тебе мое сердце. Полное собрание песен (Spasibo tebe moyo serdtse) vol.2 CD
- 2004: Złote przeboje CD
- 2004: Самое лучшее (Samoe luchshee) CD
- 2007: MP3 collection
- 2008: Надежда CD
- 2013: Tańczące Eurydyki CD
- 2019: Анна Герман. Избранное LP

== Filmography ==
- 1966: Marynarka to męska przygoda (documentary) – ensemble cast
- 1970: Landscape After the Battle (Krajobraz po bitwie)
- 1970: Prom – singing
- 1970: Balladyna (TV show) – singing
- 1970: Wyspy szczęśliwe. Śpiewa Anna German (short film)
- 1977: Sudba (film) – singing Echo Miłości
- 2012: Anna German (Russian TV series) – singing (her songs have been used in the series)

== See also ==
- Music of Poland
- List of Polish people
