= Anthem of the Don Cossacks =

Anthem of Rostov Oblast, Russia

Всколыхнулся, взволновался православный Тихий Дон
English: "It Has Shaken, It Has Stirred, The Quiet Orthodox Don"
- Regional anthem of Rostov Oblast
- Also known as: Гимн Ростовской области Гимн донских казаков (English: Anthem of Rostov Oblast; Anthem of the Don Cossacks)
- Lyrics: Fyodor Anisimov, 1853
- Music: Alexander Listopadov
- Adopted: 10 October 1996

Audio sample
- A cappella male choral vocal recording (1853 original version): file; help

The Anthem of the Don Cossacks is a Russian patriotic song and the symbol of the Don Cossacks. It was originally used as the anthem of the former self-proclaimed Don Republic (1918–1920), and currently serves as the regional anthem of the Rostov Oblast, a federal subject of Russia. It was adopted on 10 October 1996. It was originally written by Fyodor Anisimov in 1853, at the beginning of the Crimean War.

== Lyrics ==
=== Current lyrics ===
These are the lyrics for the anthem of Rostov Oblast. They utilise the first, second and fifth verses of a set of lyrics written in 1917 or 1918, shortly after the February Revolution.

Note that the first two syllables of the first, second and fourth lines of each stanza and the last two lines of each stanza are repeated to follow the rhythmic composition.

Russian official

I
Всколых– всколыхнулся, взволновался
Право– православный Тихий Дон.
𝄆 И послушно отозвался
На при– на призыв свободы он. 𝄇

II
Зеле– зеленеет степь донская,
Золо– золотятся волны нив.
𝄆 И с простора, слух лаская,
Вольный, вольный слышится призыв. 𝄇

III
Славься, славься, Дон, и в наши годы
В память, в память вольной старины,
𝄆 В час невзгоды — честь свободы
Отсто– отстоят твои сыны. 𝄇

Russian Latin alphabet

I
Vskolyh– vskolyhnulsja, vzvolnovalsja
Pravo– pravoslavnyj Tihij Don.
𝄆 I poslušno otozvalsja
Na pri–, na prizyv svobody on. 𝄇

II
Zele– zelenejet stepj donskaja,
Zolo– zolotjatsja volny niv.
𝄆 I s prostora, sluh laskaja,
Voljnyj, voljnyj slyšitsja prizyv. 𝄇

III
Slavjsja, slavjsja, Don, i v naši gody
V pamjatj, v pamjatj voljnoj stariny,
𝄆 V čas nevzgody — čestj svobody
Otsto– otstojat tvoi syny. 𝄇

IPA transcription

1
[fskə.ɫɨx | fskə.ɫɨx.ˈnuɫ.sə vzvəɫ.nɐ.ˈvaɫ.sə |]
[prə.vɐ | prə.vɐ.ˈsɫav.nɨj ˈtʲi.xʲɪj don ‖]
𝄆 [i‿pɐf.ˈsʲu.dʊ | ɐ.tɐz.ˈvaɫ.sə |]
[nə‿prʲɪ | nə‿prʲɪ.ˈzɨf svɐ.ˈbo.dɨ on ‖] 𝄇

2
[zʲɪ.lʲɪ | zʲɪ.lʲɪ.ˈnʲe.(j)ɪt sʲtʲepʲ dɐn.ˈska.jə |]
[zə.ɫɐ | zə.ɫɐ.ˈtʲat.t͡sʲə ˈvoɫ.nɨ nɨf ‖]
𝄆 [i‿s‿prɐ.ˈsto.rə | sɫux ɫɐ.ˈska.jə |]
[ˈvolʲ.nɨj | ˈvolʲ.nɨj ˈsɫɨ.ʂɨ.t͡sʲə prʲɪ.ˈzɨf ‖] 𝄇

3
[ˈsɫafʲ.sʲə | ˈsɫafʲ.sʲə don i‿v‿ˈna.ʂɨ ˈgo.dɨ |]
[f‿ˈpa.mʲɪtʲ | f‿ˈpa.mʲɪtʲ ˈvolʲ.nəj stə.rʲɪ.ˈnɨ ‖]
𝄆 [f‿t͡ɕas nʲɪvz.ˈɡo.dɨ | t͡ɕesʲtʲ svɐ.ˈbo.dɨ |]
[ɐt͡s.stɐ | ɐt͡s.stɐ.ˈjat tvɐ.ˈ(j)i sɨ.ˈnɨ ‖] 𝄇

English translation

I
It has – it has shaken, it has stirred,
The Quiet – the Quiet Orthodox Don.
𝄆 It flowed all o'er, it responded
To the – to the call of freedom. 𝄇

II
With green – with green the Don steppe glimmers,
With gold – with gold the furrows shine.
𝄆 And from the expanses, caressing the ear,
The call – the call of freedom is heard. 𝄇

III
Glory, Glory to Don, now in our years,
In the – in the memory of free old times.
𝄆 In times of hardship, in honour of freedom,
Thy sons – thy son will defend them. 𝄇

=== Original lyrics ===
1853 original

I
Всколыхнулся, взволновался,
Православный Тихий Дон,
𝄆 И послушно отозвался
На призыв Монарха он. 𝄇

II
Он детей своих сзывает
На кровавый бранный пир,
𝄆 К туркам в гости снаряжает,
Чтоб добыть России мир. 𝄇

III
С Богом, дети, ведь широкий
Переплыть вам лишь Дунай,
𝄆 А за ним уж недалеко
Цареград и наших знай. 𝄇

IV
Сорок лет тому в Париже
Нас прославили отцы,
𝄆 Цареград — ещё к нам ближе…
В путь же, с Богом, молодцы! 𝄇

V
Стойте крепко за святую
Церковь — общую нам мать —
𝄆 Бог вам даст луну чужую
С храмов Божиих сорвать, 𝄇

VI
На местах, где чтут пророка,
Скласть Христовы алтари,
𝄆 И тогда к звезде востока
Придут с запада цари! 𝄇

VII
Над землею всей прольется
Мира кроткого заря,
𝄆 И до неба вознесется,
Слава Русского Царя! 𝄇

Russian Republic version
(20 September 1918)

I
Всколыхнулся, взволновался
Православный Тихий Дон.
𝄆 И повсюду отозвался
На призыв свободы он. 𝄇

II
Зеленеет степь донская,
Золотятся волны нив.
𝄆 И с простора, слух лаская,
Вольный слышится призыв. 𝄇

III
Дон детей своих сзывает
В Круг Державный Войсковой
𝄆 Атамана выбирает
Всенародною душой. 𝄇

IV
В боевое грозно время,
В память дедов и отцов —
𝄆 Вновь свободно стало племя
Возродившихся Донцов. 𝄇

V
Славься, Дон, и в наши годы
В память вольной старины,
𝄆 В час невзгоды — честь свободы
Отстоят твои сыны. 𝄇

Don Republic version
(July 1918)

I
Всколыхнулся, взволновался,
Православный Тихий Дон
𝄆 Громкий клич его раздался:
То — бойцов сзывает он! 𝄇

II
Гей, Ермак, казак могучий!
Рать живую собирай,
𝄆 Пусть несется грозной тучей
На врага за вольный край! 𝄇

III
За поля, луга родные,
За могилы стариков,
𝄆 За напевы неземные
Умереть казак готов. 𝄇

IV
Ты не плачь, не плачь, казачка!
Слышишь — в поле кони ржут?
𝄆 Там видна лихая скачка,
Казаки в поход идут! 𝄇

V
Ты же, матушка родная,
Сына в бой благослови…
𝄆 Пусть слеза твоя святая
Гнев зажжет в его крови. 𝄇

VI
Пусть дрожит враг и трепещет
Мщенья рыцарей донцов…
𝄆 Пусть волна донская плещет,
Славу храбрых удальцов. 𝄇

==== Translation ====
1853 original

I
It has shaken, it has stirred,
The Quiet Orthodox Don.
𝄆 And it obediently responded
To the call of the Monarch. 𝄇

II
It is calling its children
To a bloody battle,
𝄆 Sending them to visit the Turks,
To bring peace for Russia. 𝄇

III
God bless you, children, for you
Only have to cross the wide Danube,
𝄆 And beyond it's not far away
Tsargrad and know our people. 𝄇

IV
Forty years ago in Paris
We were glorified by our fathers,
𝄆 Constantinople is even closer to us…
On the way, God be with you, fellows! 𝄇

V
Stand firm for the Holy
Church, our common mother,
𝄆 And God will give you the power
To pluck the crescent from the temples of God. 𝄇

VI
In places where the Prophet is revered,
Build altars of Christ,
𝄆 And then to the eastern star
Western kings will come! 𝄇

VII
Over the whole earth will be spiled
Dawn of the world of the meek,
𝄆 And it will ascend to heaven,
Glory of the Russian Tsar! 𝄇

Russian Republic version
(20 September 1918)

I
It has shaken, it has stirred,
The Quiet Orthodox Don.
𝄆 And it everywhere responded
To the call of freedom. 𝄇

II
With green the Don steppe,
With gold the furrows shine.
𝄆 And from the expanses, caressing the ear,
The call of freedom is heard. 𝄇

III
Don is calling its children
To the Sovereign Host Krug.
𝄆 It choosing an ataman
With the people's soul. 𝄇

IV
In the formidable time of battle,
In the memory of our grandfathers and fathers,
𝄆 It has become free again,
The people of the reborn Donians. 𝄇

V
Glory to Don, and now in our years,
In the memory of the free old times,
𝄆 In times of hardship, in honour of freedom,
Thy sons will defend them. 𝄇

Don Republic version
(July 1918)

I
It has shaken, it has stirred,
The Quiet Orthodox Don.
𝄆 His loud cry rang out:
It's calling the warriors! 𝄇

II
Hey, Yermak, the mighty Cossack!
Gather an army,
𝄆 Let it rush as a menacing cloud
At the enemy for the free land! 𝄇

III
For the fields, the meadows are native,
For the graves of the elderly,
𝄆 For the unearthly melodies
Cossack is ready to die. 𝄇

IV
Don't cry, don't cry, Cossak's wife!
Do you hear the horses neighing in the field?
𝄆 There's a dashing race,
The Cossacks are on march! 𝄇

V
You, dear mother,
Bless your son in battle…
𝄆 May your holy tear
Will burn anger in his blood. 𝄇

VI
Let the enemy will tremble
At the revenge of the Don knights…
𝄆 Let the Don wave splesh,
Glory to the braves. 𝄇
