= Donetsk Museum of History and Ethnography =

Museum in Donetsk, Rostov, Russia

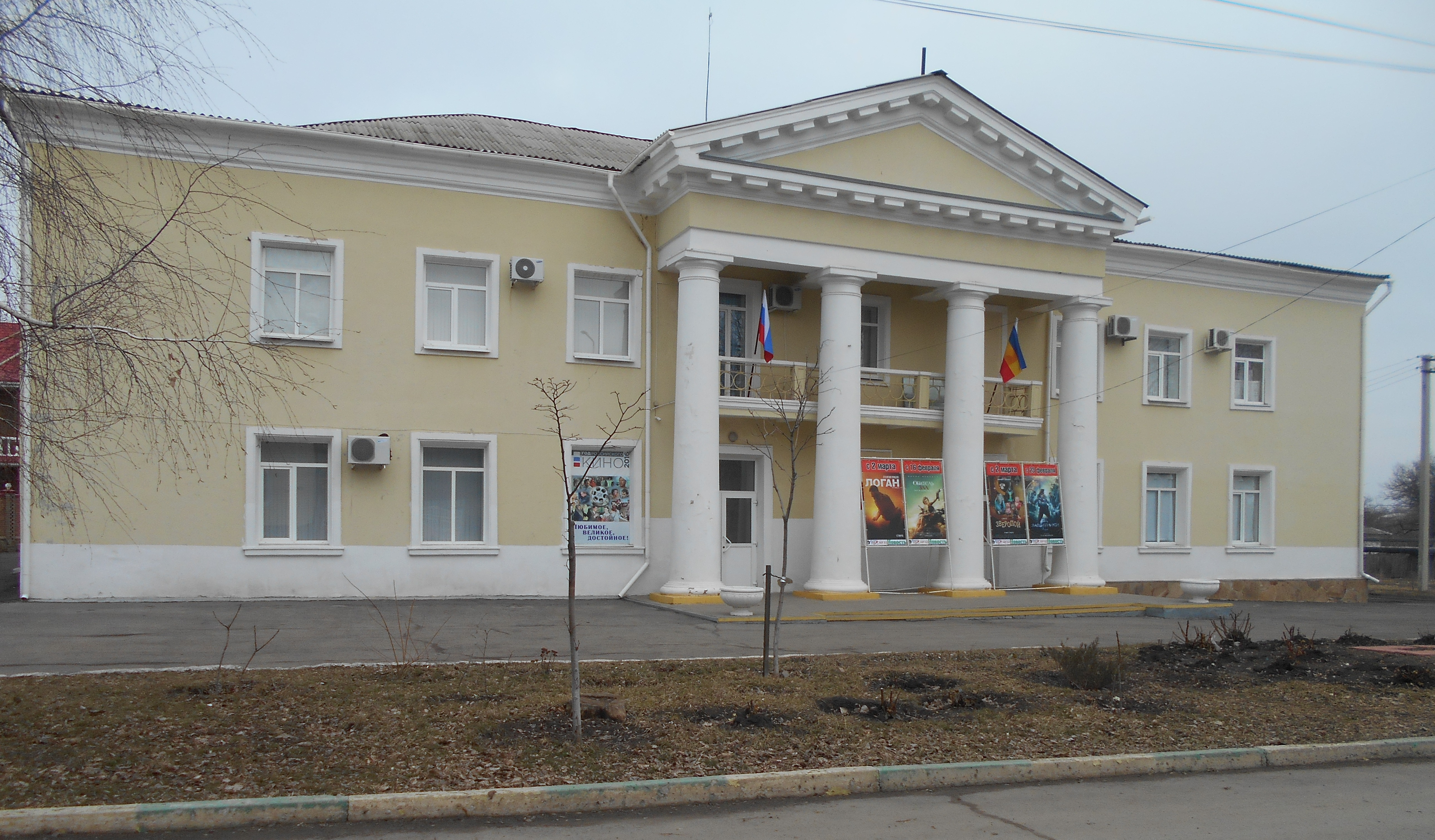
- View of Sholokhov's kuren (Cossack dwelling)
- Established: 2005
- Location: Donetsk, Rostov, Russia
- Coordinates: 48.336°N 39.9447°E

The Donetsk Museum of History and Ethnography is a museum in Donetsk, Rostov Oblast, Russia. It was opened in August 2005. It is devoted to the 50th anniversary of Donetsk. In 1955, It received its modern name in relation to the location on the Seversky Donets River.

The whole history of Donetsk is reflected in the museum. The museum consists of nine exposition halls, which contain ancient objects, photographs, documents, books, household items belonging to the Don Cossacks.
