= Dmitry Zhloba =

Soviet military commander (1887–1938)

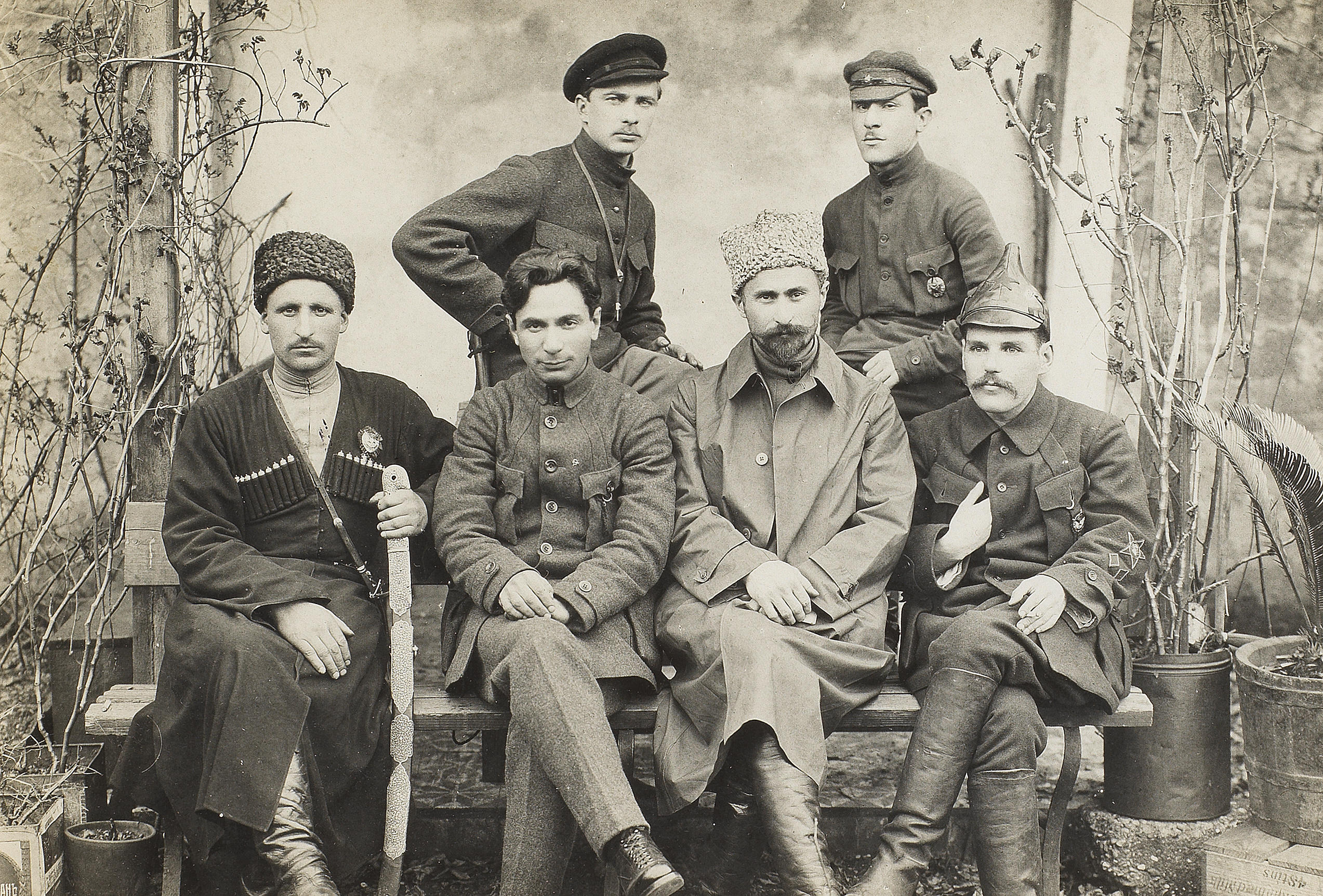
- Dmitry Zhloba, sitting on the left (1921)
- Born: June 3, 1887; Kiev, Russian Empire (now Kyiv, Ukraine)
- Died: June 10, 1938 (aged 51)
- Spouse: Darya Mikhailovna Prikazchikova
- Military career
- Commands: Red Guards; 1st Cavalry Corps; 18th Cavalry Division
- Conflicts: Ukrainian–Soviet War
- Awards: Orders of the Red Banner

Dmitry Petrovich Zhloba (Russian: Дмитрий Петрович Жлоба; Ukrainian: Дмитро Петрович Жлоба; June 3, 1887 – June 10, 1938) was a Soviet military commander who participated in the Russian Civil War.

He was born in Kiev, in Imperial Russia. During the Russian Revolution of 1905, he was a member of an armed workers' detachment in Nikolaev. In May 1916, he was arrested for participation in an anti-government strike and sent to the World War I front. At the time of the Bolshevik October Revolution in 1917, he was a member of the Moscow Soviet and commanded a Red Guard detachment against the Kremlin-based Junkers.

At the end of 1917, he was sent as a war commissar to the Donbass, where he organized a miners’ Red Guard unit that fought at Kiev and Rostov. He was assigned to the Caucasus Front of the Russian Civil War in May 1918.

During the Battle of Tsaritsyn, Zhloba's Steel Division attacked the rear of Pyotr Krasnov's Don Army, forcing it to retreat.

In 1919-20, he commanded a cavalry brigade and then the 1st Cavalry Corps operating against Denikin’s and Wrangel’s armies.

In February 1921, he led the 18th Cavalry Division which reinforced the 11th Soviet Red Army in the war against Georgia. During the March Batumi Operation in Georgia, he crossed a virtually impassable Goderdzi Pass in the Lesser Caucasus, to occupy Batumi for the Soviet government. For his successful campaigns, Zhloba was awarded two Orders of the Red Banner.

From 1922 he served in the North Caucasus until he was sacked and executed during Stalin's Great Purges in 1938. He was posthumously rehabilitated in 1956.

== Family ==
His wife, Darya Mikhailovna Prikazchikova (died in 1967); she had spent together with her husband the whole war. Two children were born in this marriage (in 1913 and 1914) — son Konstantin (died 1991) and daughter Lydia, which were arrested together with their mother, and released in 1956, lived a long life and had descendants.
