= Azovsky Nemetsky National District =

Azovsky Nemetsky National District Азовский немецкий национальный район (Russian)
- District
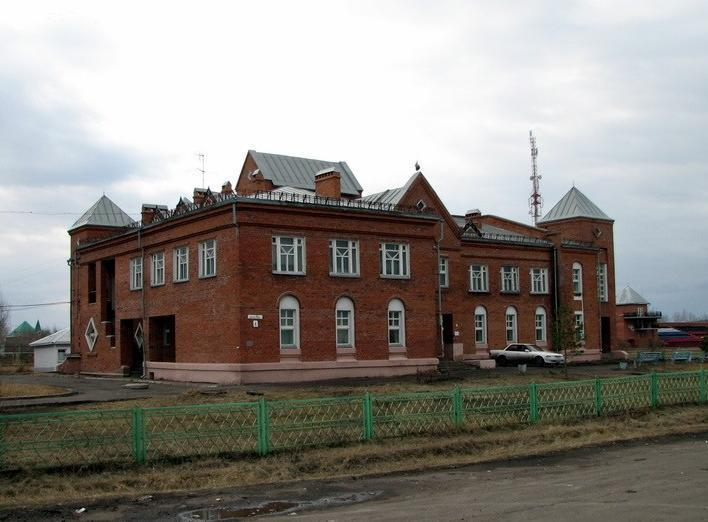
- Building in Azovo, the administrative center of Azovsky Nemetsky National District

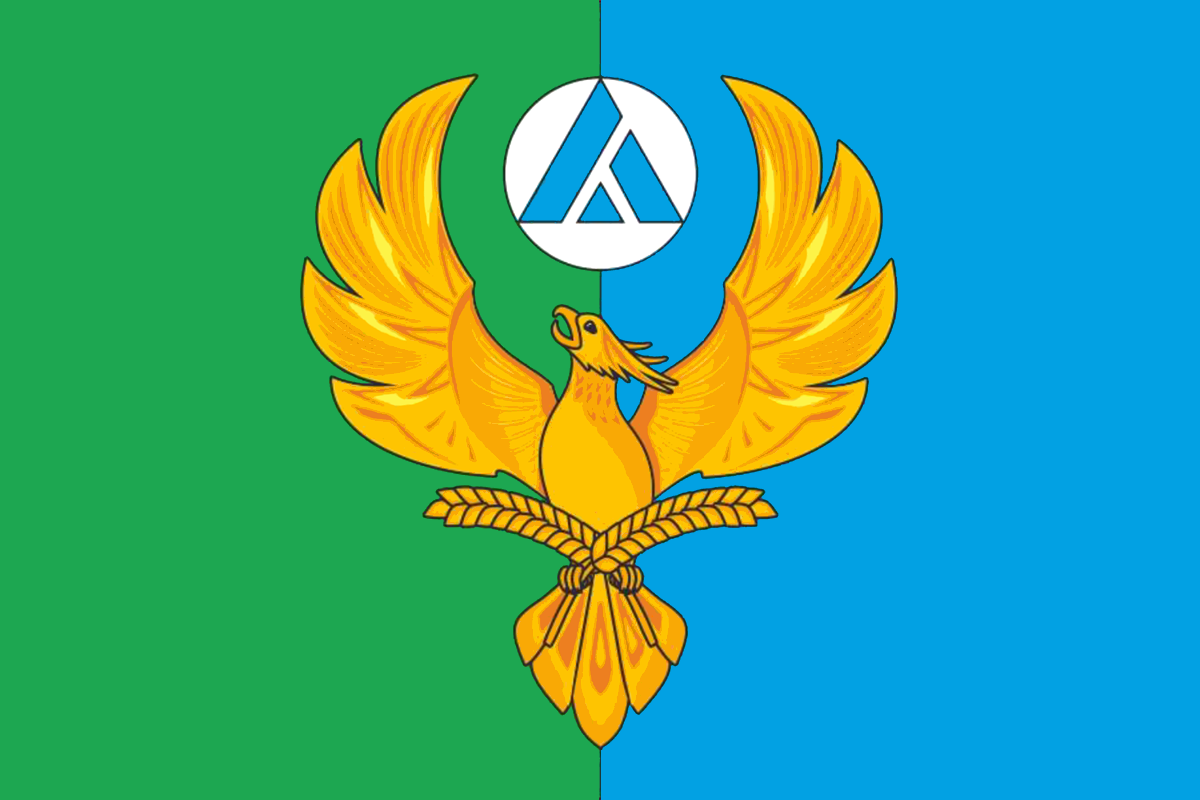
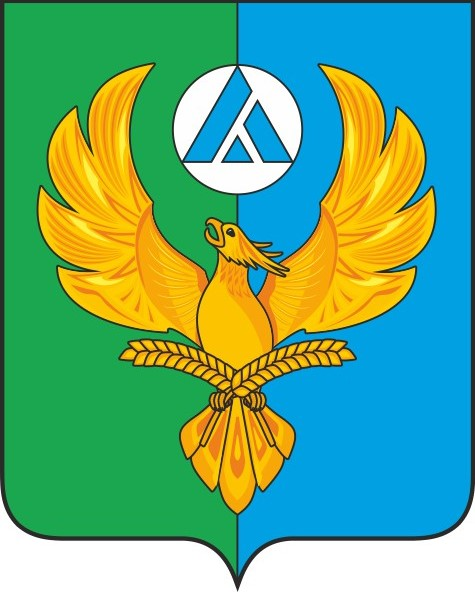
- Flag Coat of arms
- Location of Azovsky Nemetsky National District in Omsk Oblast
- Coordinates: 54°42′N 73°02′E
- Country: Russia
- Federal subject: Omsk Oblast
- Established: 17 February 1992
- Administrative center: Azovo

Area
  - Total: 1,400 km^{2} (540 sq mi)

Population (2010 Census)
  - Total: 22,925
  - Density: 16/km^{2} (42/sq mi)
  - Urban: 0%
  - Rural: 100%

Administrative structure
  - Administrative divisions: 8 rural okrug
  - Inhabited localities: 28 rural localities

Municipal structure
  - Municipally incorporated as: Azovsky Nemetsky National Municipal District
  - Municipal divisions: 0 urban settlements, 8 rural settlements
- Time zone: UTC+6 (MSK+3)
- OKTMO ID: 52601000
- Website: http://www.azov.omskportal.ru/

Azovsky Nemetsky National District (Russian: Азо́вский неме́цкий национа́льный райо́н, romanized: Azovskiy nemetskiy natsionalnyy rayon, lit. 'Azovo German National District'; German: Deutscher Nationalkreis Asowo) is an administrative and municipal district (raion), one of the thirty-two in Omsk Oblast, Russia. It is located in the south of the oblast. The area of the district is 1,400 square kilometers (540 sq mi). Its administrative center is the rural locality (a selo) of Azovo. In the Russian Census of 2010, the population was 22,925. The population of Azovo accounts for 26.2% of the district's total population.

== History ==
The first villages in what is now Azovsky Nemetsky National District were founded in 1893 by the Volga Germans.

== Politics ==
Heads of the district administration were Bruno Heinrich Reuters (1992-2010) and Viktor Sabelfeld (2010-present).

== Demographics ==
The population of the district as of January 1, 2007 was 22,246, of which 56% were Germans, 24% Russians, 8.3% Kazakhs, and 6.8% Ukrainians.

Being considered cultural heritage, and in order for the Azovsky Nemetsky National District to be a refuge for the dispersed and diminished Russlanddeutsche, the German language is officially endorsed, i.e., protected, supported and promoted.

== See also ==
- History of Germans in Russia and the Soviet Union
