= Azovo, Omsk Oblast =

Rural locality in Azovsky Nemetsky National District, Omsk Oblast, Russia

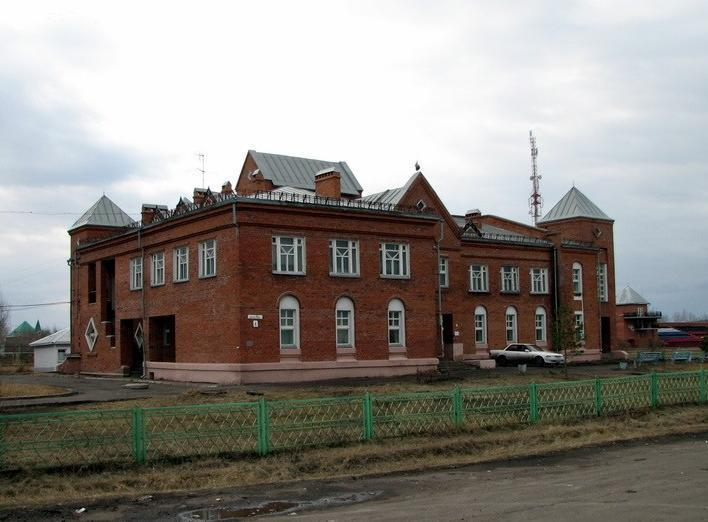
Manor house in Azovo

Flag of Azovo

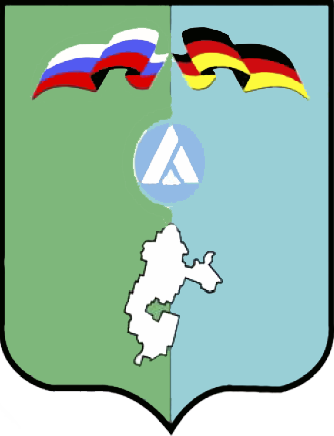
Coat of arms of Azovo

Azovo (Russian: Азово, German: Asowo) is a rural locality (a selo) and the administrative center of Azovsky Nemetsky National District of Omsk Oblast, Russia. Population: 5,997 (2010 census); 5,376 (2002 census);

== Population ==
The population of Azovo is mostly German-speaking. Half of its population is of German origin.

== Geography ==
The selo is located near the city of Omsk and the Kazakh border.
