= Don Soviet Republic =

1918 republic of the Russian SFSR

Coordinates: 49°59′N 36°13′E

Don Soviet Republic: Донская; советская республика
- 1918
- Flag

- Map of the territory claimed by Don Soviet Republic.
- Status: Republic within Russian SFSR
- Capital: Rostov-on-Don
- Common languages: Russian
- Government: Soviet Republic
- Chairman of the Sovnarkom
- Legislature: Soviet council
- Historical era: World War I
  - Established: 23 March 1918
  - Conquered by Don Cossacks: 8 May 1918
- Currency: Ruble
Preceded by	Succeeded by
Don Host Oblast	Don Republic
- Today part of: Ukraine; Russia

The Don Soviet Republic (Russian: Донская советская республика, romanized: Donskaya sovetskaya respublika) was a short-lived Soviet republic of the Russian Soviet Federative Socialist Republic that existed from March to May 1918.

Claiming the territory of the Don Host Oblast, the republic was proclaimed in March 1918 after the retreat of the White Army from the area. In May, after the revolt of the Don Cossacks and the German advance into the region as a result of the Treaty of Brest-Litovsk, the republic was overthrown and its leaders fled. The Don Cossacks' Don Republic took over the territory of the Don Soviet Republic.

== History ==
The Don Soviet Republic was proclaimed on 23 March 1918 with its capital at Rostov-on-Don, claiming the territory of the Don Host Oblast and part of Yekaterinoslav Governorate, after the Volunteer Army and Alexey Kaledin's Don Cossack forces retreated from the area. Between 9 and 14 April, a regional congress of soviets elected a Central Executive Committee (CEC) of 26 Bolsheviks and 24 Left Socialist Revolutionaries for the republic. The CEC in turn formed a Council of People's Commissars (Sovnarkom), which was led by Red Cossack Fyodor Podtyolkov. An Extraordinary Staff led by Sergo Ordzhonikidze was also established to organize the defense of the republic.

According to Peter Kenez, "Vladimir Antonov-Ovseenko, the leader of the Southern Forces, asked Lenin to send a representative to the Don, but Lenin had no one to send and instead asked Antonov-Ovseenko to be the chief representative of the Council of People's Commissars, the Sovnarkom. Antonov-Ovseenko could not go himself, but he sent Commissar Voitsekhovskii, who together with Sivers became the real ruler of the district. Voitsekhovskii nationalized the mines and factories, organized forced collectivization of food, extorted money from the bourgeoisie, and introduced a reign of terror. Terror was applied even against members of socialist parties and ordinary workers. The Red general Sivers ordered that anyone who had been a member of the Volunteer Army was to be executed. Dozens of officers were arrested and brutally murdered." This included the execution of Paul von Rennenkampf.

The Don Soviet Republic began to lose support as a result of its food requisitions and executions of suspected "counterrevolutionaries". In April, a general revolt of the Don Cossacks began, and from 1 May German troops also entered its territory, as a result of the Treaty of Brest-Litovsk. On 4 May, Mikhail Drozdovsky's force took Rostov-on-Don, which was then occupied by German troops, on 6 May. The leaders of the republic fled to Tsaritsyn, but Podtyolkov was captured and executed by the Don Cossacks. The Don Republic then took control of the territory of the Don Soviet Republic. The Don Soviet Republic, however, was not officially abolished by the Soviet government until September as its leaders had remained at Tsaritsyn.
