= Don Republic =

1918–1920 anti-Bolshevik republic in Eastern Europe

Coordinates: 47.4167°N 40.1°E

Don Republic (1918–19) Донская республика Almighty Don Host (1919–20) Всевеликое войско Донское
- 1918–1920
- Flag of the Don All-Russian Army Coat of arms
- Anthem: Всколыхнулся, взволновался православный Тихий Дон (It has shaken, has stirred the Orthodox quiet Don)
- Map of the Don Host Oblast (green)
- Capital: Novocherkassk
- Common languages: Russian, Ukrainian
- Religion: Eastern Orthodoxy
- Government: Parliamentary republic
- Ataman
  - 1918–1919: Pyotr Krasnov
  - 1919–1921: Afrikan Bogaevsky
- Legislature: Krug
- Historical era: World War I
  - Proclaimed: 18 May 1918
  - Disestablished: 1920
- Currency: Don Ruble
Preceded by	Succeeded by
Russian Soviet Federative Socialist Republic; Don Soviet Republic	Don Host Oblast; Donetsk Oblast

The Don Republic (Russian: Донская республика, romanized: Donskaya respublika), later known as the Almighty Don Host (Russian: Всевеликое войско Донское, romanized: Vsevelikoye voysko Donskoye), was an independent self-proclaimed anti-Bolshevik republic formed by the Armed Forces of South Russia on the territory of Don Cossacks against another self-proclaimed Don Soviet Republic. The Don Republic existed during the Russian Civil War after the collapse of the Russian Empire from 1918 to 1920.

== History ==
Basic laws of the Almighty Don Host.

In April 1918, after the liberation of Novocherkassk from control of the Don Soviet Republic, a Don Provisional Government was formed under Georgy Petrovich Yanov. On 11 May, the "circle for the Salvation of the Don" opened, which organized the anti-Bolshevik war. On 16 May, Pyotr Krasnov was elected Ataman. On 17 May, Krasnov presented his "Basic Laws of The All Great Don Host." Its 50 points included the inviolability of private property and abolished all laws promulgated since the abdication of Nicholas II. Krasnov also encouraged nationalism. According to Peter Kenez, "This new preoccupation with the glories of the past allowed the Cossacks to regard the struggle against their enemies as a war of national liberation, not merely one for defending their private interests against their fellow citizens."

The Don Republic claimed the territory of the Don region with the city of Novocherkassk as its capital. Administratively, the Don Republic was divided into ten okrugs, covering an area located in the Rostov and Volgograd Oblasts of RSFSR and in the Lugansk and Donetsk Oblasts of the neighboring Donetsk–Krivoy Rog Soviet Republic.

According to Peter Kenez, "Krasnov named Semenov, one of the army officers, 'governor' of Voronezh province (the part that had been liberated) and Colonel Manakin 'governor' of Saratov province."

The Don Republic ceased to exist after the Don Cossacks, who formed an essential part of the White Army, were defeated by the Red Army in the Russian Civil War. Many of the Russian Cossacks on Don were subjected to the Decossackization in 1919–1921, during the Soviet famine of 1932–33 and because of the repatriation of Cossacks after the Second World War by the United Kingdom to the Soviet Union, resulting in the eventual disappearance of the Don Cossacks' movement of resistance to the Soviet Union.

== Gallery ==
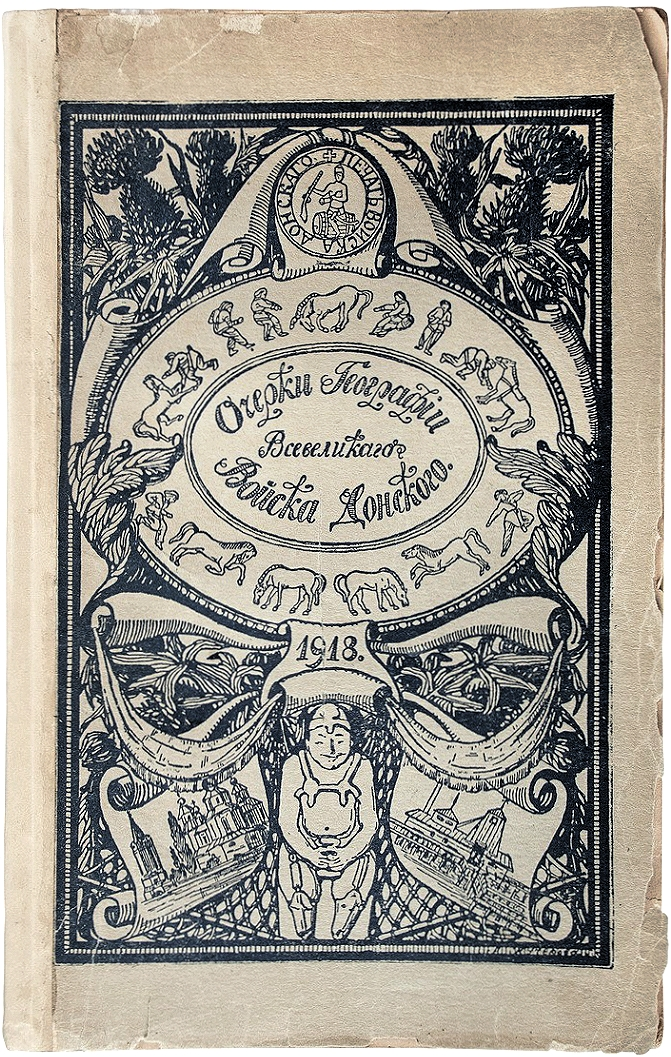

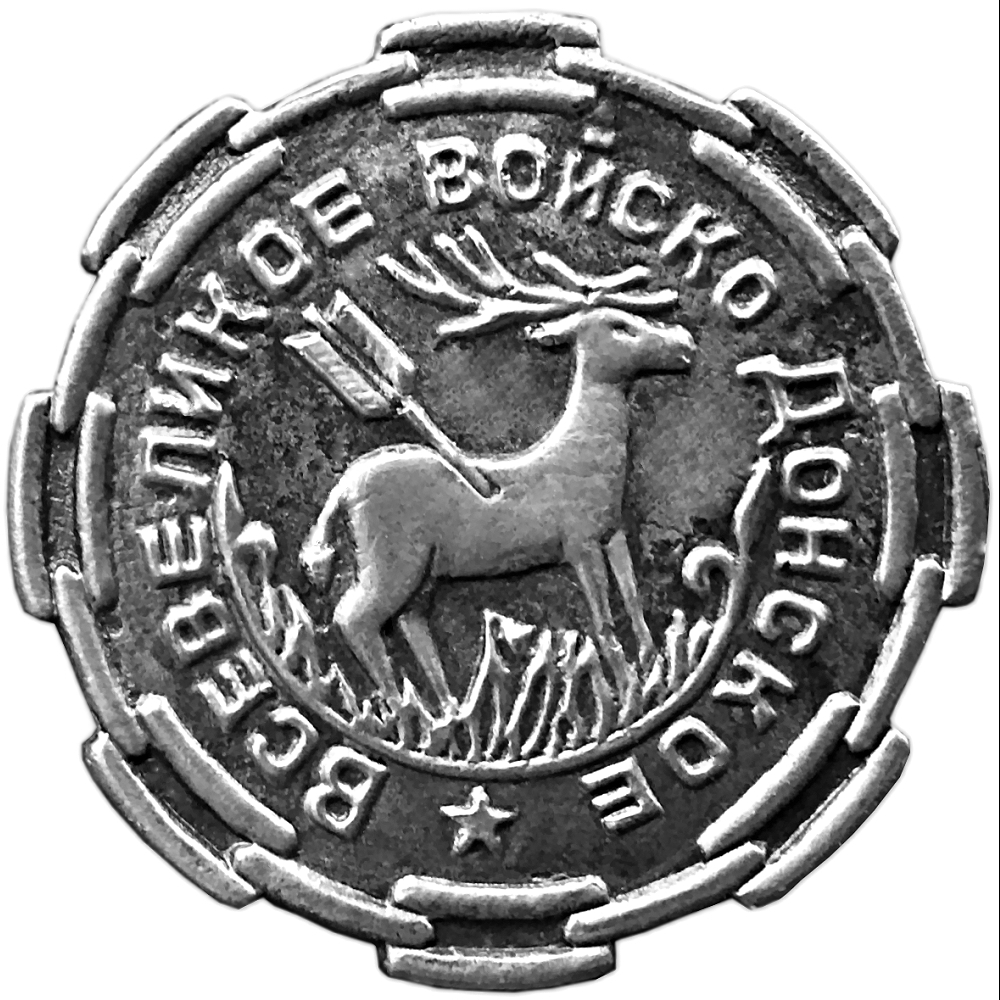
Medal of the Great Don Army: Defender of the Free Don.

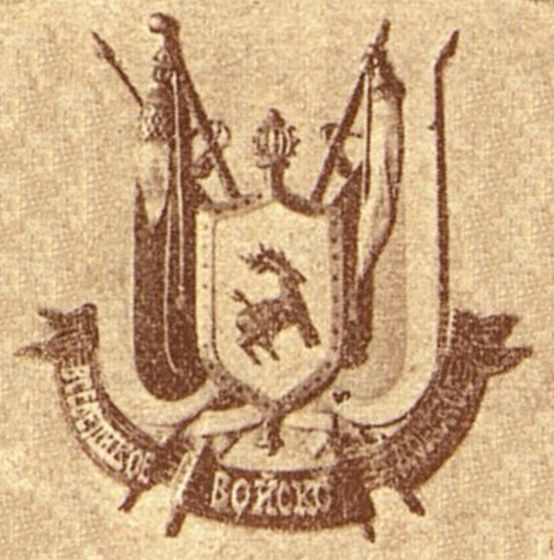
Coat of arms of the Almighty Don Host (1919)

== See also ==
- Don Army
- Don Host Oblast
- South Russia (1919–1920)
- Armed Forces of South Russia
- Kuban People's Republic, a government formed by the Kuban Cossacks in 1918
- Ukrainian People's Republic
- Post-Russian Empire states
