= Don Host Oblast =

1786–1920 unit of Russia

Coordinates: 47.4358°N 40.0986°E

Don Host Oblast Область Войска Донского
- Oblast of the Russian Empire
- 1786-1920
- Coat of arms

- Capital: Novocherkassk
- Area
- 162,888.57 km^{2} (62,891.63 sq mi)
- Population
- 1,712,898
- History
  - Established: 1786
  - Disestablished: 1920
Preceded by	Succeeded by
Yekaterinoslav Viceroyalty	Don Soviet Republic; Don Republic
- Today part of: Ukraine; Russia

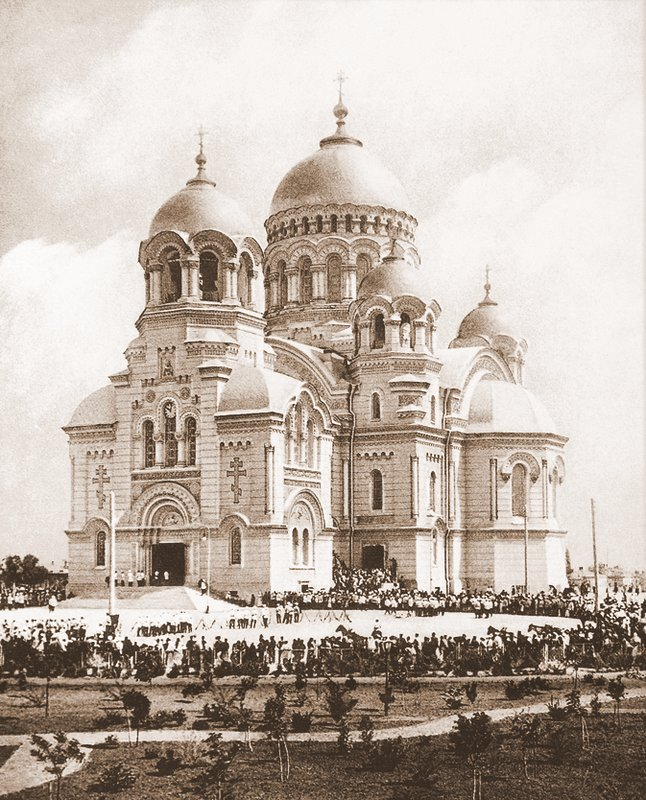
The Don Metropolitan Cathedral, Novocherkassk in 1905.

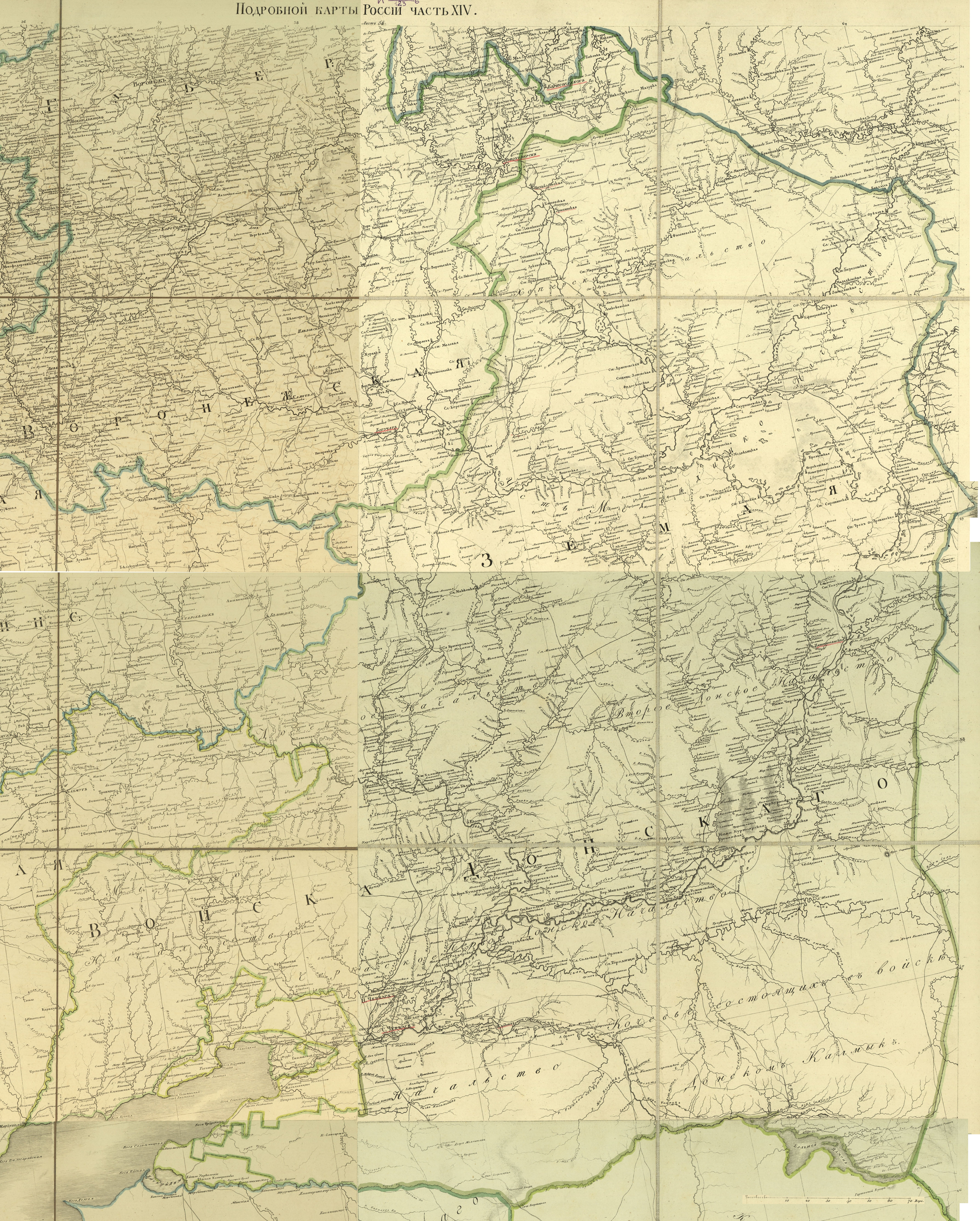
Map of 1816

Don Host Oblast (Note: Russian: Область Войска Донского, romanized: Oblast Voyska Donskogo; Ukrainian: Область Війська Донського, romanized: Oblast Viiska Donskoho, also known as Донщина, Donshchyna) was a province (oblast) of the Russian Empire which consisted of the territory of the Don Cossacks, coinciding approximately with present-day Rostov Oblast in Russia. Its administrative center was Cherkassk, and later Novocherkassk.

It comprised the areas where the Don Cossack Host settled in the Russian Empire. From 1786, the territory was officially named Don Host Land (Russian: Земля Войска Донского, romanized: Zemlya Voyska Donskogo), renamed Don Host Oblast in 1870.

During 1914, the oblast, with an area of 164,000 km², had about 3.9 million inhabitants. Of these, 55% (2.1 million) were Cossacks in possession of all the land; the remaining 45% of the population being townsfolk and agricultural guest labourers from other parts of Russia.

It was abolished in 1920; from the major part of it the Don Oblast of the RSFSR was created, which was incorporated into the North Caucasus Krai in 1924.

== Administrative divisions ==
The districts (okrugs) of the Don Host Oblast in 1897 were as follows:

District		Capital	Area	Population (1897 census)
Transliteration name	Russian Cyrillic	Capital	Area	Population (1897 census)
Donetsky	Донецкій	Kamenskaya	24,659.3 square versts (28,063.8 km^{2}; 10,835.5 mi^{2})	455,819
1st Don	1-й Донской	Konstantinovskaya	15,415.9 square versts (17,544.3 km^{2}; 6,773.9 mi^{2})	271,790
2nd Don	2-й Донской	Nizhne-Chirskaya	23,219.7 square versts (26,425.5 km^{2}; 10,202.9 mi^{2})	239,055
Rostovsky	Ростовскій	Rostov-on-Don	6,012 square versts (6,842 km^{2}; 2,642 mi^{2})	369,732
Salsky	Сальскій	Velikoknyazheskaya	18,961.0 square versts (21,578.8 km^{2}; 8,331.6 mi^{2})	76,297
Taganrogsky	Таганрогскій	Taganrog	12,229.4 square versts (13,917.8 km^{2}; 5,373.7 mi^{2})	412,995
Ust-Medveditsky	Усть-Медведицкій	Ust-Medveditskaya	18,082.6 square versts (20,579.1 km^{2}; 7,945.6 mi^{2})	246,830
Khopersky	Хоперскій	Uryupinskaya	15,861.4 square versts (18,051.3 km^{2}; 6,969.6 mi^{2})	251,498
Cherkassky	Черкасскій	Novocherkassk	9,750.3 square versts (11,096.4 km^{2}; 4,284.4 mi^{2})	240,222

== Demography ==
=== Language ===
- Population by mother tongue according to the Imperial census of 1897.

Language	Number	percentage (%)	males	females
Russian	1,712,898	66.8	858,601	854,297
Ukrainian	719,655	28.0	366,482	353,173
German	34,855	1.36	17,775	17,080
Kalmyk	32,283	1.25	16,689	15,594
Armenian	27,234	1.06	13,971	13,263
Jewish	15,121	0.59	7,448	7,673
Belarusian	9,158	0.35	5,033	4,125
Polish	3,316	0.13	1,971	1,345
Tatar	2,978	0.11	2,122	856
Greek	2,255	0.08	1,486	769
Gypsy	1,267	0.05	650	617
Other	3218	0.12	2092	1126
Total	2,564,238	100.0	1,294,320	1,269,918
