= Galbshtadt =

Galbshtadt Гальбштадт Halbstadt
- Village
- Location within Altai Krai Location within Russia
- Coordinates: 53°13′N 78°59′E
- Country: Russia
- Region: Altai Krai
- District: Nemetsky National District
- Time zone: UTC+7:00

Galbshtadt (Russian: Гальбштадт, German: Halbstadt) is a rural locality (a selo) and the administrative center of Galbshtadtsky Selsoviet and Nemetsky National District, Altai Krai, Russia. The population was 1750 as of 2016. There are 15 streets.

== Geography ==
The village is located within the Kulunda Plain, 430 km west of Barnaul.

== Ethnicity ==
The village is inhabited by Russians and Germans.

== See also ==
- Azovo, Omsk Oblast
