= Nemetsky National District =

German National District Немецкий национальный район (Russian)
- District
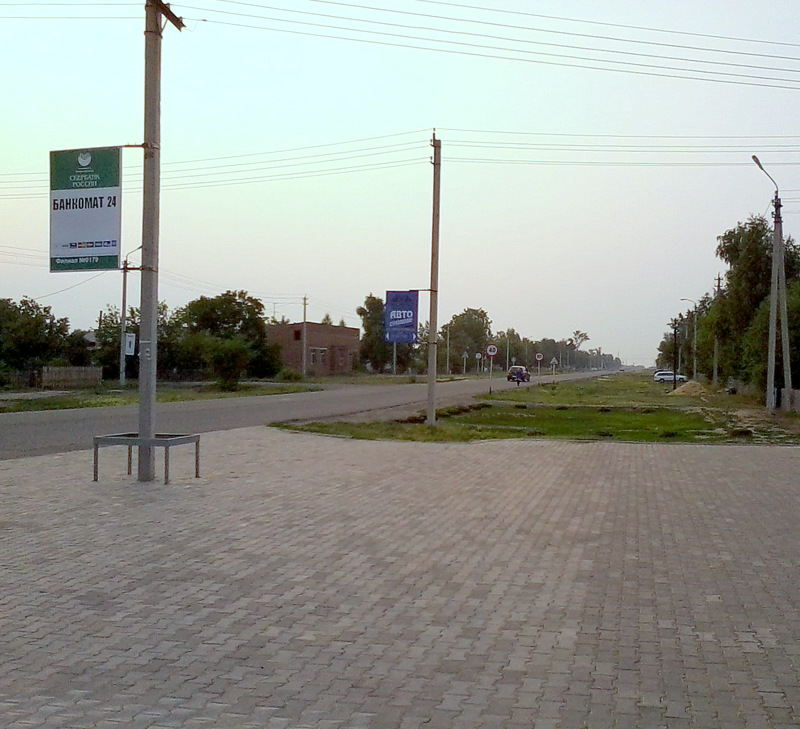
- Village Halbstadt. Nemetsky National District

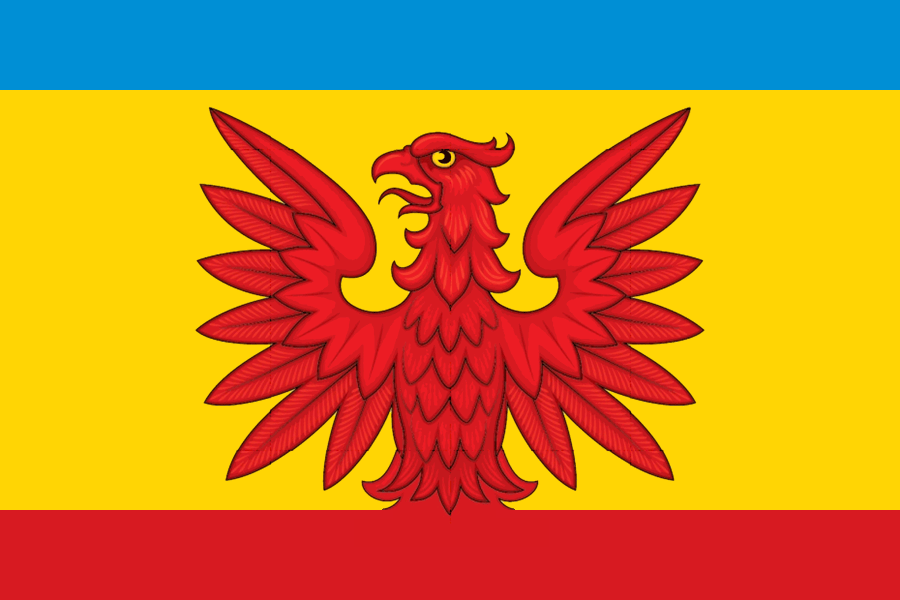
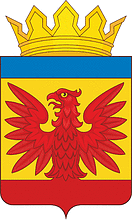
- Flag Coat of arms
- Location of Nemetsky National District in Altai Krai
- Coordinates: 53°13′30″N 78°59′00″E
- Country: Russia
- Federal subject: Altai Krai
- Established: July 4, 1927 (first), July 1, 1991 (second)
- Administrative center: Galbshtadt

Area
  - Total: 1,450 km^{2} (560 sq mi)

Population (2010 Census)
  - Total: 17,668
  - Density: 12.2/km^{2} (31.6/sq mi)
  - Urban: 0%
  - Rural: 100%

Administrative structure
  - Administrative divisions: 12 selsoviet
  - Inhabited localities: 16 rural localities

Municipal structure
  - Municipally incorporated as: Nemetsky National Municipal District
  - Municipal divisions: 0 urban settlements, 12 rural settlements
- Time zone: UTC+7 (MSK+4)
- OKTMO ID: 01660000
- Website: www.altairegion22.ru

German National District (Russian: Неме́цкий национа́льный райо́н, romanized: Nemetskiy natsional'nyy rayon; German: Deutscher Nationalrajon) is an administrative and municipal district (raion), one of the fifty-nine in Altai Krai, Russia. It is located in the northwest of the krai. The area of the district is 1,450 square kilometers (560 sq mi). Its administrative center is the rural locality (a selo) of Galbshtadt. Population: 17,668 (2010 census); 20,598 (2002 census). The population of Galbshtadt accounts for 9.9% of the district's total population.

== History ==
The official name of that area is "Deutscher Nationalkreis im Altai-Gebiet" (German national rayon in the Altai District). The district was established on July 4, 1927 and abolished on November 5, 1938 by Stalin. On July 4, 1991 it was resurrected by special orders of President Boris Yeltsin. Bonn and Moscow also agreed to the foundation of another German rayon: Asowo in the district of Omsk. Halbstadt, however, had already existed as a German village between 1927 and 1938, before Stalin put an end to it.

== Economy ==
After the fall of the Soviet Union, Germany actively aided the development of the economy and social services in the district. In the period between 1991 and 2006, the German government subsidized construction of 168 apartments (1-, 2-, 6- and 9-apartment houses) with a total area of 17,400 square metres (4.3 acres).

== Transportation ==
The "Pavlodar - Tomsk" highway (including the "Slavgorod - Kamen-na-Obi" section) runs through the district.
