= Soviet republic =

Republic formed of workers' councils

1936 map of the Soviet Union

A soviet republic (from Russian: советская республика, romanized: sovetskaya respublika), also called a council republic, conciliar republic or sovietic republic, is a republic in which the government is formed of soviets (workers' councils) and politics are based on soviet democracy. During the Revolutions of 1917–1923, various revolutionary workers' movements across Europe declared independence or otherwise formed governments as soviet republics.

Although the term is usually associated with the republics of the Soviet Union and the political system in which all state organs were answerable to the Supreme Soviet of the Soviet Union, this article discusses the term's wider usage.

== History ==
The earliest known examples of workers' councils on a smaller scale occurred during the Russian Revolution of 1905, including the Revolution in the Kingdom of Poland (1905–1907), which spread throughout the lands of the Russian Empire; early soviets were active particularly in Central Russia and Congress Poland, where workers took over factories, districts, and sometimes even entire towns or regions before the tsarist authorities reclaimed control.

Near the end of the First World War, soviet republics started appearing on a larger scale as short-lived communist revolutionary governments that were established in what had been the Russian Empire after the October Revolution and under its influence. These states included some such as the Lithuanian Soviet Socialist Republic and the Latvian Socialist Soviet Republic which won independence from Russia during the civil war period. Others such as the Ukrainian Soviet Republic and the Socialist Soviet Republic of Byelorussia later became union republics of the Soviet Union and are now independent states. Still others such as the Kuban Soviet Republic and the Bukharan People's Soviet Republic were absorbed into other polities and no longer formally exist under those names.

In the turmoil following World War I, the Russian example inspired the formation of Soviet republics in other areas of Europe including Hungary, Bavaria, Slovakia and Bremen. Soviets also appeared within towns throughout Poland, known as rady delegatów robotniczych (councils of workers' delegates), mostly throughout 1918 and 1919. One year later a Provisional Polish Revolutionary Committee was created under the patronage of Soviet Russia with the goal to establish a Soviet republic within Poland (it was later dissolved following the Red Army's defeat in the Polish–Soviet War). Short-lived Irish Soviets also briefly emerged during the Irish War of Independence, most notably the Limerick Soviet. Soviet republics, most notably the Chinese Soviet Republic (Jiangxi Soviet), later appeared in China during the early stages of the Chinese Civil War. Other than these cases, "soviet republic" typically refers to the administrative republics of the Soviet Union.

== List ==
=== Soviets ===
- Irish soviets (1919–1922) mainly in the province of Munster.
  - Limerick Soviet (15–27 April 1919) during a general strike against British military rule.
- Nghệ-Tĩnh Soviets

=== Soviet Republics ===
- Alsace-Lorraine Soviet Republic
- Bavarian Soviet Republic
- Bremen Soviet Republic
- Black Sea Soviet Republic
- Chinese Soviet Republic, also known as the "Jiangxi Soviet" (November 1931–September 1937) led by the Chinese Communist Party.
  - Hunan Soviet (ca. 1927) led by the Chinese Communist Party.
  - Jiangxi Soviet (1931–1934)
- Chyhyryn Soviet Republic
- Don Soviet Republic
- Donetsk–Krivoy Rog Soviet Republic
- Hungarian Soviet Republic (March–August 1919) led by the Hungarian Communist Party.
- Kuban Soviet Republic
- Kuban-Black Sea Soviet Republic
- Mughan Soviet Republic
- North Caucasian Soviet Republic
- Odessa Soviet Republic
- Slovak Soviet Republic (16 June–7 July 1919) directly supported by the Hungarian Soviet Republic.
- Ukrainian Soviet Republic (March–April 1918).
- Würzburg Soviet Republic
- Soviet Republic of Soldiers and Fortress-Builders of Naissaar (December 1917–February 1918) on an Estonian island in the Baltic Sea.
- Republic of Užice (Autumn 1941), a Partisan-governed military state during World War II.

=== Worker's Republics ===
- Paris Commune (18 March – 28 May 1871)
- Commune of the Working People of Estonia (November 1918–February 1919).
- Finnish Socialist Workers' Republic (January–April 1918) in the south of Finland only.
- Kazan Soviet Workers' and Peasants' Republic
- Shanghai Civil Government (22 March - 1 April 1927), violently dissolved on the orders Chiang Kai-Shek, resulting in the Chinese Civil War.
- Arbeiter- und Soldatenräte (Workers' and Soldiers' Councils) during the German Revolution of November 1918, including Bremen (January–February 1919), Braunschweig (November 1918 to February 1919), Würzburg (April 1919), Bavaria (April–May 1919) and Alsace (8–22 November 1918).

=== Soviet Socialist Republics ===
- Union of Soviet Socialist Republics or any of its two very distinct types of republics:
  - The larger union republics, representing the main ethnic groups of the Union and with the constitutional right to secede from it.
  - The smaller autonomous republics, located within some of the union republics and representing ethnic minorities. Typically, in regard to governance, autonomous republics were subordinate to the union republics they were located in.
- Bessarabian Soviet Socialist Republic
- Galician Soviet Socialist Republic (15 July–21 September 1920) in Soviet-occupied territory during the Polish–Soviet War.
- Lithuanian Soviet Socialist Republic (1918–1919)
- Polish Soviet Socialist Republic
  - East Polish Soviet Socialist Republic
- Taurida Soviet Socialist Republic

=== Socialist Soviet Republics ===
- Socialist Soviet Republic of Byelorussia (January–February 1919).
- Socialist Soviet Republic of Lithuania and Belorussia (February–August 1919).
- Amur Socialist Soviet Republic
- Latvian Socialist Soviet Republic (December 1918–January 1920).
- Persian Socialist Soviet Republic also known as the Soviet Republic of Gilan (June 1920–September 1921).

=== People's Soviet Republics ===
- Bukharan People's Soviet Republic, its name later changed to the Bukharan Soviet Socialist Republic (October 1920–February 1925).
- Khorezm People's Soviet Republic, later name: Khorezm Socialist Soviet Republic
- Ukrainian People's Republic of Soviets (December 1917–March 1918).

== See also ==
- People's republic
- Council communism
- Category:Early Soviet republics
- Irish soviets
- System of people's congress
