= Mykola Riabovil =

Ukrainian Kuban politician (1883–1919)

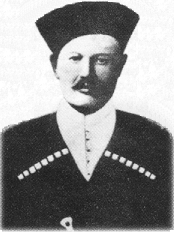
- Born: 17 December 1883; Dinskaya, Kuban Oblast, Russian Empire
- Died: 13 June 1919 (aged 36); Rostov-on-Don, Don Republic
- Cause of death: Murder
- Military career
- Allegiance: Russian Empire; Kuban People's Republic
- Service years: 1915-1919
- Conflicts: First World War Russian Civil War

Mykola Stepanovych Riabovil (Ukrainian: Мико́ла Степа́нович Рябові́л; Russian: Никола́й Степа́нович Рябово́л, romanized: Nikolay Stepanovich Ryabovol; 17 December 1883, Dinskaya, Kuban Oblast of the Russian Empire – 13 June 1919, at Rostov-on-Don) was a Ukrainian political figure in the Kuban. During the Russian Civil War he was the chairman of the Kuban Legislative Council and the chairman of the Kuban Military Council.

== Early years ==
Riabovil's Family is originally from the village of Dinska in the Kuban. Mykola Riabovil's grandfather was the foreman of the town for a long time, and his father worked as a town clerk for more than 35 years.

After graduating from the one-class school, Mykola entered the Katerynodar military school. At the end of the year, he taught in his native village. He organized the first folk performances in it.

Already in those years, Mykola came under the influence of the prominent public and political figure Stepan Erastov, the initiator of the creation of Ukrainian public, cooperative, educational and economic societies in the Kuban and the Ukrainian poet Mykola Voronyi, who moved to the Kuban, which made Mykola became a conscious Ukrainian. From 1902, he got close to Poltava seminarians Simon Petliura, Prokop Poniatenko and others, who engaged in anti-government work in the Kuban.

== Public career ==
In 1905-1907 he, studied at the Kyiv Polytechnic Institute, but due to participation in student performances, he stopped studying in the third year. This did not prevent him from making a quick career.

Since his father founded a credit cooperative in 1907, Mykola had to help him.

In 1909, the young Riabovil was elected to the organizing committee for the construction of the Kuban-Black Sea Railway. In 1912, the railroad charter was approved, and Riabovil was elected one of its directors.

In 1912, he organized the Kuban Union of Small Credit Institutions, which soon became a powerful organization, was elected chairman of the Union Council. At the same time, he headed the Kuban Cooperative Union.

== Head of the Kuban Rada ==
Read more: Kuban People's Republic

In 1915, he was mobilized into the Russian army and sent to study at a military engineering school, which he successfully graduated with the rank of ensign. He continued his service in the sapper unit in Finland, where he experienced the February Revolution. He was also a popular figure in the army, he was elected to the "Council of Soldiers' and Officers' Deputies."

After returning home, he took an active part in politics (in the Military Council) and public and political life (in the Regional Food Committee). He was elected the head of the Military Council .

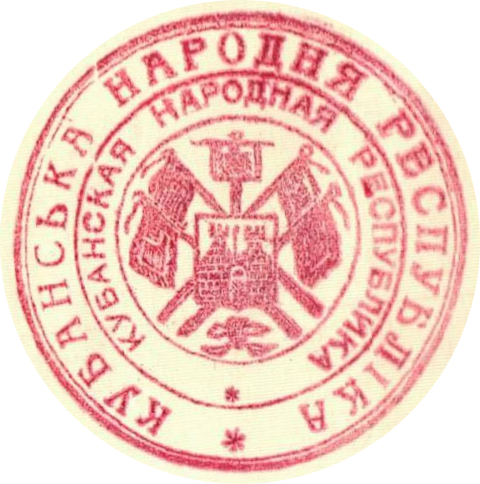
Stamp of the Kuban People's Republic

The Military Council, led by Riabovil, renamed itself the Kuban Regional Council, proclaimed Kuban a republic under the name "Kuban Region" in September 1917. The first Kuban constitution was also adopted at this session ("Temporary Provisions on the Highest Authorities in the Kuban Territory"). According to it, the Legislative Council became the highest legislative body, and the Kuban regional government and the military chieftain, who had presidential powers and the right to veto the adopted laws, became the executive power. Riabovil was elected as the head of the Kuban Legislative Council.

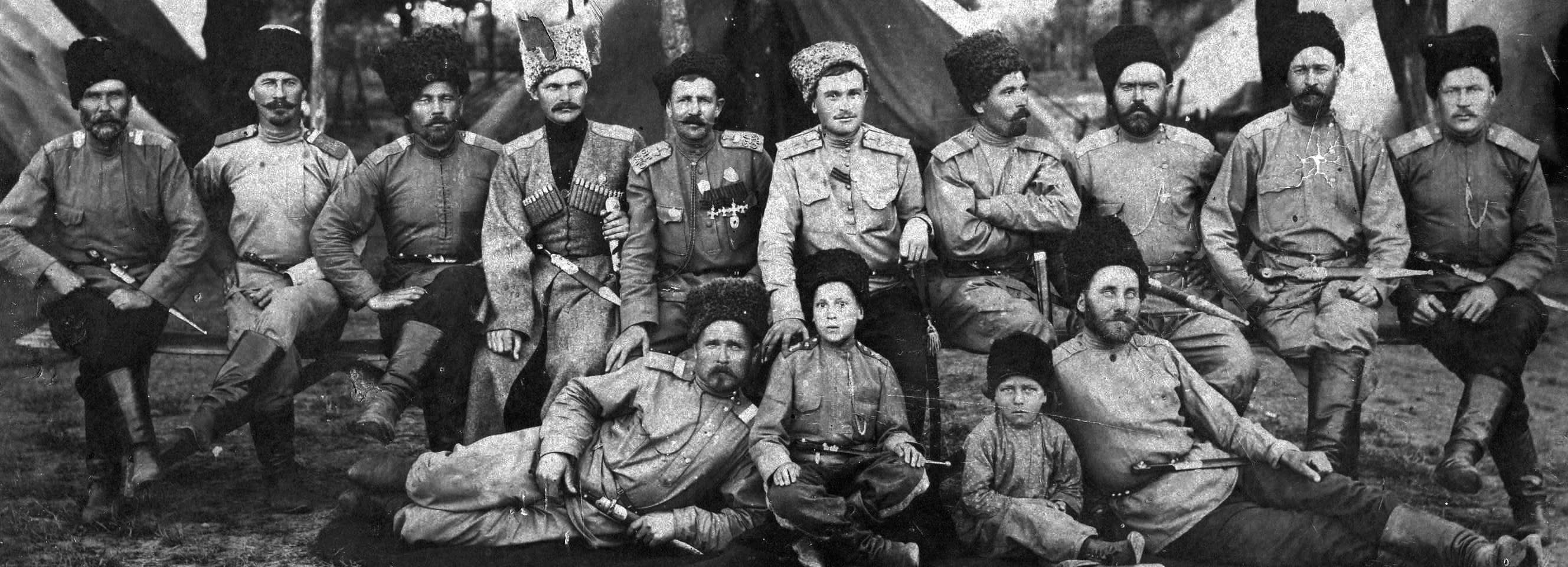
Kuban Cossacks during the Russian Civil War

He pursued a policy of the unity of the Kuban lands, the complete independence of the Kuban in the close relations to Ukraine. He was a supporter of the idea of the unity of Ukraine and the union of Ukrainian lands, he became one of the most popular Cossack politicians in the Kuban during the period of national liberation struggles 1917-1921. The idea of Kuban independence and the union of Kuban with Ukraine had two external opponents: the Bolsheviks, who stood for the world socialist revolution and considered Kuban to be a part of the RSFSR, and the forces that advocated the restoration of the Russian Empire (in particular, the Volunteer Army led by General Anton Denikin). In addition, there was an internal struggle in the Kuban - the idea of the independence of the Cossack nation and the state self-determination of all Cossack lands, not marked by a persistent Ukrainian color, had a significant impact. Riabovil actively supported the latter idea, when Ukrainian-Kuban ties were impossible, because it had general democratic features of development.

In the first periods of activity in the Council, Mykola Riabovil had close relations with Kuban Ukrainophiles Kindrat Bardizh, Fedor Shcherbina, Luka Bych and Stepan Manzhula.

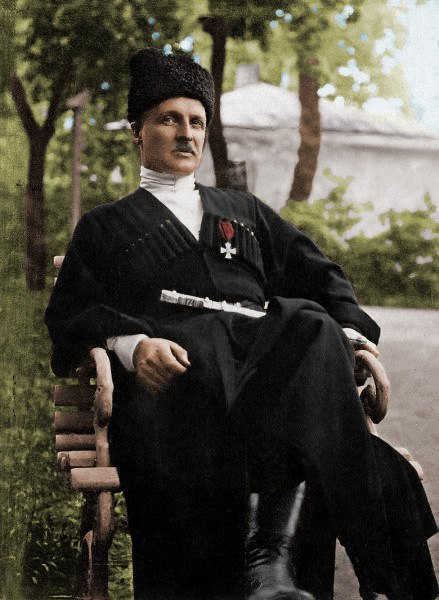
Portrait of Pavlo Skoropadsky

In May 1918, he led a delegation of the Legislative Council to Kyiv for negotiations with Hetman Pavlo Skoropadskyi on the establishment of interstate relations and cooperation in the fight against the Bolsheviks. The delegation in Kyiv was received kindly. Some of the representatives of the Ukrainian government spoke about the autonomy of the Kuban as part of Ukraine, others saw it in a federation with Ukraine. The Kuban representatives insisted on a federal connection.

With the liberation of the Kuban from the Bolsheviks, Denikin sought to establish his dictatorship there. Having failed to agree with the Council and the government on the changes he needed to the Kuban Constitution, he decided to become a dictator by convening the Extraordinary Kuban Council, at which he planned to get his protégé elected to the post of Council chairman. Therefore, Cossacks of Russian origin and "volunteers" campaigned against Riabovil, whom Denikin considered a dangerous enemy of Russia.

The council headed by Riabovil defended the sovereign rights of its republic. On December 4, 1918, at an extraordinary session of the Regional Council, a new Constitution was adopted, which changed the name of the Kuban People's Republic to "Kuban region".

=== Murder of Lukin ===
On October 1, 1919, Lukin was killed in Katerynodar. The murder took place a day after Lukin's return from Rostov, where he came with a report on the growth of the Ukrainian separatist movement in the Kuban and the arrival of a secret delegation from Petliura in Katerynodar. Kuban investigative bodies did not find the perpetrators.

== Commemoration ==
In 1990, at the celebration of the 500th anniversary of the formation of Zaporizhzhya Sich, a delegation of Kuban Cossacks brought a portrait of Riabovil with the inscription "Mykola Riabovil is a national hero of Ukraine. " since 2017 there is a Mykola Riabovil Street in Kyiv.

== See also ==
- Riabovil surname
