= Kuban People's Republic =

Self-proclaimed country during the Russian Civil War

Coordinates: 45°02′N 38°58′E

Kuban People's Republic Кубанская Народная Республика (Russian) Кубанська Народна Республiка (Ukrainian)
- 1918–1920
- Flag Coat of arms
- Anthem: Ты, Кубань, Ты наша Родина; Ти, Кубань, ти наша Батьківщина "You, Kuban, You Are Our Motherland"
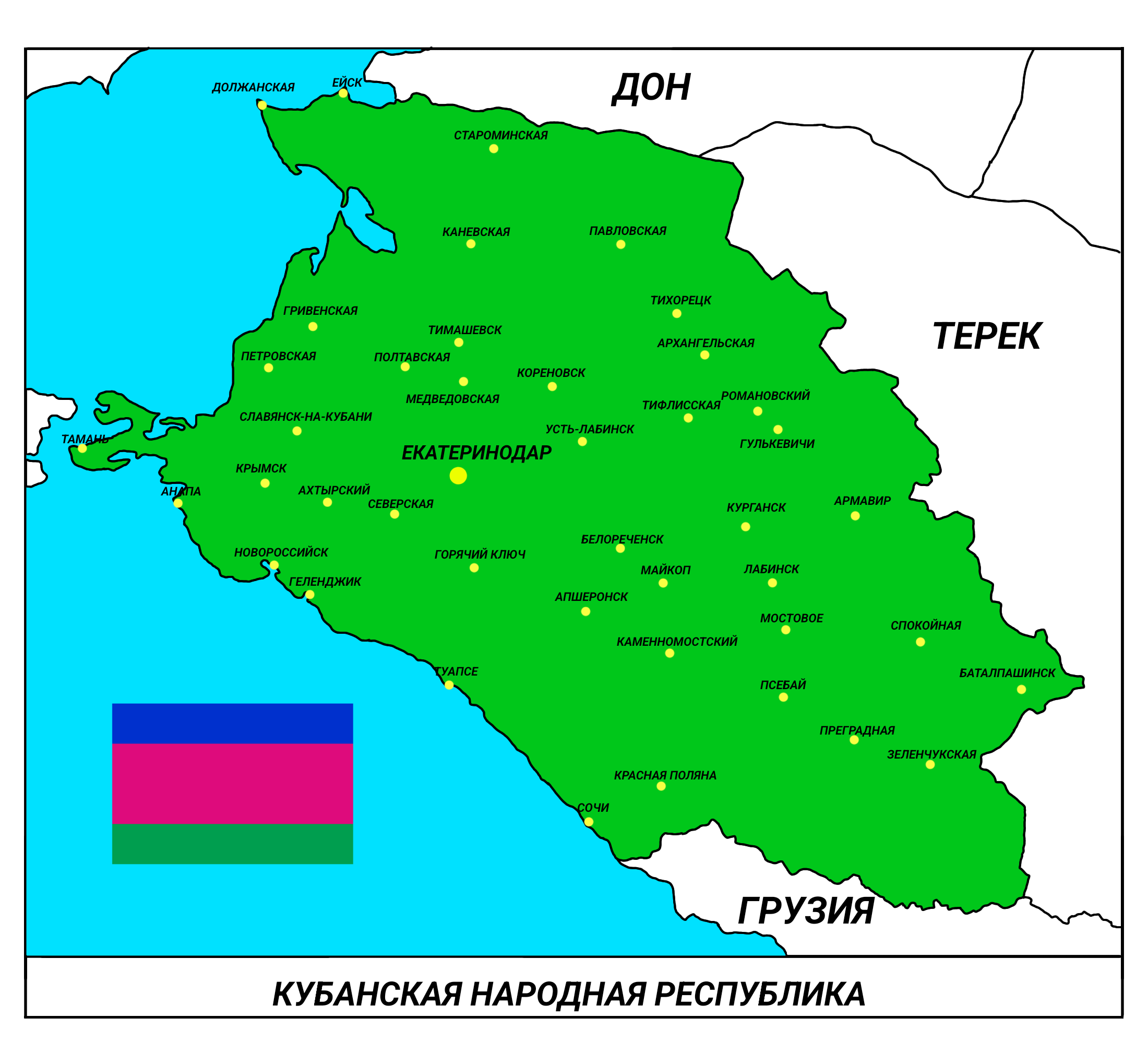
- Kuban People's Republic on map
- Capital: Yekaterinodar
- Common languages: Russian; Ukrainian
- Demonym: Kuban
- Government: Republic
- Ataman
  - 1918–1919: Alexander Filimonov
  - 1919: Nikolai Uspensky
  - 1920: Nikolai Bukretov
- Chairman of the Kuban Rada
  - 1917–1918: Luka Bych
  - 1918–1919: Philip Sushkov
  - 1919: Pavel Kurgansky
  - 1919–1920: Philip Sushkov
  - 1920: Vasily Ivanis
- Legislature: Kuban Rada
- History
  - Rada formed: March 1917
  - Republic proclaimed: 28 January 1918
  - Independence^{a}: 16 February 1918
  - Evicted and dissolved: 17 March 1920

Population
  - 1918: 3,500,000
- Currency: Ruble
Preceded by
Kuban oblast
Kuban Rada
Black Sea Governorate
Succeeded by
Russian Soviet Federative Socialist Republic
Kuban Soviet Republic
Black Sea Soviet Republic
- Today part of: Russia
- 1. Proclaimed by the Kuban Rada.

The Kuban People's Republic or Kuban National Republic (Note: Russian: Кубанская Народная Республика, romanized: Kubanskaya Narodnaya Respublika; Ukrainian: Кубанська Народна Республiка, romanized: Kubanska Narodna Respublika, abbreviated as KPR or KNR, Cyrillic: КНР) was an anti-Bolshevik state during the Russian Civil War, comprising the territory of the Kuban region in Russia.

The republic was proclaimed by the Kuban Rada on 28 January 1918 and declared its independence on 16 February. It included the entire territory of the former Kuban Oblast of the Russian Empire. During its brief independence, it unsuccessfully sought union with the Ukrainian People's Republic. The Kuban People's Republic was de facto occupied by the forces of Anton Denikin on 6 November 1919, before being fully occupied and annexed by the Soviets in the spring of 1920.

== History ==
=== Background ===
During the Russian Empire, the region of the Kuban was a Cossack territory. Like many similar provinces, its demographics constituted several differences from ordinary Russian governorates (guberniyas). The western regions belonged to the descendants of the Black Sea Cossack Host from Ukraine in 1792. The southern and eastern regions were made from the Caucasus Line Cossack Host, descendants of the Don Cossacks.

The Kuban Cossacks were formed to guard the Russian borders against the Mountain peoples they fought in the Caucasus War (1817–1864). Kuban Cossacks sent large contingents to fight alongside the Imperial Russian Army in many wars and formed the Tsar's personal bodyguard. In return for such loyalty, they lived free from taxes in a semi-independent way, with various privileges. The military nature of their lifestyle was mirrored in the administration of the region, where stanitsa settlements had much more autonomy than traditional Russian villages, electing a local Ataman (commander). The notion promoted by the government in the 19th century was that the Cossack Hosts had a special and unique bond with the Emperor and were personally loyal to him rather than Russia.

However, during the reforms of Tsar Alexander II, the pacified Kuban Oblast was heavily invested in and extensive peasant migrants from Russian, Armenian and Ukrainian provinces migrated to cultivate the land. The question of land ownership caused extensive friction between the peasants and the Cossacks, and often resulted in the latter's action to ensure its ownership. The Cossacks called the non-Cossack peoples living beside them inogorodyne ("outlanders"), a rather disparaging and insulting term.

=== February Revolution ===
Following 1917's February Revolution in Petrograd, the Russian Provisional Government continued fighting in the increasingly unpopular First World War. As a result, the Russian Army began to collapse. Kuban Cossack units deserted the front lines and returned home to protect their homelands from a threatened Turkish invasion.

During the Russian Empire, the Kuban was directly administered by an appointed Ataman (Nakaznoy Ataman) directly by the Tsar, usually a skilled non-Cossack general. The notion that the Cossack Hosts were personally loyal to the emperor rather than Russia meant that with the end of the monarchy in March 1917 that many Cossacks felt that they had no more loyalty to Russia. With the sovereign's abdication, the Kuban governing council, the Kuban Rada (parliament) in March 1917 proclaimed itself as the sole administration body with intentions to create a military government that would retain control of the Kuban, and on June 17 of that year proclaimed the Kuban People's Republic.

=== Independent Kuban National Republic ===
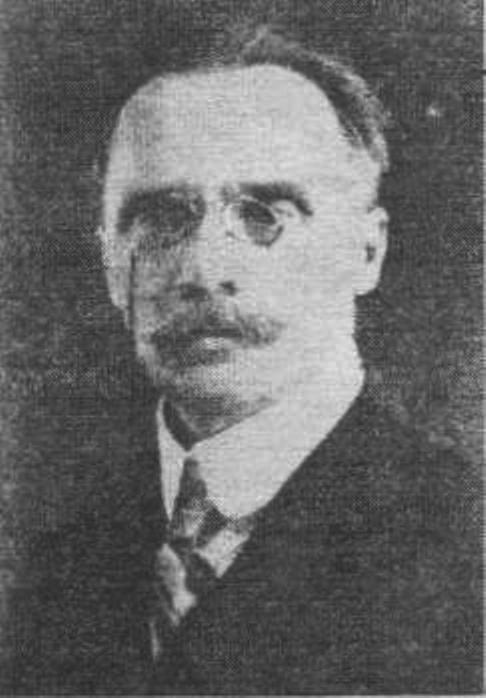
Luka Bych, the First Chairman of the Kuban People's Republic

From 30 April through 3 May 1917, a Cossack meeting took place in Yekaterinodar. It formed a Cossack government – the Kuban Military Council – electing Mykola Riabovil as its head.

With the October Revolution, the people of the Kuban found themselves divided. The numerous non-Cossack peasants were influenced by the Bolsheviks, proclaiming a Kuban Soviet Republic, which dispersed the council. However, on 16 February 1918, the Kuban Rada proclaimed the independence of the Kuban People's Republic from Bolshevik Russia. A few days after the closing of the sessions, the members of the Council voted for a resolution to join a federal structure with Ukraine (under its conservative Skoropadsky government).

In March 1918, after Lavr Kornilov's successful offensive, the Kuban Rada was re-established and placed itself under his authority. The Cossacks, formerly loyal to the Russian Empire, supported the White movement. Yet after the early successes of Kornilov's Volunteer Army, which rid the Kuban of the Bolsheviks, the front lines moved north into the Don territory.

This affected the importance of the Rada, and in June 1918 friction began to grow between the head of the leadership and the Cossacks. In particular, the main focal point was between the Chernomortsy and the Lineitsy. The former, disappointed with ineffective attempts of different authorities, pursued a policy of attaining full independence for the Kuban. However, the Lineitsy continued to believe in a re-created Russian state.

=== Russian Civil War ===
As the populace was already discontent with past struggles over land, the idea of a future Cossack state was unsuitable to many. Anton Ivanovich Denikin grew increasingly dissatisfied with an increasingly isolated Rada. The final sparks came when the Rada first turned towards Ukraine to enter a federal union with Hetman Pavlo Skoropadsky, and after its downfall, entered into a similar union with the Democratic Republic of Georgia, whilst its foreign envoys in France proclaimed independence from Russia. Some Cossacks left the government, and others defected to the Red Army.

The Kuban National Republic included the Kuban Oblast, Stavropol Oblast, Terek, Dagestan and Black Sea Governorate. 4 December 1918 at the special session of the Council where the 2nd Constitution was proclaimed, the Kuban National Republic was renamed Kubanskiy krai. On 15 December 1918, the Kuban Cossacks elected as their field ataman Vyacheslav Naumenko, a man known to be against Cossack separatism. Until he was forced to resign on 15 September 1919 under the pressure from the separatists, Naumenko did his best to ensure that the Kuban Host co-operated with the Volunteer Army as the Red Army.

In December 1918, the Rada sent a delegation headed by First Chairman Luka Bych to the 1919 Paris Peace Conference. By April the delegation put forward its requests for international help for the Kuban as an independent state to be defended from Bolshevism and announced its break from Denikin and refusal to further cooperate in the White Movement. None of this satisfied the Triple Entente. The Kuban People's Republic was, however, de jure recognized by the Ukrainian People's Republic, Azerbaijan Democratic Republic the German Empire, the Ottoman Empire, the Democratic Republic of Georgia, and the Mountainous Republic of the Northern Caucasus.

Denikin, learning of this "back-stabbing" on 6 November 1919, ordered the Rada building to be surrounded, and with the help of Ataman Alexander Filimonov arrested ten of the Rada's members, including its premiere Pavel Kurgansky. Alexey Kulabukhov, a member of the delegation to the Paris Peace Conference, was publicly hanged for treason. Most Cossacks joined Denikin and fought in the ranks of the Armed Forces of the Russian South, mainly in the Kuban army. In December 1919, after Denikin's defeat, it had become clear that the Bolsheviks would overrun the Kuban, and some of the separatist-minded groups managed to restore the Rada authorities and to break away from the Volunteer Army, either to fight the Bolsheviks in alliance with other independence-striving governments such as the Ukrainian People's Republic and the Democratic Republic of Georgia or to liberate Ukraine from Pilsudsky's invasion in alliance with the Reds. However, by early 1920 the Red Army took most of the Kuban, and both the Rada and the white armies were evicted. But the last ataman, his government and many of his Cossacks served in the army of Wrangel and then retreated from Crimea to Turkey.

== Legacy ==
Both Soviet and later contemporary Russian historians viewed the decision of the Kuban People's Republic to break with the White Movement as a deceitful "back-stabbing" at a critical moment during the Russian Civil War. The act is perceived as one of the important contributions to the ultimate Bolshevik victory.

Some Ukrainian historians argue that the Kuban People's Republic was an attempt by the Kuban Cossacks to unite with Ukraine, citing the shifting alliances of the Rada. The last premier of the Republic, Vasil Ivanis, argued that had Pavlo Skoropadsky acted more decisively, and sent a UNR division led by General Native to the Kuban, Ukraine would have become the main nexus of the Anti-Bolshevik movement. Ivanis states that with the aid of the Central Powers they could have easily reclaimed all of Russia, given that Aleksander Kolchak would have acted in the same time frame in the East.

== Modern developments ==
In the summer-autumn of 1991 several Cossack republics were proclaimed on the territory of the former Kuban People's Republic: Armavirska, Zelenchuksk-Urupska and Batalpashinska, and the last two merged into the Cossack Upper Kuban. Of these, only the Zelenchuksko-Urupskaya Cossack Republic, which lasted six months, had actual power. The reason for the proclamation of the republics in Karachay-Cherkessia was a referendum held by Cossack activists in the summer of 1991: 64.8% of whose participants were in favour of creating autonomy.

== See also ==
- Bibliography of the Russian Revolution and Civil War
- Outline of the Russian Revolution and Civil War
- Index of articles related to the Russian Revolution and Civil War
- The "Russian" Civil Wars, 1916–1926: Ten Years That Shook the World
- Russia in Flames: War, Revolution, Civil War, 1914–1921
- Russia in Revolution: An Empire in Crisis, 1890 to 1928
- Russia: Revolution and Civil War, 1917—1921
- The Russian Revolution: A New History
- Kuban Cossacks
- Kuban Soviet Republic
- Kuban-Black Sea Soviet Republic
- Don Republic
