= Alexander Filimonov =

Alexander Filimonov may refer to:

- Alexander Filimonov (Cossack) (1866–1948), ataman of the Kuban People's Republic
- Aleksandr Filimonov (born 1973), association football goalkeeper
