= Viktor Pokrovsky =

Russian lieutenant general (1889–1920)

Viktor Leonidovich Pokrovsky
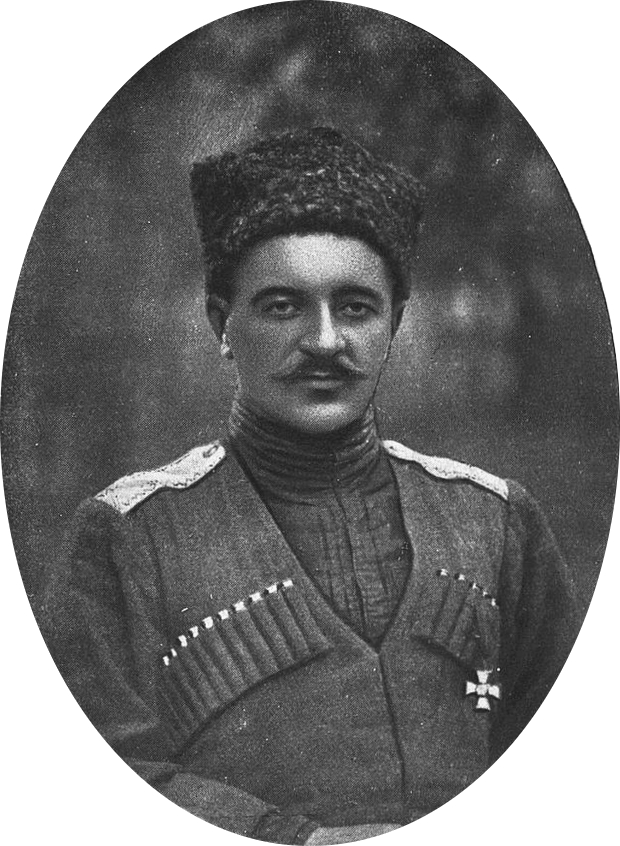
- Born: September 14, 1889; Russian Empire
- Died: November 9, 1922 (aged 33)
- Allegiance: Russian Empire; White movement
- Branch: Imperial Russian Air Service; White Army (Kuban Army)
- Service years: World War I Russian Civil War
- Rank: Lieutenant general
- Known for: Leader of the White Army during the Russian Civil War
- Awards: Order of St. George

Viktor Leonidovich Pokrovsky (Russian: Виктор Леонидович Покровский; 14 September 1889 – 9 November 1922) was a Russian lieutenant general and one of the leaders of the anti-communist, counterrevolutionary White Army during the Russian Civil War.

== Biography ==
Viktor Pokrovsky graduated from Pavlovsk Army Cadet School and the Sevastopol Aviation Military School. He served in the Russian army during the First World War as a pilot and was awarded the Order of St. George for bravery.

=== Russian Civil War ===
In December 1917, after the October Revolution, the Kuban Ataman Filimonov supported the formation of a volunteer unit under the command of Pokrovsky. On 4 and 6 February, his men won two victories over the Bolsheviks at Enem and Georgie-Afipskaia, killing the Bolshevik leaders Iakovlev and Seradze. The Kuban Rada promoted him to the rank of colonel after a hero's welcome in Ekaterinodar. On 27 February, he was made Commander-in-Chief of the Kuban Army. However, on 13 March, the army of 3,000 soldiers, accompanied by 2,000 civilians, was forced to abandon Ekaterinodar. By the end of March, Pokrovsky combined his forces with the Volunteer Army during the Ice March.

Pokrovsky's men played a key role in the capture of Tsaritsyn and Kamyshin from the Bolshevik forces in the summer of 1919. Many in the White movement, including military officers, complained about Pokrovsky's penchant to hang prisoners. In September 1918, he had ordered the massacre of 2,500 people near Mayakop, including many Red Army prisoners.

=== Exile ===
In April 1920, he emigrated from Crimea because General Wrangel did not appoint him to any key positions at his headquarters. In emigration, he settled in Bulgaria and continued anti-Soviet activities. On 9 November 1922, he was killed by the Bulgarian police while resisting arrest in a murder investigation.

== See also ==
- White movement
- Volunteer Army
- Russian Civil War
