= Riabovil =

Riabovil, Ukrainian: Рябовіл, Russian: Рябовол, Belarusian: Рабавол, literally Spotted Ox, a Ukrainian surname.

== Other spellings ==
Variations of the surname include Ryabovil, Ryabovol, Riabovol, Riabowol, Rjabovil, Rjabovol. According to the official Ukrainian-English transliteration rules Рябовіл must be spelt as Riabovil.

== Derivatives ==
- Riabovolenko, Ukrainian: Рябоволенко, i.e. Riabovil's son
- Riabovolyk, Ukrainian: Рябоволик, i.e. Little Riabovil, or Little Spotted Ox
- Riabovoliv, Ukrainian: Рябоволів, or Riabovolov, Russian: Рябоволов, i.e. Riabovil's

== Famous people ==
- Mykola Riabovil (1883—1919), the Chairman of the Parliament of Kuban People's Republic (1918—1919)
- Ivan Riabovil, S. Riabovil — pen names of Ivan Bahrianyi (1906—1963), a Ukrainian writer
- Karl Riabowol, a Canadian cancer researcher
