= Luka Bych =

Russian politician (1870–1945)

- Лука Быч
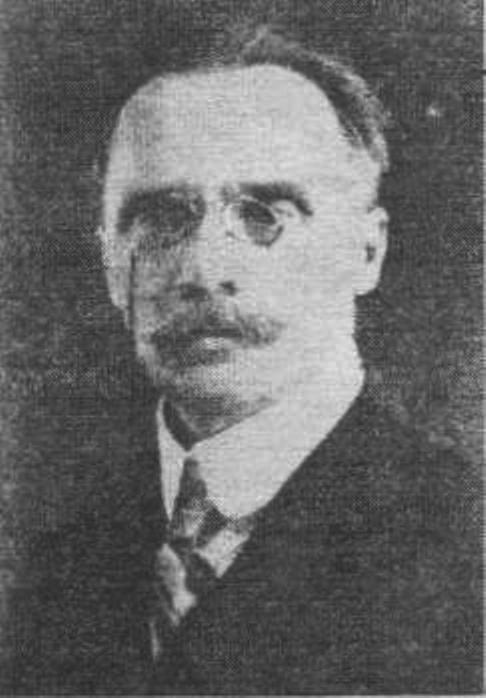

1st Chairman of the Kuban Rada
- In office November 11, 1917 – March 14, 1918
- Preceded by: Office established
- Succeeded by: Philip Sushkov

Mayor of Baku
- In office 1912–1917

Personal details
- Born: Luka Lavrentievich Bych; November 30, 1870 Pavlovskaya, Krasnodar Krai, Russian Empire
- Died: January 12, 1945 (aged 74) Prague, Czechoslovakia
- Education: Moscow University

Luka Lavrentievich Bych (Russian: Лука Лаврентьевич Быч; November 30, 1870 – January 12, 1945) was a Russian politician and professor who served as the first Chairman of the Kuban Rada for the Kuban People's Republic from 1917 to 1918. He also served as the Mayor of Baku from 1912 to 1917.

== Early life and education ==
Luka Lavrentievich Bych was born on November 30, 1870 in Pavlovskaya, Krasnodar Krai in a family from Cossacks decent. He studied law faculty and graduated from the Moscow University.

== Career ==
Bych was first elected as the Secretary of the Novorossiysk City Council. In 1900, He was transported to a private service at the Eastern Volga and Caspian Sea Transport Society, where he was appointed as the Director of the Baku Branch. He was also elected as a member of the Baku City Duma in the same year.

In 1912, he was elected as the Mayor of Baku, where he served for five years. He helped reduce the water shortage within the city while also fixing the water supply in the city.

=== Chairman of the Kuban Rada ===
During the February Revolution, Bych was appointed as the Chief of Supplies for the Caucasian Army. After the collapse of the Caucasian Front, he returned to Kuban and formed the Kuban People's Republic, and was declared as the first chairman in November 1917, and served until March 1918.

== Personal life ==
Bych went into exile in Poděbrady, Czechoslovakia, where he became a professor in Faculty of Economics of the Ukrainian Economic Academy in 1922. He wrote numerous scientific works and textbooks. Afterwards, he went on to live in Prague, where he passed away on January 12, 1944. He was 74.
