= Amur Socialist Soviet Republic =

Former Soviet Republic

Amur Socialist Soviet Republic Амурская социалистическая советская республика
- Flag

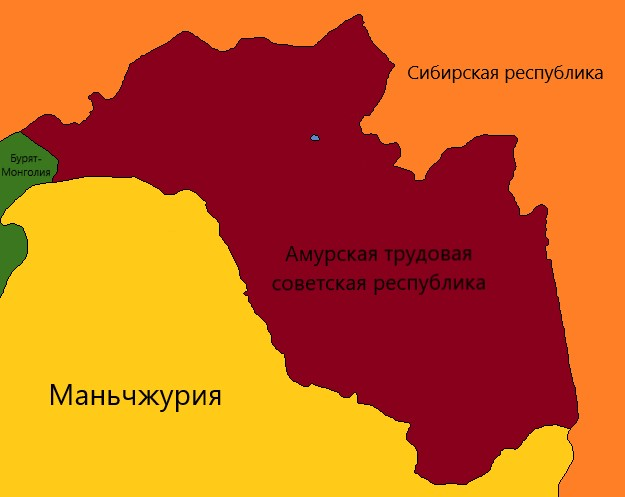
- Status: Republic
- Capital: Blagoveshchensk
- Common languages: Russian
- Religion: Secular state
- Government: Soviet republic
- History
  - Declaration of Independence: April 10, 1918
  - Invasion of the interventionist troops and the White Guards formations. The Amur Labour Socialist Republic ceased to exist: September 18, 1918
Preceded by	Succeeded by
Amur Oblast	Amur Cossack Host; Russian State
- Today part of: Amur Oblast

The Amur Soviet Socialist Republic (also Amur Labour Socialist Republic, or Amur Socialist Federative Republic) (April 10 – September 18, 1918) was a territorial entity proclaimed on the territory of the Amur Oblast in 1918, formally part of the Russian Socialist Federative Soviet Republic. The capital was the city of Blagoveshchensk.

== Formation ==
With the outbreak of the Civil War, a large–scale struggle for power broke out in Blagoveshchensk between the Blagoveshchensk Council, the City Duma and the Regional Zemstvo Council.

On January 26, 1918, the Blagoveshchensk Council of Workers' and Soldiers' Deputies announced that they had taken power in the city into their own hands, and already on February 25, 1918, the 4th Regional Congress of Peasant Delegates held in Blagoveshchensk and the Blagoveshchensk Council announced the transfer of power in the Amur Region to the Soviets. Zemstvos and city self–government were abolished.

From March 6 to 13, 1918, the Zemstvo Council and the regional Cossack government organized a rebellion against the Soviet government, led by Ataman Gamov, but were brutally suppressed, which ensured the restoration of the power of the Soviets.

On April 10, 1918, at the 5th Peasant Congress, a resolution was adopted on the organization of the Amur Labour Socialist Republic – an integral part of the Russian Socialist Federative Soviet Republic.

== Authorities and leaders ==
An executive committee of 30 members was elected for general management, Fyodor Mukhin became the chairman of the executive committee.

Factory teams were created for enterprises. At the general city meeting of representatives of such collectives, a city committee was created, and on a regional scale, general management was in the hands of the Council of the People's Economy. Mikhail Delvig was elected Chairman of the Council of the People's Economy.

Also, a revolutionary military headquarters, a control commission, a commission for combating counter–revolution, and a revolutionary tribunal were created in the republic.

== Liquidation ==
Throughout the existence of the republic, the remnants of the anti–Bolshevik forces continued to fight against Soviet power from Chinese territory. In connection with the overthrow of Soviet power in Vladivostok on June 29, the Ussuri Front arose, and the republic had to send military units there, which greatly weakened its military strength. In August, anti–Soviet activity intensified within the republic. The uprisings of the Cossacks and peasants of the villages coastal to the Amur began. On September 18, 1918, troops of interventionists and White Guard formations invaded Blagoveshchensk and the territory of the region. Soviet detachments retreated to the northern regions of the Amur Oblast and continued to resist. The Amur Labour Socialist Republic ceased to exist.
