= Würzburg Soviet Republic =

German soviet republic of April 1919

Würzburg Soviet Republic Würzburger Räterepublik (German)
- 1919
- Flag Red star
- Status: Unrecognized state
- Capital: Würzburg
- Government: Soviet republic
- Historical era: Weimar Republic
  - Established: 7 April 1919
  - Disestablished: 9 April 1919
Preceded by	Succeeded by
Weimar Republic	Weimar Republic
- Today part of: Germany

The Würzburg Soviet Republic (German: Würzburger Räterepublik) was an unrecognized, short-lived state organized under council communism in Würzburg, Germany in April 1919. It had little support among the local citizenry or political parties and was quickly put down by a unit of the Bavarian Army.

== Background ==
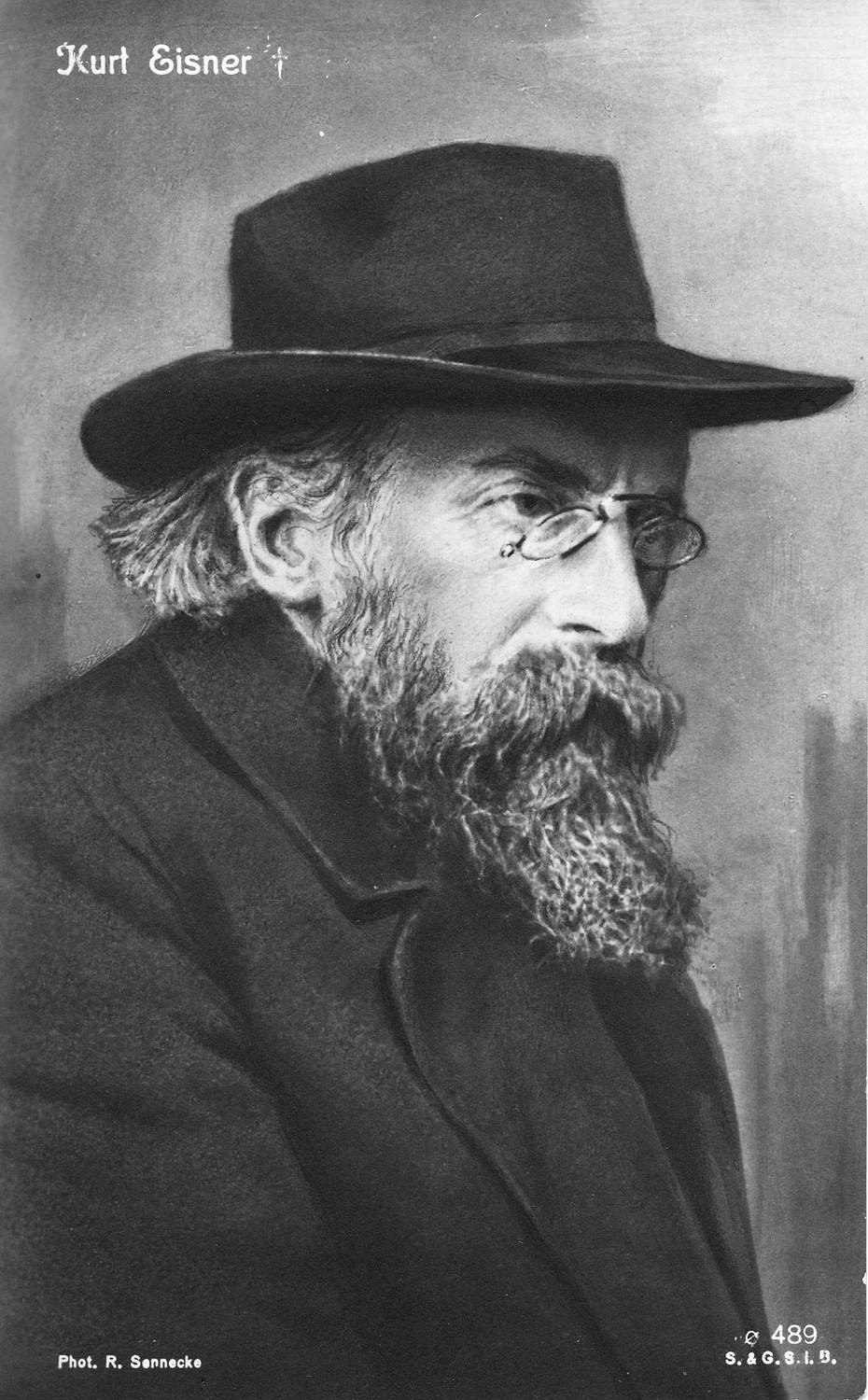
Kurt Eisner in 1919

On 3 November 1918, at the beginning of the November Revolution that overthrew Germany's Hohenzollern monarchy in the final days of World War I, Fritz Endres, a member of the state parliament of Würzburg and later minister of state, publicly called for the establishment of a republic. On 8 November the royal House of Wittelsbach was toppled in Munich and the socialist People's State of Bavaria proclaimed by Kurt Eisner of the Independent Social Democratic Party (USPD). The next day, the annexation of Würzburg to the People's State was announced in front of thousands of people on the square facing the Würzburg Residence. Later, a Workers' and Soldiers' Council was formed, supported mainly by representatives of the Majority Social Democratic Party (MSPD) – the main body of the SPD after the antiwar and more leftist USPD split from it in 1917 – which included Fritz Endres. Würzburg's magistrate and the government of Lower Franconia, where Würzburg is located, had to accept the changed situation. As the economic situation in Würzburg deteriorated in early 1919, supporters of left-wing radicalism gained influence. The attempt by the Würzburg Soldiers' Council of the Second Royal Bavarian Army Corps to proclaim a soviet republic shortly after the assassination of Bavarian Minister President Kurt Eisner on 21 February 1919 failed due to poor preparation and a lack of support from the rest of the garrison.

== Establishment ==
In order to prepare for the establishment of a soviet republic in line with the corresponding efforts in Munich that led to the formation of the Bavarian Soviet Republic on 12 April 1919, members of the USPD and the Communist Party of Germany (KPD) founded the twelve-member Revolutionary Action Committee (RAA) on 26 March 1919. On the night of 6–7 April, the committee, meeting in the Würzburg Residence, decided to impose a state of siege and press censorship and to call a general strike. Early in the morning of 7 April, Anton Waibel of the KPD issued a strike call and at 4:00 p.m. proclaimed a soviet republic from in front of the Neumünster church.

=== Resistance ===
The Soviet Republic found little support among the people of Würzburg. The bourgeoisie, the Majority Social Democrats, the soldiers' councils and the government administration all rejected it. On the evening of 7 April the Würzburg MSPD announced:

Today's members' meeting of the Social Democratic Union declares its opposition to the Soviet Republic in the People's State of Bavaria for both political and economic reasons. The meeting calls on all members of the Social Democratic Union not to accept any government or administrative positions in order to place full responsibility on those who made it impossible for the previous government to continue its business in an orderly fashion.

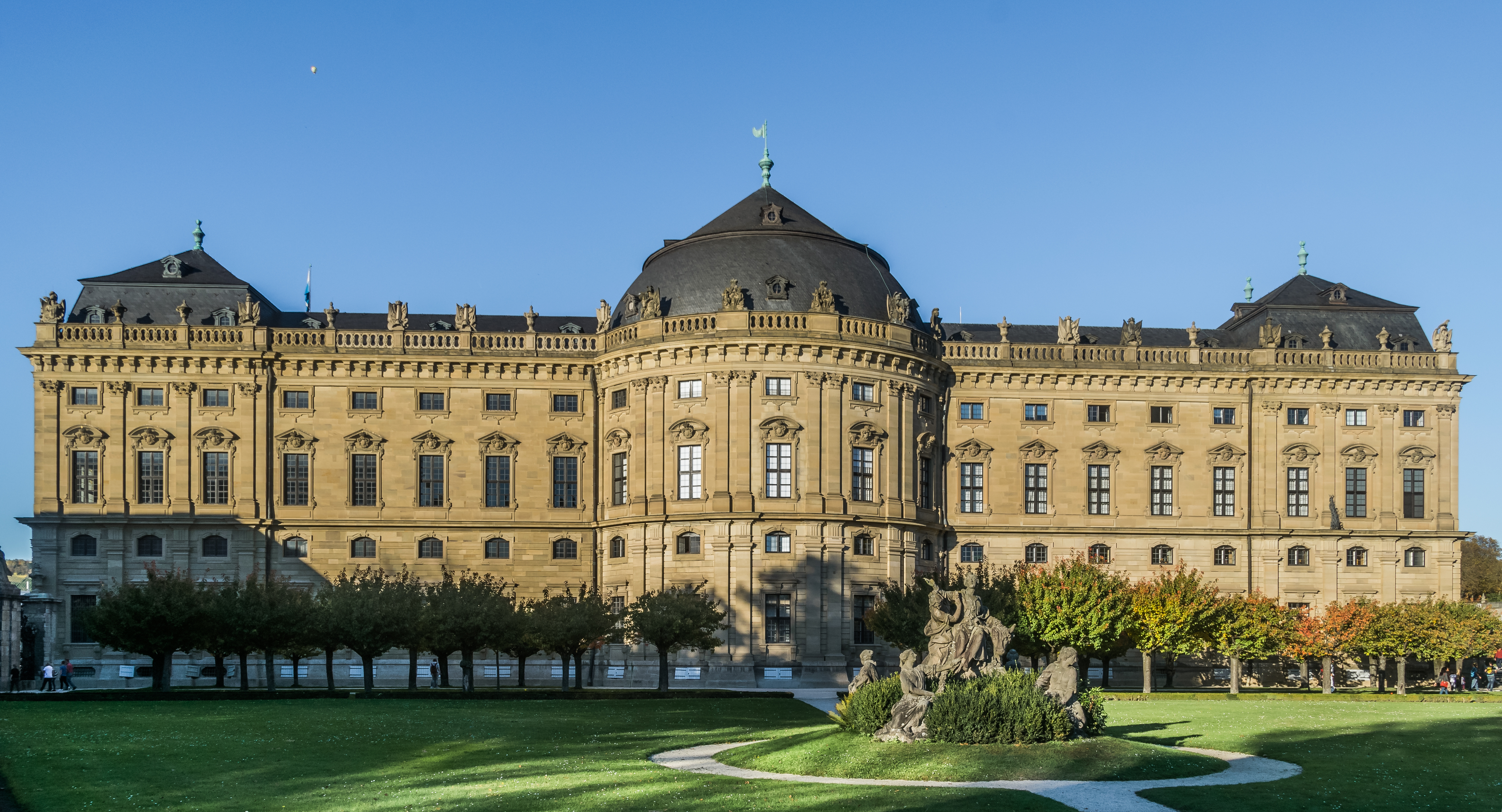
Würzburg Residence

The revolutionaries nevertheless tried to keep the Soviet Republic alive. They occupied strategically important buildings and during the night of 8–9 April held 16 hostages captive in the Würzburg Residence but treated them well. Among the hostages was Second Mayor of Würzburg Bernhard Brand. For their part, the opponents of the Soviet took two members of the Revolutionary Action Committee into their power. On 9 April a united front of the MSPD, the Bavarian People's Party, monarchists and magistrates called for a "citizens' strike". Würzburgers of all classes laid down their work in protest. The 2nd Artillery Regiment of the Bavarian Army attacked the council supporters. After a two-hour battle for the Residence and the main train station during which 29 people were killed, the Würzburg Soviet Republic was overthrown. The Marienberg Fortress in Würzburg also fell into the hands of the council opponents. The decisive factor in the rapid victory that brought joy to most Würzburgers was thought to be the confusion among the Soviet's leaders in the Residence.

Action was subsequently taken against other towns in Lower Franconia that had withdrawn their allegiance to Bavarian Minister President Johannes Hoffmann. Under pressure from a Würzburg volunteer contingent, the supporters of the soviet republics in Aschaffenburg, Schweinfurt and Lohr am Main capitulated within 12 hours.

=== Aftermath ===
Würzburg's mayor Andreas Grieser, who had already denied the legitimacy of the Soviet Republic on 8 April, said on 11 April:

Since Wednesday afternoon Würzburg has been a free city again. Before that, we were under a reign of violence and terror for several days. The revolutionary action committee in the Residence united a true selection of fanatical communists, deluded fanatics and incompetent chatterers. Its supports were the hand grenades and machine guns in the hands of seduced, incited or bribed soldiers. The invisible goal of the tyranny was the destruction of the new form of government, the shattering of the national economy and the overthrow of its entire structure. Würzburg liberated itself, Würzburg will liberate Franconia, Franconia will liberate Bavaria. The enterprise of 9 April was a unanimous commitment to pure democracy.

The Würzburg People's Court sentenced the leaders in June 1919 to many years in prison. Anton Waibel – described by his opponents as an "ill-mannered, presumptuous, spiteful, sadistic screamer" – was sentenced to 15 years. After a year and a half, he managed to escape. From 1939 to 1945 he was a prisoner in the Buchenwald concentration camp. Freed by the Americans, he died in West Berlin in 1969 at the age of 79.

== See also ==
- Bavarian Soviet Republic
- Alsace-Lorraine Soviet Republic
- Bremen Soviet Republic
