= Terek Soviet Republic =

Terek Soviet Republic Терская Советская Республика
- Soviet Republic of Russian SFSR
- 1918-1919
- Flag

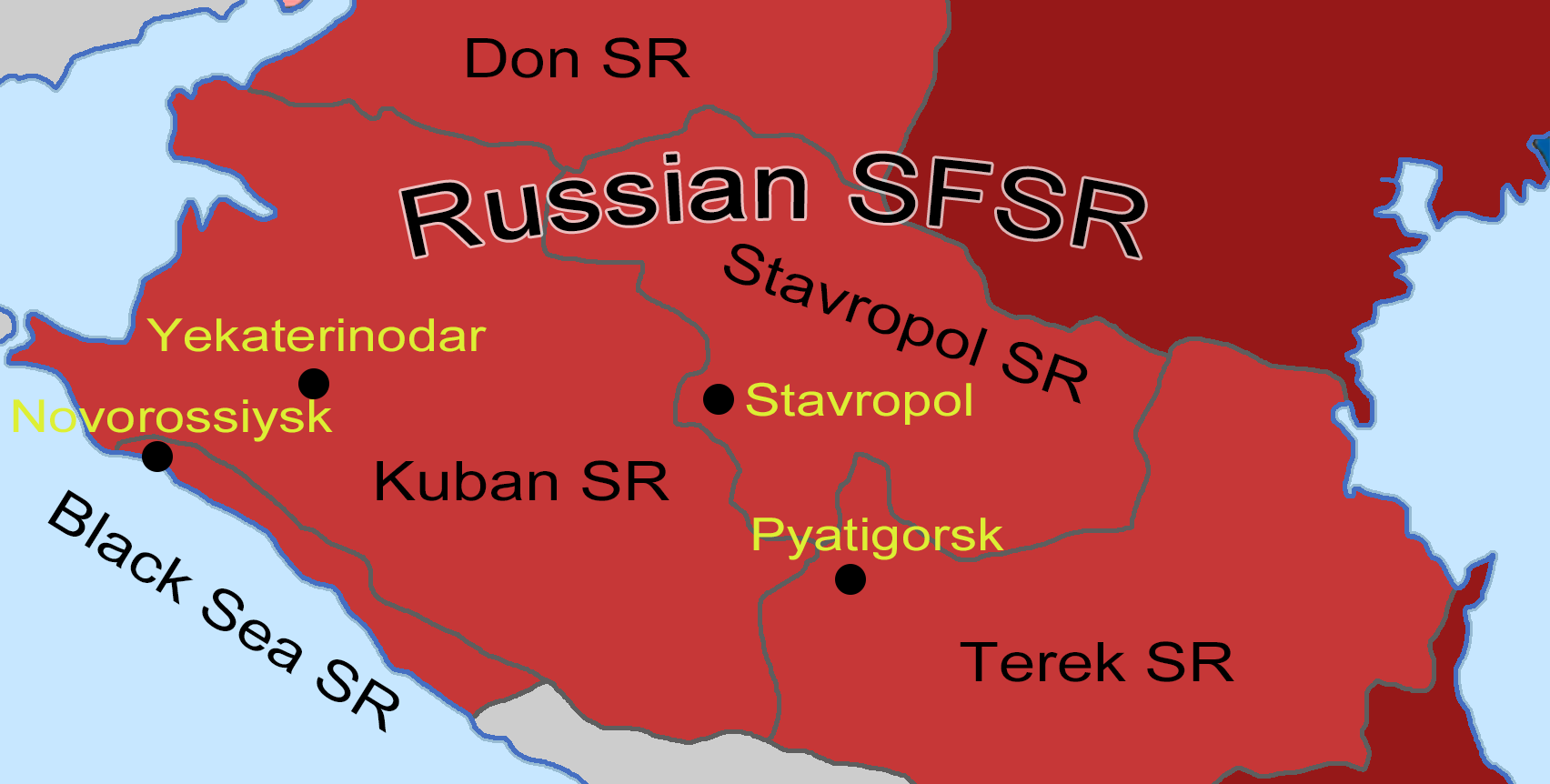
- Terek SR and other early republics of the RSFSR in the caucasus.
- Capital: first Pyatigorsk, and later Vladikavkaz
- History
  - Established: 1918
  - Disestablished: 1919
Preceded by	Succeeded by
Terek Oblast	North Caucasian Soviet Republic
- Today part of: Russia; Terek Oblast

The Terek Soviet Republic (Russian: Терская Советская Республика), or Terek People's Republic (Russian: Терская Народная Республика) (March 1918 – February 1919), was a short-lived republic on the territory of the former Terek Oblast. Its capital was first Pyatigorsk, and later Vladikavkaz. After July 1918, it was part of the North Caucasian Soviet Republic.

In contrast to other Soviet republics, the Republic was a coalition government.

The economist Jacob Marschak served as Secretary of Labour, despite being only a 19-year-old student.

After internal struggles, it was conquered by the Volunteer Army led by Anton Denikin in early 1919.
