= Anton Waibel =

German communist activist (1889–1969)

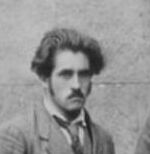

Leader of the Würzburg Soviet Republic
- In office April 7, 1919 – April 9, 1919
- Preceded by: Position established
- Succeeded by: Position abolished

Personal details
- Born: March 11, 1889
- Died: February 12, 1969 (aged 79) West Berlin
- Party: Communist Party of Germany (1919-1946)
- Other political affiliations: Social Democratic Party of Germany (1907-?); Socialist Unity Party of Germany (1946-1952)

Anton "Toni" Waibel (11 March 1889 – 12 February 1969) was a German communist revolutionary and activist.

== Biography ==
Waibel was born in to a Catholic Swabian family. He did an apprenticeship as a cabinet maker and later worked as a commercial clerk.

From 1906 he was a member of trade unions and active in the youth worker group. From 1907 he was a member of the SPD. Waibel took part in the International Socialist Congresses in 1907 and 1912. During the First World War he stayed partly in Switzerland. There he took part in the Zimmerwald conference of anti-war socialists in September 1915, and after meeting Lenin he joined his "Zimmerwald Left". He was imprisoned for a short time on the grounds of "mutiny" and then expelled to Germany in February 1919.

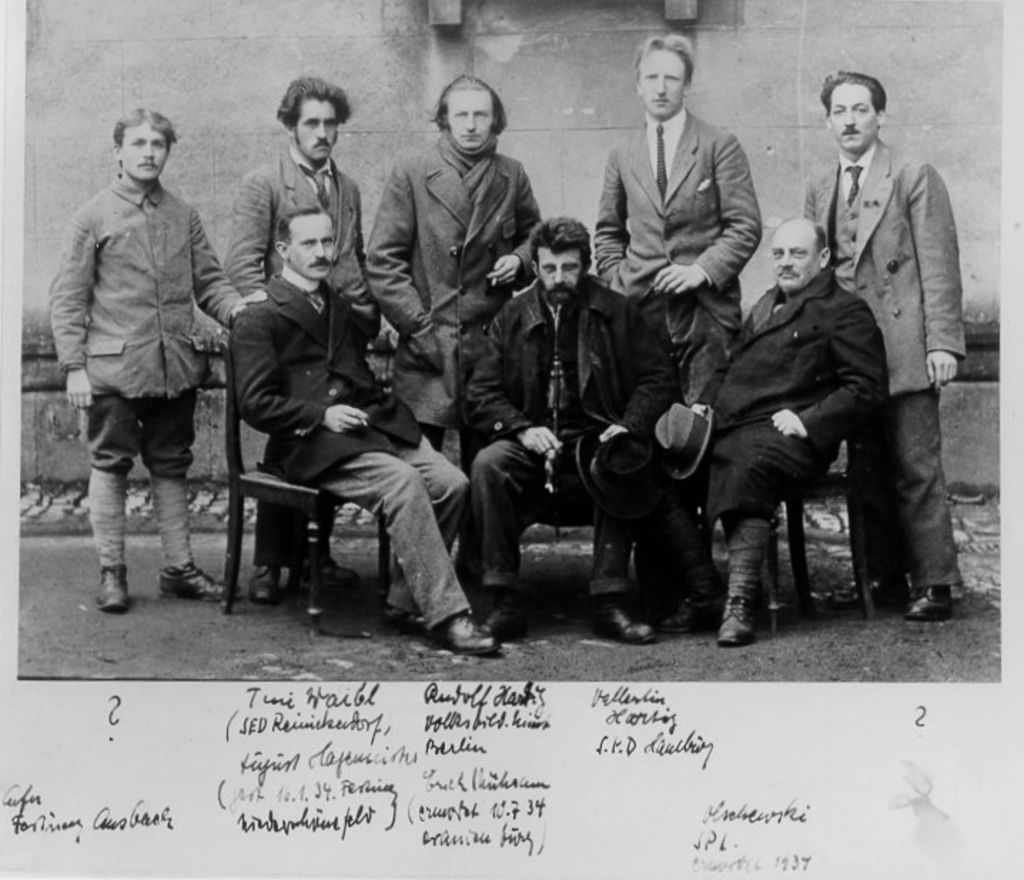
Anton Waibel (standing second from the left) with other leaders of the Bavarian Soviet Republic in prison

In 1919 he became a member and propaganda officer of the Communist Party of Germany (KPD) in Munich. In mid-March 1919 he was sent to Würzburg by the Munich Central Council of Bavarian Councils. After Erich Mühsam had telegraphed the Soviet Republic in Munich, Waibel proclaimed the Würzburg Soviet Republic, which only lasted until April 9. Because of his participation in the struggles of the Bavarian Soviet Republic in the action committee and in the leadership of the Red Army, he was sentenced to 15 years in prison.

He escaped from Niederschönenfeld prison in 1921 and stayed abroad until 1928. First in Moscow at the KUNMZ, later as a member of the Soviet Communist Party for the Comintern in the Balkans, among other places. He took part in the Third to Sixth World Congresses of the Comintern. After the Hindenburg amnesty in 1928, after the rest of his sentence had been waived in the course of amnesty measures, he returned to Germany and became secretary of the Red Aid of Germany, which was close to the KPD, as well as jointly responsible for the magazine Tribunal and speaker at party schools.

Waibel was arrested in Stuttgart on January 30, 1933, and sentenced to two years in prison on June 16, 1933, by the 5th Criminal Division of the Reich Court. In addition, in July 1933 he received a one-year prison sentence from the district court in Stuttgart for "mutiny". He was imprisoned continuously until 1945, most recently in the Buchenwald concentration camp. After his liberation, he was treated in the hospital until July 1945. In Berlin he headed the KPD and then SED local group in Berlin-Hermsdorf until 1947. He criticised the SED and was accused of Trotskyism in party proceedings in 1951/52 was charged and expelled from the party.

In 1969 he died in West Berlin.
