= Masha Sviatahor =

Belarusian visual artist

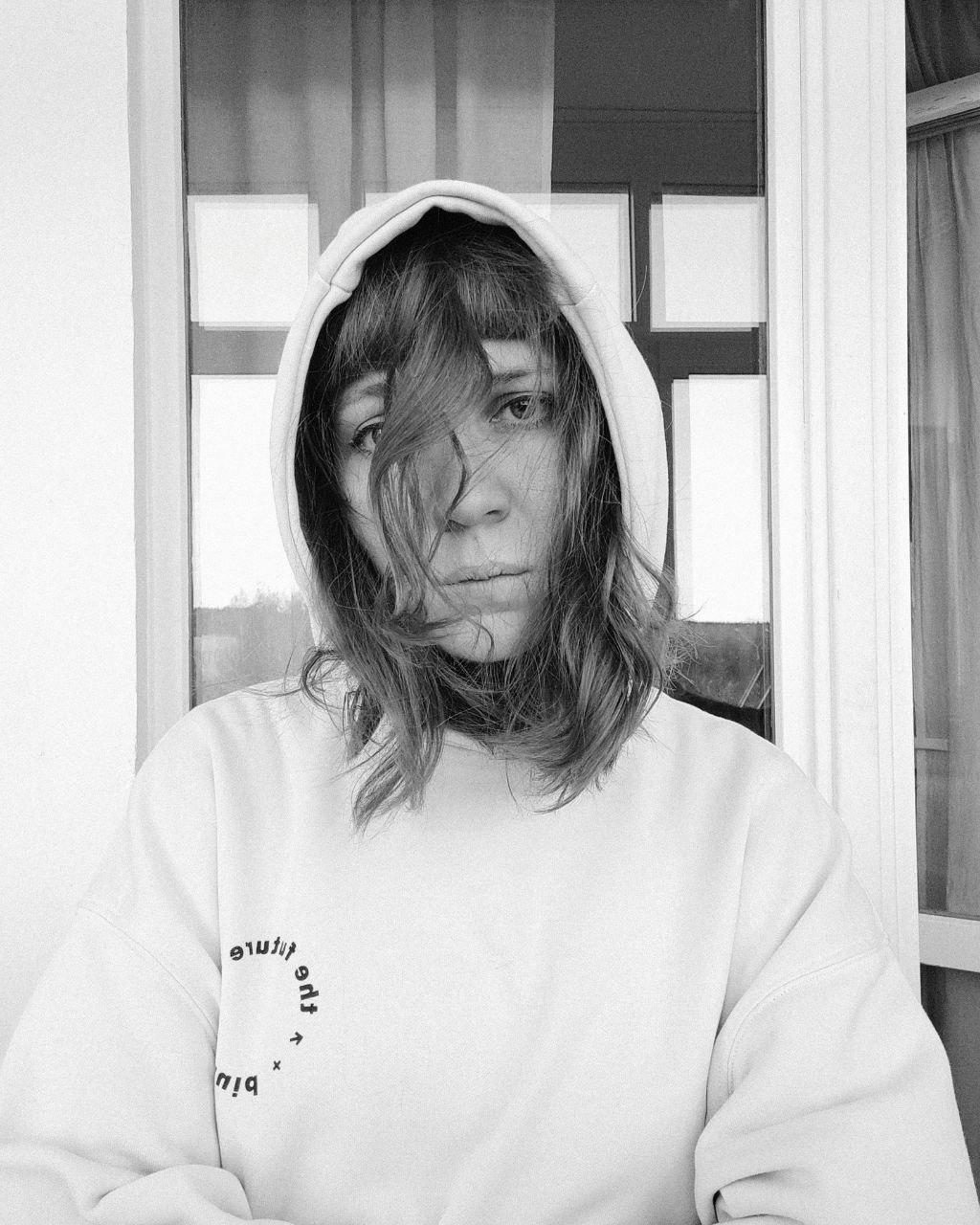
- Born: 12 May 1989 (age 37); Minsk, Belarus
- Education: Belarusian State University
- Known for: visual arts
- Movement: contemporary art
- Website: mashasviatahor.com

Masha Sviatahor (Belarusian: Маша Святагор; formerly transliterated as Masha Svyatogor) is a Belarusian visual artist known for her work with photography, collage, and mixed media. Her practice engages with history, collective memory, visual propaganda, and questions of power and ideology, employing photography, archival images, and Soviet propaganda materials.

== Early life and education ==
Sviatahor was born in 1989 in Minsk, then part of the Soviet Socialist Republic of Belarus. She has said that growing up in one of Minsk's dormitory districts "has had a considerable impact on my artistic practice ... both inspires and causes frustration and discomfort". She studied philology at Belarusian State University, graduating in 2013.

== Artistic Practice ==
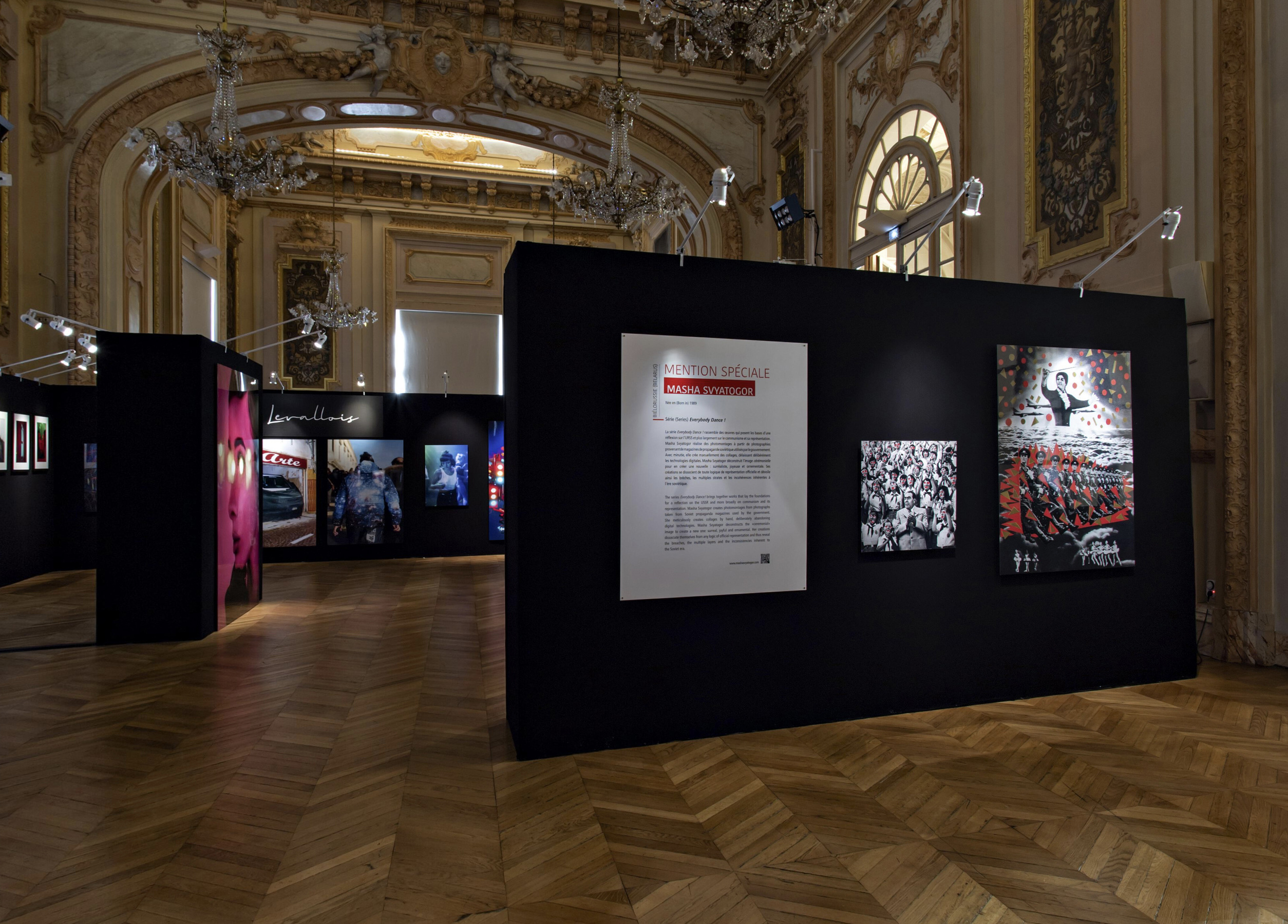
"Everybody Dance!". Exhibition view, Levallois, France in 2021.

Sviatahor debuted as an artist in 2017 with a solo exhibition at CECH Art Space in Minsk. She was an artist-in-residence at the Cité Internationale des Arts in Paris from 2023 to 2025.

Sviatahor's practice reflects critically on her environment, exploring the contradictions of life in Belarus. She deconstructs and reassembles Soviet-era archival images, exposing gaps and inconsistencies within their ideological framework.

A central feature of her work is the juxtaposition of historical imagery with contemporary events. She combines personal photographs with found material into layered compositions that blur the line between documentary and fiction, describing her interest as lying "between logic and absurdity, the order and the chaos, rational and irrational, resisting univocal interpretation or any definitive assessment". She has said her art practice grew out of an attempt to "transform my confusion and the feeling of loss, my inability to understand unfolding events and phenomena into a public statement and make my mental images visible".

In the series Kurasoushchyna, My Love (2015–2017), she combines documentary and phantasmagoric imagery to explore contradictions and inconsistencies in life in Belarus. The project Everybody Dance! (2018–2025) brings together artifacts and images that hold a significant place in collective memory and history. Her recent work draws on official photographs from magazines published in the Soviet Union to construct surreal depictions of Soviet-era culture, juxtaposing material from different historical and aesthetic contexts to prompt viewers to reconsider their assumptions.

== Selected Exhibitions ==
- 2025: Lost Territories: Tracing Imperial Violence, FOTODOK x Sputnik Photos, Utrecht, Netherland.
- 2024-2025: Displacements and Torrents, Cité Internationale des Arts, Paris, France.
- 2023: Fotofestiwal Łódź, Poland.
- 2022: When The Sun Is Low - The Shadows Are Long, GfZK, Leipzig, Germany.
- 2022: When The Sun Is Low - The Shadows Are Long, Arsenał Gallery, Białystok, Poland.
- 2022: UNFAIR, Amsterdam, Netherland.
- 2022: Secondary Archive, Manifesta 14, Pristina, Kosovo.
- 2021: Prix Levallois, France.
- 2021: KVOST, Berlin, Germany.
- 2020: Circulation(s) Festival, Paris, France.
- 2020: Vintage Photo Festival, Bydgoszcz, Poland.
- 2019: Konstepidemin Art Center, Göteborg, Sweden.
- 2018: Obscura Festival of Photography, Penang, Malaysia.
- 2017: Fotopub Festival, Novo Mesto, Slovenia.
- 2017: Queering Yerevan Festival, Armenia.

== Awards and Recognitions ==
- 2021: Prince Claus Seed Award. The Prince Claus Fund recognized Sviatahor.
- 2021: "Ones to Watch," British Journal of Photography. Selected as "Ones to Watch" for her approach to archival imagery in politically engaged art.
- 2021: Special Mention Prize, Prix Levallois.
- 2020: FUTURES Talent.

== Publications ==
=== Books ===
Sviatahor's first book, Everybody Dance!, was published by TAMAKA in 2025. It draws on six and a half years of work to develop a visual language combining political critique with commentary on the historical method of photomontage. The book collects her "Collage Period" work and has been described as a reflection on the human experience of historical upheaval.

Everybody Dance! won two D&AD Awards, for Book Design and Book Cover Design, in 2026, and was longlisted for Die Schönsten Deutschen Bücher 2026 (Germany's national book design competition). It was also featured in the "Bookshelf" section of the British Journal of Photography (issue 7924, October–December 2025, "Body Talk").

== Gallery ==
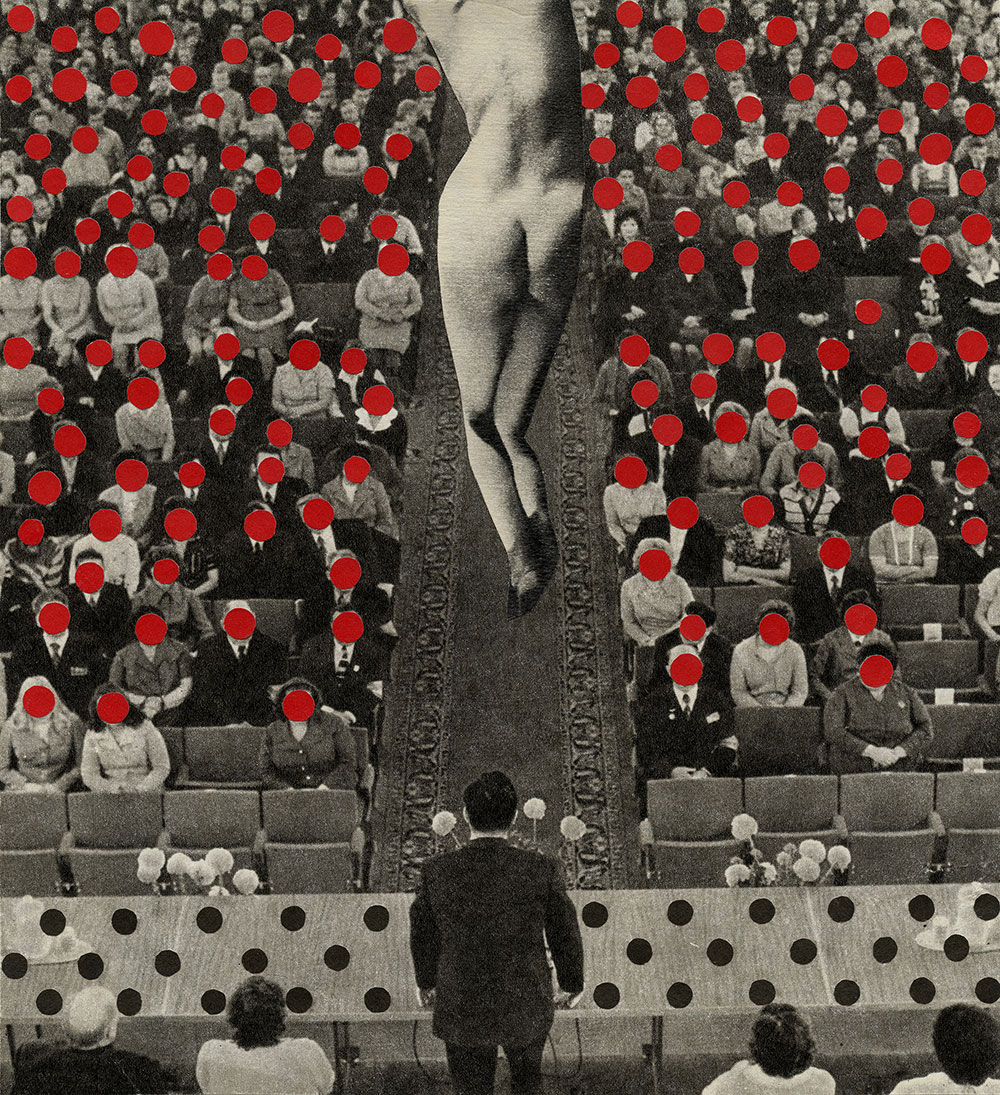
Masha Sviatahor, Meeting, from the series Everybody Dance!, 2019

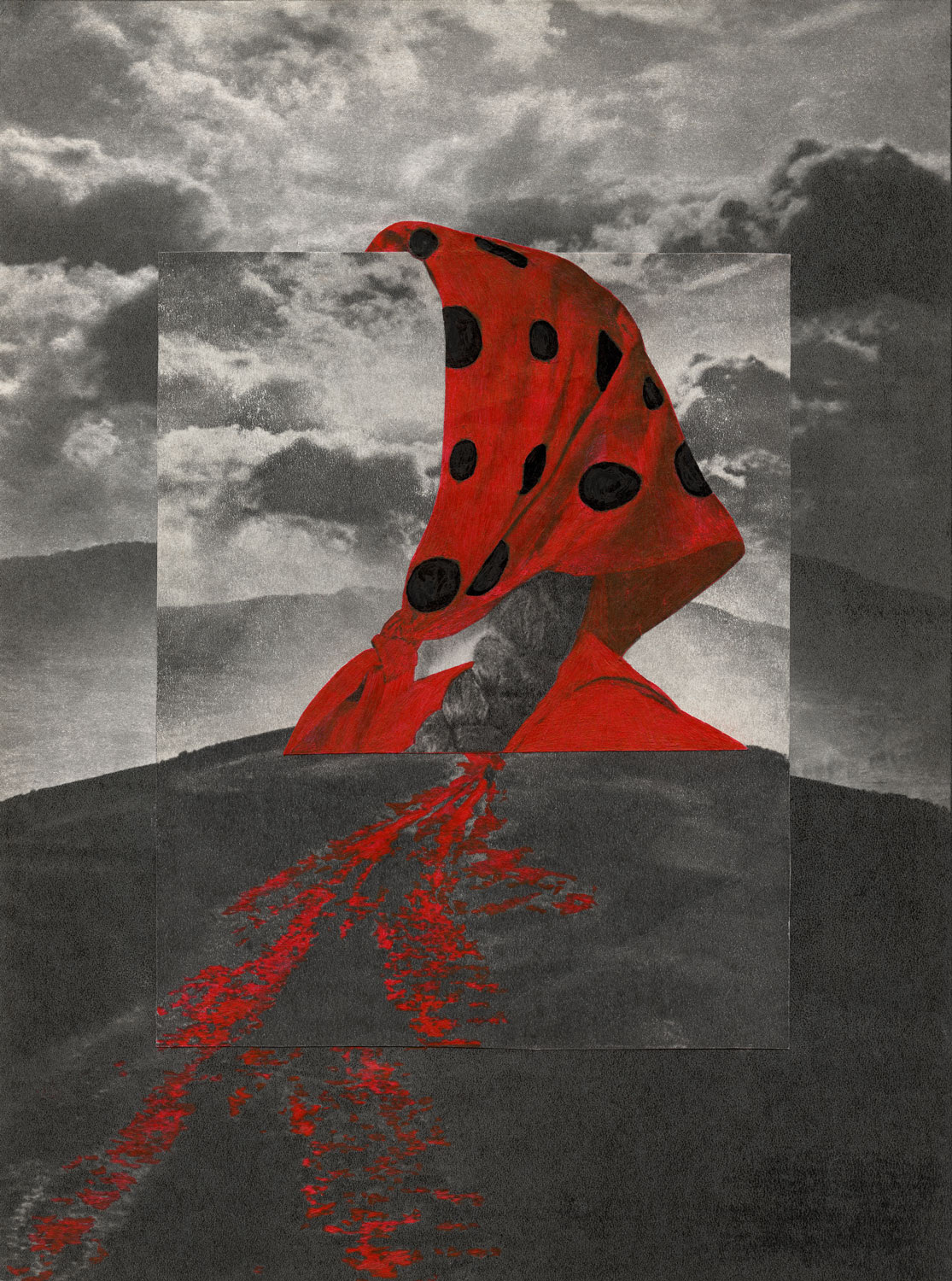
Masha Sviatahor, Braid, from the series Čyrvony Les, 2023

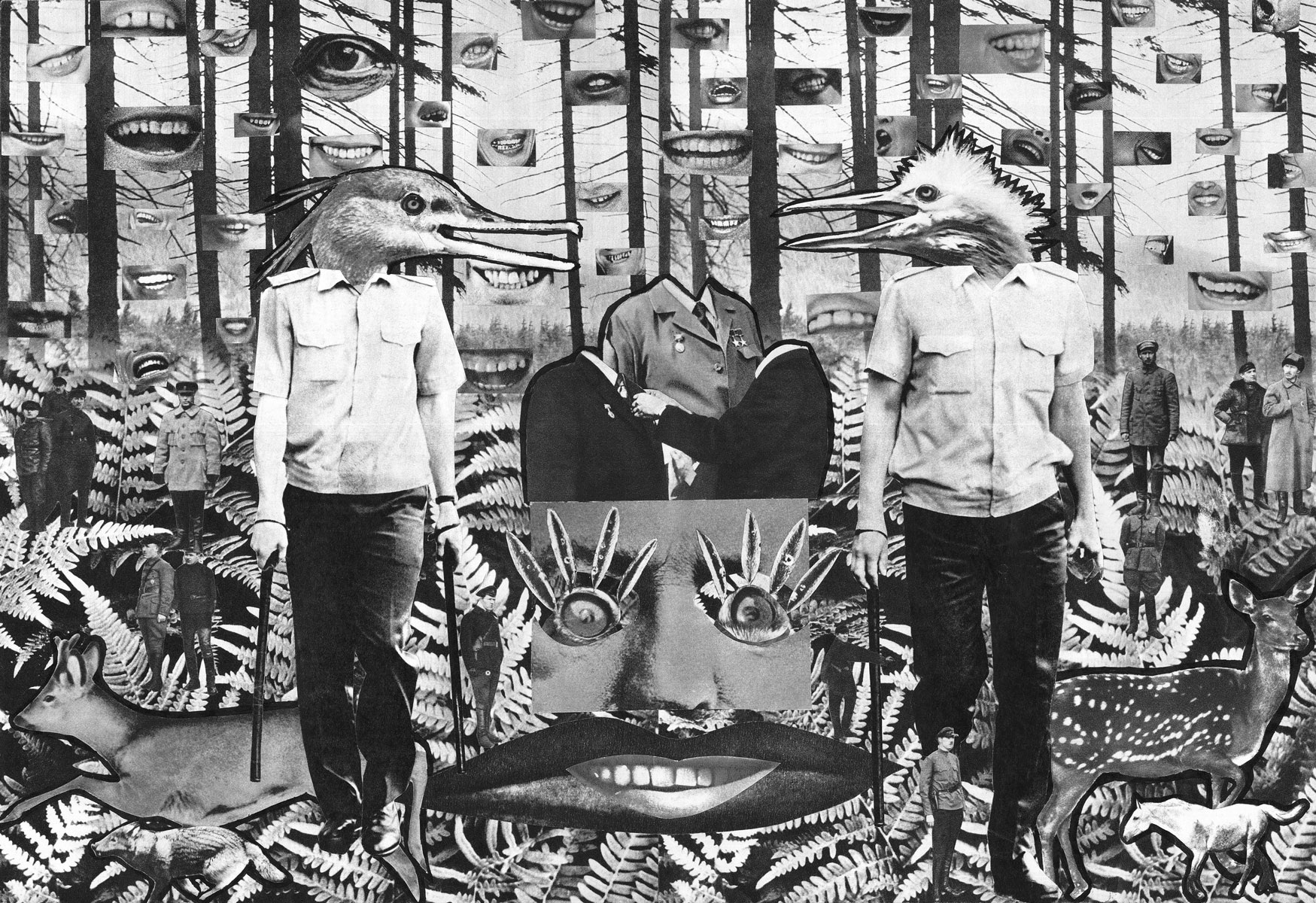
Masha Sviatahor, In the Woods, from the series Čyrvony Les, 2021
