= Dmitry Putyata =

Russian explorer (1855–1915)

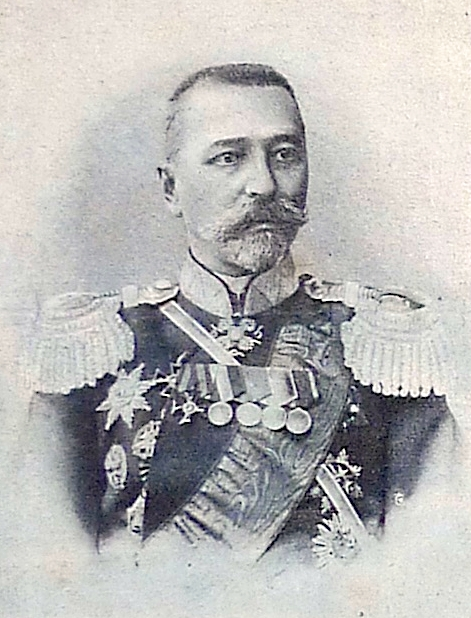
Dmitry Putyata 1904

Dmitry Vasilyevich Putyata (Russian: Дмитрий Васильевич Путята) (Smolensk province, 24 February 1855 - Odessa, 3 February 1915) was a General of the Imperial Russian Army and a Russian explorer of the Pamir Mountains.

In 1883 he explored Karakul Lake, Tashkurgan Town, the Bendersky Pass to the Wakhan Valley and westward along the Ghunt River. He covered more territory than any previous or subsequent expedition. In the 1890s Putyata served on Russian General Staff as a specialist on China.
In the late 1890s, Putyata as a military Attaché to Korea was sent to Korean Empire to modernize the Imperial Korean Army with some other officers as a request of Min Young-hwan, the Minister of War of Korean Empire who visited Russia before. However, he had conflicts with Min and tried to go back to Russia. According to the report of French Embassy in Korea, Putyata was unhappy about his payment in Korea and wanted to go back to Russia. Finally on 12 June 1897, Putyata was permitted to go back to Russia. But because he had to write reports, Putyata stayed in Korea. Finally on 24 August 1897, Putyata was permitted to go back to Russia before the successor's arrival.

Between 1902 and 1906, he was Military governor of the Amur Region. He was accused of liberalism and connivance with the revolutionaries and strikers during the Russian Revolution of 1905. He was relieved of his duties and recalled to the General Staff in August 1906. In March 1907, he was appointed as head of the Odessa brigade, and died there on 3 February 1915.
