= Amur Oblast (Russian Empire) =

Subdivision of the Russian Empire

Amur Oblast Амурская область
- Oblast of the Russian Empire
- 1858–1922
- Coat of arms

- Amur Oblast within the Russian Empire
- Capital: Blagoveshchensk
- Area
- 449,500 km^{2} (173,600 sq mi)
- Population
  - 1897: 120 306
  - Type: Oblast
- Historical era: 19th century
  - Established: 1858
  - Disestablished: 1922
Preceded by	Succeeded by
Qing dynasty	Amur Socialist Soviet Republic
- Today part of: Russia

The Amur Oblast was formed on December 20, 1858 by the Personal Decree No. 33862. By this Decree, on the proposal of the Governor–General of Eastern Siberia and the Siberian Committee, the Amur Region was made up of lands "located on the left bank of the Amur River, starting from the junction of the Shilka and Argun Rivers or the borders of the Trans–Baikal and Yakutsk Oblasts, along the entire course of the Amur, to the mouth of the river Ussuri and to the new border of the Primorsky Oblast".

== General characteristics ==
The vast, little–explored area of Eastern Siberia along the left bank of the middle reaches of the Amur, mainly included the river areas of 2 large tributaries of the Amur – Zeya and Bureya. Formerly it belonged to China and was ceded to Russia in 1858 under the Aigun Treaty.

- Area – 449,500 square kilometers;
- Population – 62,640 people;
- Main City – Blagoveshchensk (at the mouth of the Zeya).

The Amur Oblast was extremely sparsely populated. Before the conquest of the region by Russia in the 1850s, the area was inhabited only by wandering foreigners, and the far distance from the populated areas of Russia and the lack of any convenient means of communication made resettlement very difficult. Much closer to native Russia, for example, in Altai, settlers found many convenient lands; it was much more convenient even to get to the Primorskaya Oblast by sea, and the settlers there also had the advantage of convenient marketing of products to Vladivostok. There was no road along the Amur, there was a traffic in the summer on ships, and in the winter on the ice of the river. In spring and autumn, when the ice is falling, it was completely interrupted.

== Administrative divisions ==
During the period of the Russian Empire, the Amur Oblast was made into special territories:

- District of the Amur Cossack Army with special paramilitary administration, which consisted of 11 stanitsa districts;
- Amur District, which united 26 peasant volosts;
- The railway settlements were subordinate to the gendarme–police departments;
- Mountain Police Districts: Amursky, Bureinsky and Zeisky.

On July 17, 1858, the first city was formed in the oblast – Blagoveshchensk. On May 12, 1906, the village of the Verkhneamurskaya Gold Mining Company Zeysky Warehouse was given the status of a city and the name Zeya–Pier, which in 1913 was changed to Zeya. Simultaneously with the assignment of the status of a city to the Zeya Warehouse, a new city was founded on the banks of the Zeya River near the village of Surazhevka – Alekseevsk, which in 1917 was renamed Svobodny.

According to the 1917 census, the Amur District included the following volosts: Amuro–Zeiskaya, Bolshe–Sazanskaya, Borisoglebovskaya, Belskaya, Valuevskaya, Voznesenovskaya, Verninskaya, Gilchinskaya, Gondattievskaya, Erkovetskaya, Zavitinskaya, Ivanovskaya, Kozmo–Demyanovskaya, Krasnoyarovskaya, Kuzmichevskaya, Mazanovskaya, Ovsyankovskaya, Pesyankovskaya, Serebryanskaya, Tambovskaya, Tarbogataiskaya, Tomskaya, Uldurinskaya.

And the Amur Cossack Army District included the following stanitsky districts: Albazinsky, Ekaterininsky, Ekaterino–Nikolsky, Ignashinsky, Innokentievsky, Kumarsky, Mikhailo–Semenovsky, Nikolaevsky, Poyarkovsky, Raddevsky, Chernyaevsky.

In 1917–1920, temporary state formations were established on the territory of the oblast: the Amur Socialist Soviet Republic and the Provisional Government of the Amur Oblast, whose leadership did not have the ability to change the administrative–territorial division. Therefore, during this period, the volosts were divided and renamed by the forces of the communities of the inhabitants. By 1920, Sergeevskaya and Chernigovskaya Volosts were formed on the territory of the oblast, Troitskaya Volost was renamed into Olginskaya.

On April 6, 1920, the Amur Oblast became part of the Far Eastern Republic, and its administrative–territorial division changed only on June 15, 1922 after the adoption of the law of the Far Eastern Republic "On the Division of the Amur Oblast into Counties", which entered into force on July 18, 1922. 4 districts were formed on the territory: Zeisky, Svobodnensky, Blagoveshchensky and Zavitinsky. On November 6, 1922, by the law of the Far Eastern Republic, the oblast was transformed into the Amur Province.

== Population ==
During the conquest of the oblast, there were very few wandering aliens here: the Orochons west of the Never River, hunters, and Manegrs to the east of it, who were partly engaged in cattle breeding. In addition, there were few Chinese and Manchus near the Zeya River, some of whom remained in the region. Below the mouth of the Bureya, Tunguses and Golds were occasionally encountered. The Russian population, which lived here for no more than 35 years, consisted mainly of Cossacks living in the villages at a distance of 20 versts from one another. Only near Blagoveshchensk was the population a little denser. In the first years, from 1862, there was almost exclusively mandatory resettlement of the Cossacks, in the next 17 years the population doubled. According to the average conclusion for 15 years, there were 4.7 births and 2.9 deaths per 100 inhabitants.

National composition in 1897:

County	Great Russians	Little Russians	Chinese	Manchus	Koreans	Evenki
Oblast as a Whole	68.5%	17.5%	6.5%	2.8%	1.3%	1.1%

== Oblast administration ==
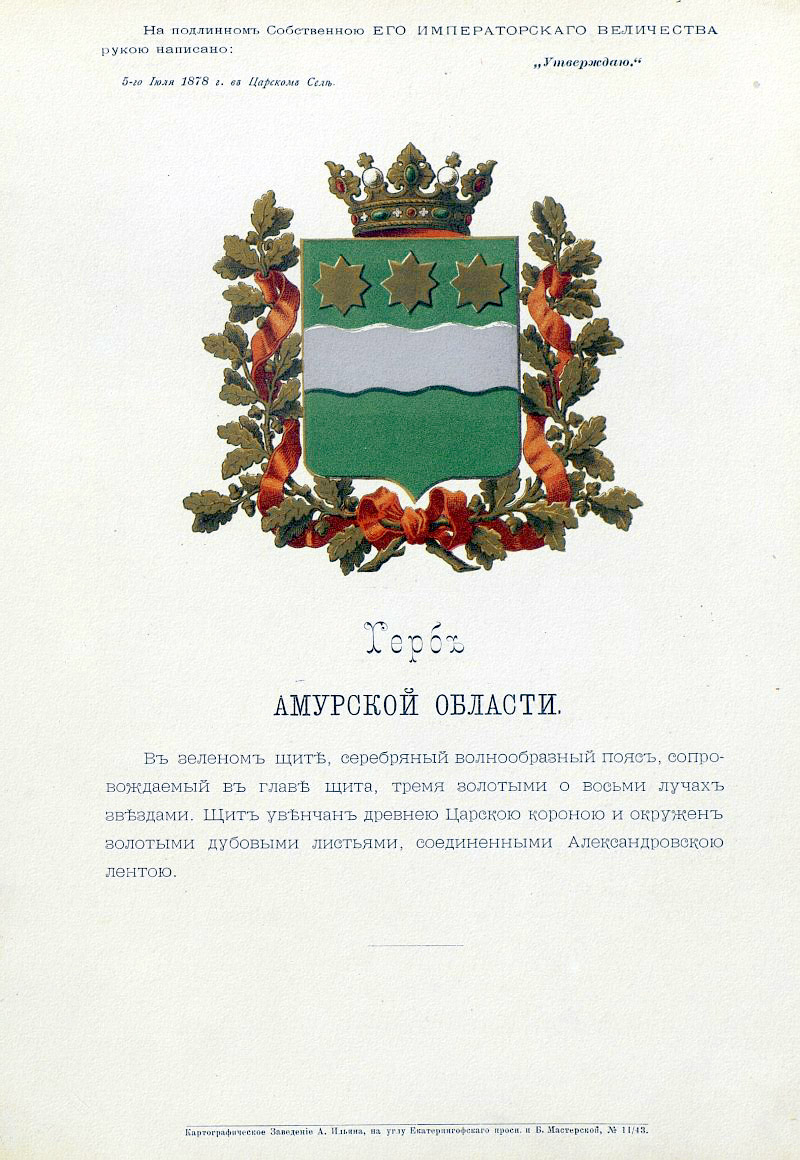
The coat of arms of the oblast with an official description, approved by Alexander II (1878)

=== Military governors ===
Name	Title, rank	Time of filling the position
Nikolay Busse	Major General	November 18, 1858 – August 1, 1866
Ivan Pedashenko	Major General, Acting (approved June 2, 1868)	December 25, 1866 – May 29, 1874
Albert Offenberg	Baron, Adjutant Wing, Colonel, Acting	May 29, 1874 – March 7, 1880
Joseph Baranov	Major General	April 5, 1880 – June 27, 1881
Peter Lazarev	Major General	June 27, 1881 – February 27, 1886
Arkady Benevsky	Major General	February 27, 1886 – March 14, 1892
Dmitry Arseniev	Lieutenant General	June 11, 1892 – June 11, 1897
Konstantin Gribsky	Lieutenant General	July 2, 1897 – February 28, 1902
Dmitry Putyata	Lieutenant General	March 30, 1902 – August 22, 1906
Arkady Sychevsky	Major General	August 22, 1906 – October 30, 1910
Arkady Valuev	Major General	October 30, 1910 – August 9, 1913
Vladimir Tolmachev	Lieutenant General	August 20, 1913 – January 20, 1916
Konstantin Khagondokov	Major General	1916–1917

=== Vice Governors ===
Name	Title, rank	Time of filling the position
Sergey Taskin	Actual State Councillor	January 1, 1898 – January 26, 1909
Alexander Chaplinsky	State Councillor (Actual State Councillor)	January 26, 1909 – 1914
Evgeny Bodungen	Court Councillor (Collegiate Councillor)	1914–1915
Evgeny Alekseevsky	Collegiate Councillor (State Councillor)	1915–1917

== Economy ==
Along the lower reaches of the Zeya and the middle reaches of the Amur, the soil was fertile, and the Russians, Chinese and Manchus who lived here were engaged in agriculture. At first, however, due to ignorance of the conditions of the region, floods were very harmful, spoiling the bread, carrying away the mown hay, and so on. The Russians sowed especially spring rye, buckwheat and oats, Manchu sowed millet (Setaria Italica), then wheat, barley and peas. Cattle breeding and gardening did not constitute a separate trade, all the Cossacks and peasants were engaged in the first. Hunting for fur–bearing animals was quite widespread, especially for squirrels and sables, but the animals were exterminated so mercilessly that the craft decreased. The Amur and its tributaries were very rich in fish, among other things, in valuable salmon and whitefishes. But there was no large–scale fishing, the methods of salting and other methods of preservation were very insufficient, and therefore the fish soon deteriorated and could not be taken far away, except in winter.

In the Amur Oblast, there was only one mining industry, the extraction of gold from placers. Gold mines are usually divided into the following groups:

1. Verkhne–Amurskaya – before the confluence of the Zeya. Most of all along the Yankanu River. Near the Amur, on the Chinese territory, there were fabulously rich placers on the Zheltuga River, which were arbitrarily mined in the early 1880s by gold miners of different nationalities;
2. Zeiskaya – the closer to Stanovoy, the richer the placer;
3. Selimdzhinskaya;
4. Bureinskaya;
5. Ozernaya, along the banks of the Amur below the Small Khingan.

A total of about 200 poods of pure gold is mined a year for 2,600,000 rubles. In the Amur Oblast, it was possible to develop only mines, much richer than in the Yenisei, and even more so in the Tomsk Province, since the workers, the delivery of food, cars, and so on were very expensive. There were 2,350 rubles per worker here, and only 586 rubles in the Altai Mines. Coal was found near Oldoy, then along the middle course of the Zeya and along the Bureya, but was not mined.

== Symbolics ==
The coat of arms of the oblast was approved on July 5, 1878 by Emperor Alexander II.

Description of the coat of arms: "In the green shield there is a silver undulating belt, accompanied at the head of the shield by three golden stars with eight rays. The shield is crowned with the ancient Tsar's crown and surrounded by golden oak leaves connected by the Alexander Ribbon".

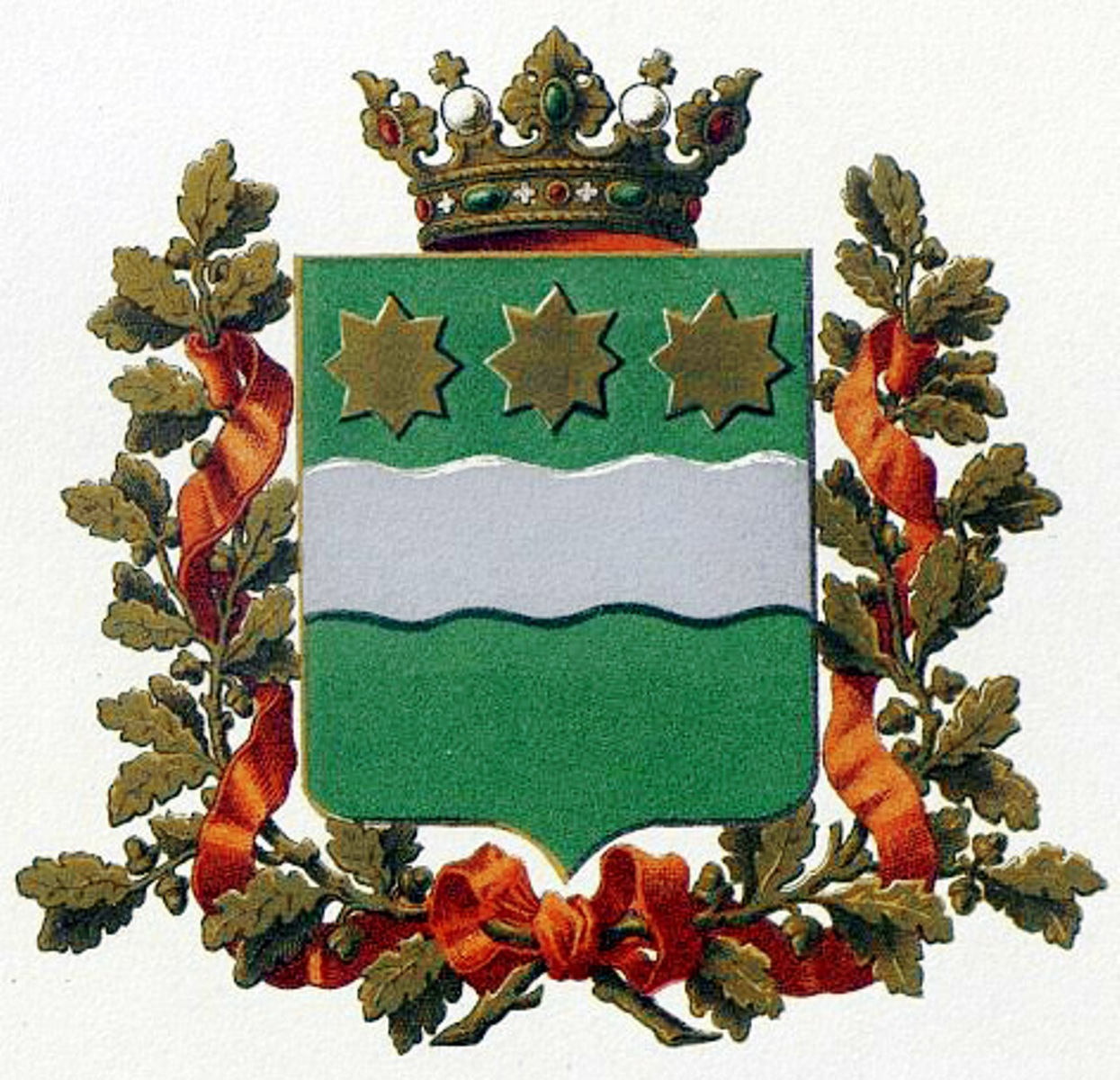
Coat of Arms of the Oblast (Publishing House of the Ministry of Internal Affairs, 1880)

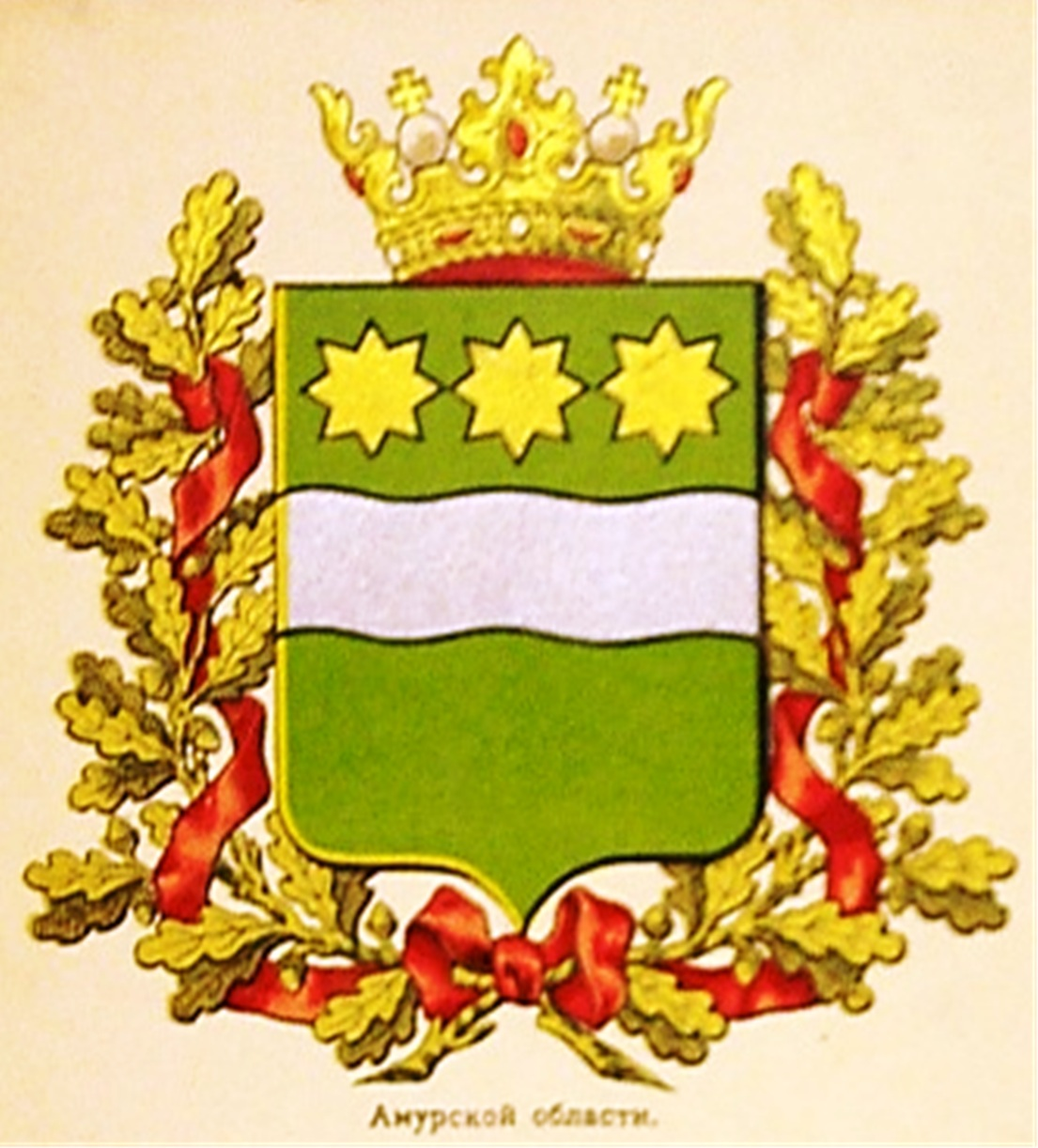
Coat of Arms of the Oblast (Sukachov Publishing House, 1878)

Restored Version of the Coat of Arms

== Sources ==
- Amur Oblast // Brockhaus and Efron Encyclopedic Dictionary: In 86 Volumes (82 Volumes and 4 Additional) – Saint Petersburg, 1890–1907
- Military Governors of the Amur Oblast (1858–1917) // Based on the Book by Vladimir Abelentsev (Compiler). Military Governors of the Amur Oblast. To the 150th Anniversary of the Founding of the Ust–Zeya Post. 1856–1917. Collection of Documents and Materials. Blagoveshchensk: Amur Oblast Museum of Local Lore Named After Grigory Daursky, 2006
