= Stavropol Soviet Republic =

Coordinates: 45°03′00″N 41°59′00″E

Stavropol Soviet Republic Russian: Ставропольская Советская Республика
- Soviet Republic of the Russian SFSR
- January 1–July 7, 1918
- Flag

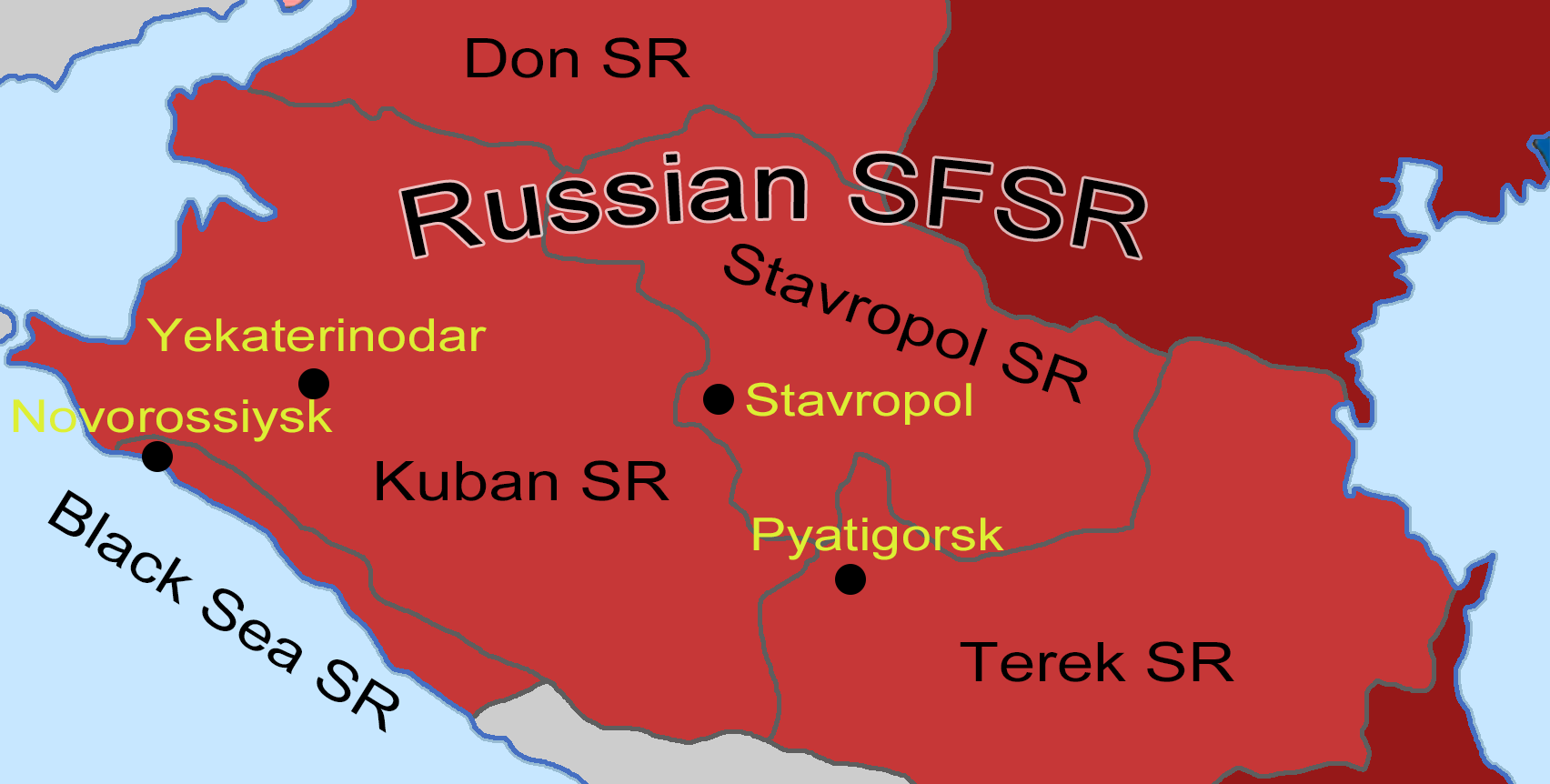
- Soviet Caucasus in May 1918, with the Stavropol SR in the middle.
- History
  - Established: 1 January
  - Disestablished: 7 July 1918
Preceded by	Succeeded by
Stavropol Governorate	North Caucasian Soviet Republic

The Stavropol Soviet Republic (Russian: Ставропольская Советская Республика, romanized: Stavropol’skaya Sovetskaya Respublika; 1 January 1918 –7 July 1918) was a short-lived republic on the territory of the former Stavropol Governorate of the Russian Empire. Its capital was Stavropol. It was merged into the North Caucasian Soviet Republic.
