= Kuban Soviet Republic =

Soviet republic in existence April–May 1918

Kuban Soviet Republic Кубанская Советская Республика Кубанська Радянська Республіка
- Republic of the Russian SFSR
- 1918
- Capital: Yekaterinodar (now Krasnodar)
- Area
  - Coordinates: 45°02′N 38°58′E
- Government
- Chairman^{a}
  - 1918: Yan Poluyan
- History
  - Established: 13 April 1918
  - Merger: 30 May 1918
| Preceded by | Succeeded by |
| Kuban People's Republic | Kuban-Black Sea Soviet Republic |
- Full official title was "Chairman of the People's Revolutionary Committee of Kuban Oblast".

The Kuban Soviet Republic (April 13 – May 30, 1918) was part of Soviet Russia within the general territory of the Kuban. Its capital was Yekaterinodar.

It was merged into the Kuban-Black Sea Soviet Republic on May 30, 1918, less than 2 months after it was formed.

== Background ==
In February 1918, the First Congress of Soviets of the Kuban Region was held in Armavir. One of the first actions undertaken by the Congress was the election of a regional council, which designated the Soviets as the sole legitimate authority of the Kuban People's Republic and banned the Kuban Rada.

At the end of March, Bolshevik forces had managed to occupy the Kuban capital of Yekaterinodar, which led to the formation of the Yekaterinodar Committee of the Bolsheviks and subsequently the 1st and 2nd Yekaterinodar Communist Regiments.

== Creation ==
The Second Congress of Soviets of the Kuban Region was held in Yekaterinodar from April 1 to April 16, and was attended by 832 delegates.

| Affiliation | Number of Delegates |
|---|---|
| Bolsheviks | 639 |
| Left SRs | 130 |
| Right SRs | 5 |
| Mensheviks | 5 |
| Anarchists | 26 |

On April 13, the Congress proclaimed the Kuban Soviet Republic. That same day, many in attendance spoke in favor of uniting with the nearby Black Sea Soviet Republic.

Soon after the creation of the Kuban SR, the Council of People's Commissars was formed, which consisted of sixteen members. Yan Vasilyevich Poluyan was elected as Chairman and Vladimir Cherny was elected as Secretary.

The Kuban-Black Sea Military Revolutionary Committee, a joint command structure between the Kuban and Black Sea SRs, was formed soon after the creation of the Kuban SR.

== Formation of the Kuban-Black Sea Soviet Republic ==
The Third Extraordinary United Congress of Soviets of the Kuban and Black Sea Soviet Republics was held in Yekaterinodar from May 28 to May 30, and was attended by 882 delegates.

| Affiliation | Number of Delegates |
|---|---|
| Bolsheviks | 562 |
| Left SRs | 242 |
| "Non-Partisants" | 78 |

On May 30, a proposal for a Central Executive Committee of the Soviets of the Kuban and Black Sea Republics was approved (despite protests from the Left SRs), and the Kuban-Black Sea Soviet Republic was proclaimed shortly after.
