= North Caucasian Soviet Republic =

Territory in the North Caucasus

North Caucasian Soviet Republic Russian: Се́веро-Кавка́зская Сове́тская Респу́блика
- Soviet Republic of the Russian SFSR
- 7 July 1918–11 January 1919
- Flag

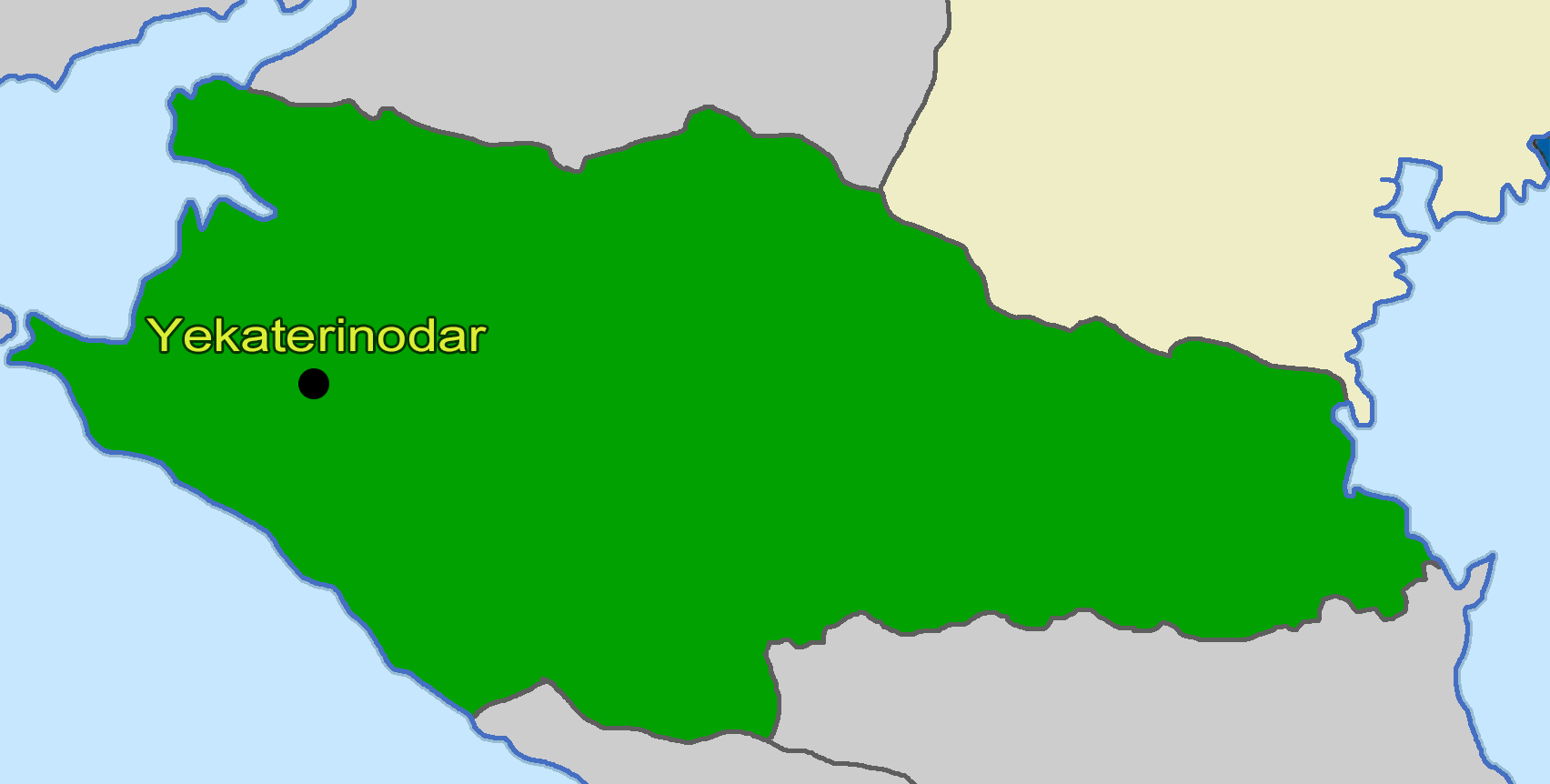
- Capital: Yekaterinodar until August 17, 1918; Pyatigorsk
- History
  - Established: 7 July 1918
  - Disestablished: 11 January 1919
Preceded by
Kuban-Black Sea Soviet Republic
Stavropol Soviet Republic
Terek Soviet Republic
Succeeded by
Russian SFSR

North Caucasian Soviet Republic (Russian: Се́веро-Кавка́зская Сове́тская Респу́блика, Severo-Kavkazskaya Sovetskaya Respublika; 7 July 1918 – 11 January 1919) was a territory in the North Caucasus established to consolidate Soviet power during the Russian Civil War. A republic of the Russian SFSR, it was created by merging the Kuban-Black Sea Soviet Republic, the Stavropol Soviet Republic, and the Terek Soviet Republic. Its capital was Yekaterinodar; however, on August 16, 1918 Yekaterinodar was taken by Denikin's Volunteer Army, and the capital was moved to Pyatigorsk.

By the end of 1918, the majority of the republic's territory was captured by the White Army. On January 11 1919, the All-Russian Central Executive Committee abolished the republic.

== See also ==
- Mountainous Republic of the Northern Caucasus
