= Black Sea Soviet Republic =

Republic in Soviet Russia (March-May 1918)

- Soviet Republic of the Russian SFSR
- March 1918–May 1918
- Flag

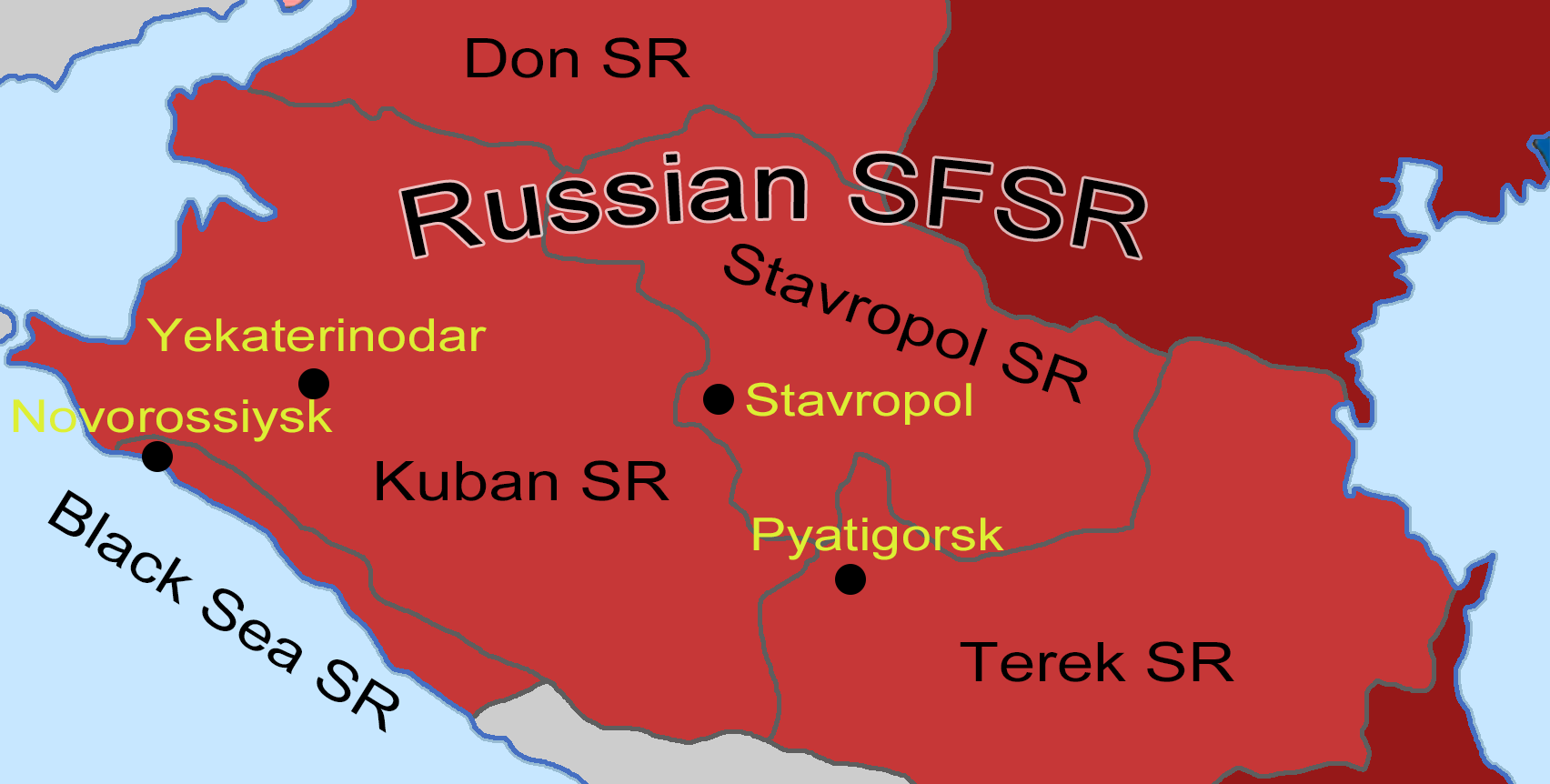
- Black Sea SR in the Soviet-controlled Caucasus, May 1918.
- Capital: Novorossiysk
- History
  - Established: March 1918
  - Disestablished: May 1918
Preceded by	Succeeded by
Black Sea Governorate	Kuban-Black Sea Soviet Republic

The Black Sea Soviet Republic (March – 30 May 1918) was a republic of the Russian SFSR within the territory that corresponded to Black Sea Governorate in the Russian Empire. Its seat was Novorossiysk.

In May 1918 it was merged with Kuban Soviet Republic into the Kuban-Black Sea Soviet Republic.
