= Kuban–Black Sea Soviet Republic =

Republic within the RSFSR (1918)

Kuban–Black Sea Soviet Republic Кубано-Черноморская Советская Республика
- Republic of the Russian SFSR
- 1918
- Flag

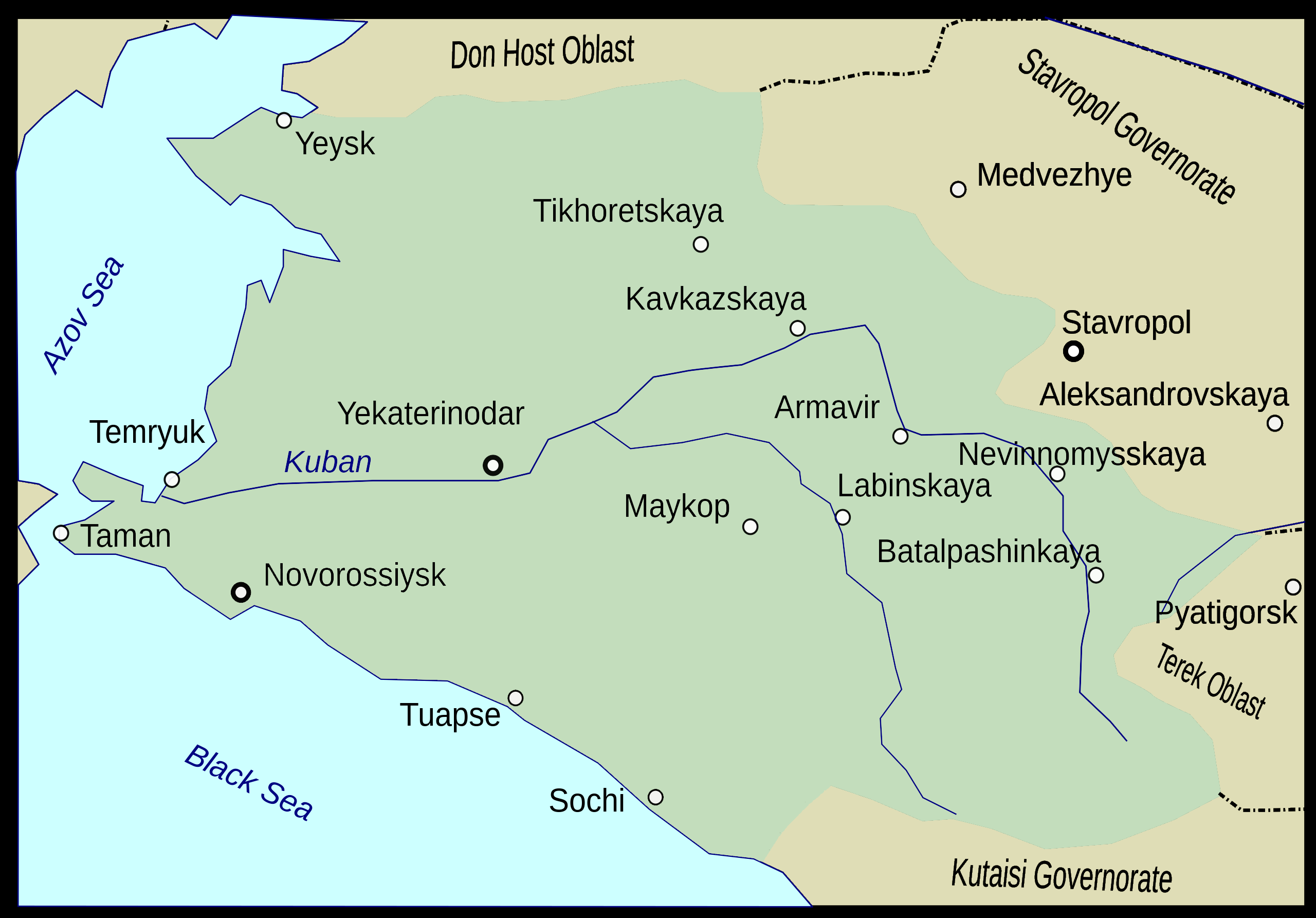
- Capital: Yekaterinodar (now Krasnodar)
- Area
  - Coordinates: 45°02′N 38°58′E
- Government
- Chairman of the Central Executive Committee
  - 1918: Avran Rubin
- Historical era: Russian Civil War
  - Established: 30 May 1918
  - Merged: 6 July 1918
Preceded by	Succeeded by
Kuban Soviet Republic; Black Sea Soviet Republic	North Caucasian Soviet Republic

The Kuban–Black Sea Soviet Republic (May 30 – July 6, 1918) was a short-lived republic of the Russian SFSR. Its capital was Yekaterinodar, now known as Krasnodar.

It was created by merging the Black Sea Soviet Republic and Kuban Soviet Republic. Later, it was itself merged into the North Caucasian Soviet Republic. The leader of the republic was Avran Rubin.
