= Alexander Filimonov (Cossack) =

First Ataman of the Kuban People's Republic from 1917 to 1919

Aleksandr Filimonov
- Александр Филимонов
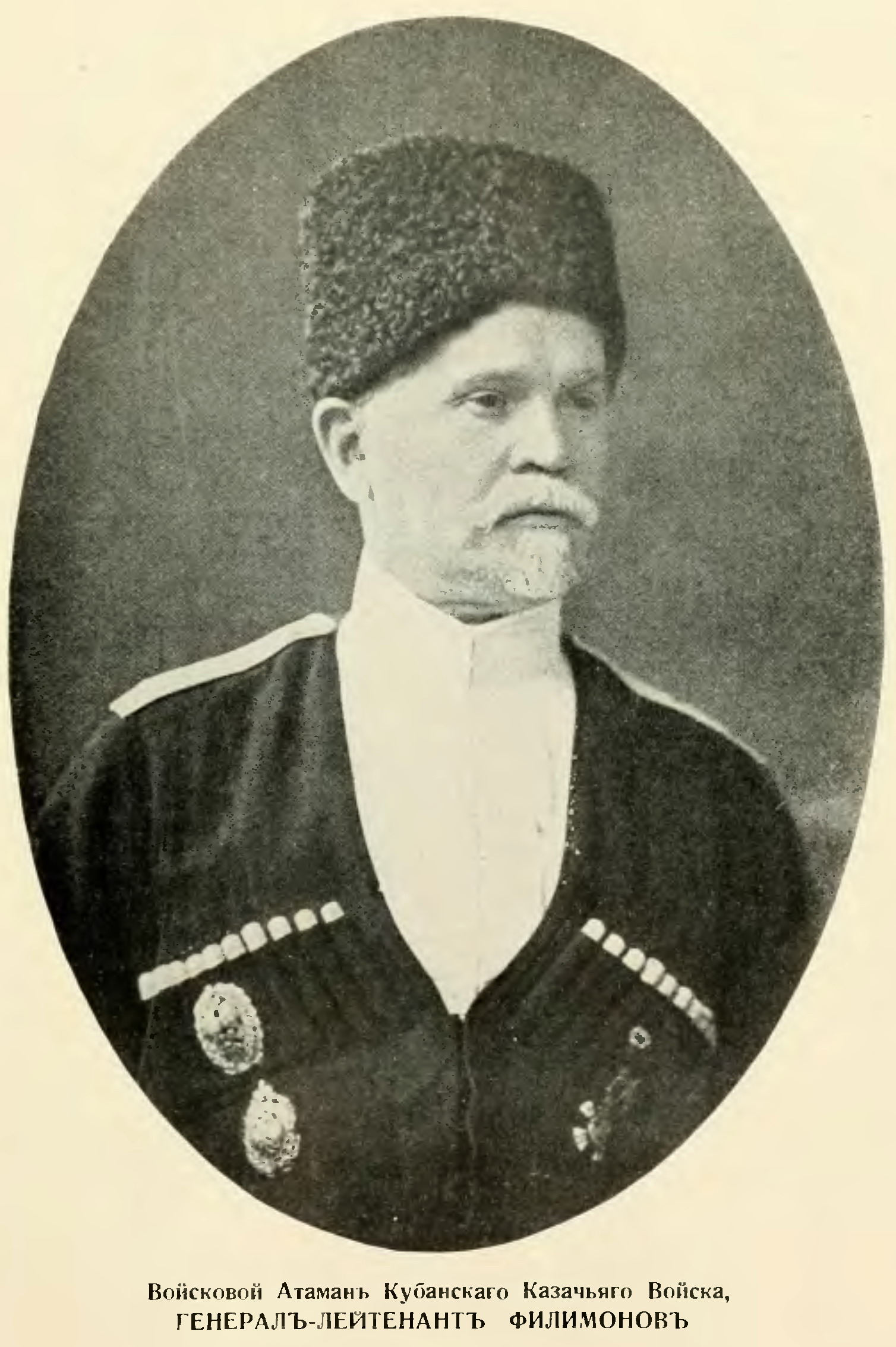
- Born: 14 September 1866; Grigoropolisskaya stanitsa, Kuban oblast, Russian Empire
- Died: 4 August 1948 (aged 81); Osijek, Yugoslavia (now Croatia)
- Military career
- Allegiance: Russian Empire; Kuban People's Republic; White movement
- Service years: 1884–1919
- Rank: Colonel (Imperial Russian Army); Ataman (Kuban Host); Lieutenant general (White movement)

Aleksandr Petrovich Filimonov (Russian: Александр Петрович Филимонов; 14 September [O.S. 2 September] 1866 – 4 August 1948) was the first Ataman of the anti-Bolshevik Kuban People's Republic from 1917 to 1919.

On 25 October 1917, he was elected Ataman. In December, in an effort to counter Bolshevism in the Kuban, Filimonov supported the formation of two volunteer units, one under Galaev and another under Viktor Pokrovsky.

He and his Kuban Cossacks joined the White Army during the Russian Civil War, but after disagreements with Anton Denikin, he stepped down as Ataman in December 1919, and emigrated to Yugoslavia.
