= Kuban Rada =

Order of Russian Cossacks

Coat of arms of the Kuban People's Republic

The Kuban Rada (Russian: Кубанская Радa, romanized: Kubanskaya Rada; Ukrainian: Кубанська Рада, romanized: Kubanska Rada) was the supreme organisation of the Kuban Cossacks, which represented all the heads of the districts. However, its head, Nakazny Ataman, was appointed by the Tsar directly. In April 1917, after the February Revolution, the Rada proclaimed itself as the supreme administration of the Kuban Oblast. On September 24, 1917, the Rada adopted a resolution on the formation of a legislature. After the October Revolution, the Rada fought against Soviet rule, and proclaimed the Kuban People's Republic on January 28, 1918, with its capital in Yekaterinodar.

According to Peter Kenez, "Filimonov and his fellow leaders placed their hopes on the Cossacks returning from the front, the frontoviki, believing that they would defend the status quo against the inogorodnye and the armies of Lenin and Trotsky." On 13 March, the rada, led by L. L. Bych as premier and N. S. Riabovol as speaker, was forced to evacuate Yekaterinodar. On 16 August, the Kuban rada was able to return after the successful Volunteer Army's Kuban Offensive. Yet in 1919, Anton Denikin was forced to disperse the rada because of its agitation for the formation of a separate army.
