= Ibrahim Gaydarov =

Ibrahim Bey Gaydarov
- Ибрагъим бей Гайдаров
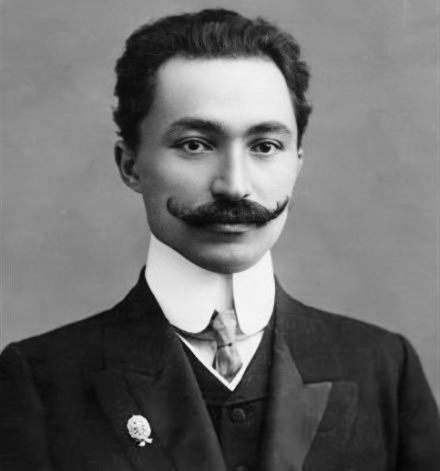

Deputy Minister of the Interior, Azerbaijan Democratic Republic
- In office 1920

Minister of Railways, Azerbaijan Democratic Republic
- In office 1919

Minister of Transport, Post and Telegraph, Mountain Republic
- In office 1918–1919
- Prime Minister: Abdulmajid Tapa Tchermoev; Pshemakho Kotsev
- Succeeded by
Parliamentary offices
Member of the Russian Constituent Assembly
In office 1917–?
Constituency	Transcaucasia
Member of the State Duma
In office 1907–1912
Constituency	Dagestan and Zakatal

Personal details
- Born: 1879 Derbent, Dagestan Oblast, Russian Empire
- Died: 1949 (aged 69–70) Ankara, Turkey
- Party: RSDLP (until 1910); Union of the Muslims of Russia (after 1910)
- Spouse: Nisa Khanum Arablinskaya
- Children: 4
- Education: St. Petersburg State Transport University

Ibrahim Bey Gaydarov (Lezgian: Ибрагъим бей Гайдаров; Russian: Ибрагим-бек Гайдаров; Azerbaijani: İbrahim bəy Heydərov) or İbrahim Haydaroğlu (Turkish: İbrahim Haydaroğlu) (August 3, 1879 – September 23, 1949) was a travel engineer, noble, nationalist activist and one of the Northern Caucasian intellectuals. In 1918–1919 he served as Minister of Transport, Post and Telegraph in the Mountainous Republic. In 1919 he participated in the Versailles Peace Conference in France.

== Biography ==
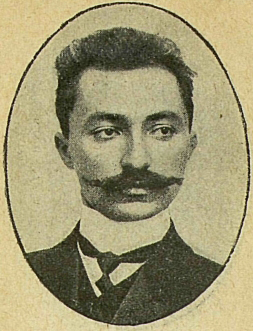
Gaydarov, 1909

=== Early life ===
Ibrahim-bek was born in a noble family, as the son of Isa-bek Gaydarov. He was a Lezgin Muslim noble, nationalist activist and one of the Northern Caucasian intellectuals, along with his brother Omar Bey.

After completing the best school of the region, Temir-Khan-Shura school in 1897, he entered the prestigious St. Petersburg State Transport University and graduated in 1907. After completing his studies and graduating, finally reaching great levels of education, Gaydarov returned to his homeland.

He worked as a communication engineer in Baku in various industries. Gaydarov, who was among the leaders of the Baku Society in 1907, was elected to the State Duma of the Russian Empire from the Dagestan region and the Zagatala region on October 14, 1907 at the age of 28 and went to Saint Petersburg. At first, Gaydarov, who had a Social Democratic ideology, first joined the Russian Social Democratic Labor Party in the Duma and took part in the Bolshevik faction of the Party. However, he left this party and joined the Muslim party, considering that the Russian Bolsheviks did not give any importance to the interests of the national minorities and had a negative view of Islam. He participated in the work of five commissions: agriculture, work, communication, budget and fisheries.

Returning to Baku after the completion of his duty to the Duma, Gaydarov assumed duties in many non-governmental organizations. He founded an oil company called "Deyanat" in order to gain funds in order to support Caucasians. He participated and played a big role in the charity organisations "Safa" and "Nijat". He also participated in organisastions teaching the Azerbaijani language and Islam to young children. After the February 1917 revolution and the overthrow of the Tsarist rule, he chaired the Transcaucasus Muslims Committee. Upon the appointment of the Transcaucasus Special Committee, he was appointed Commissar of Dagestan Region (April 5, 1917). He was elected as a member of the First Congress of Caucasian Muslims held in Baku.

=== Struggle for Caucasian independence ===
After the Mountainous Republic of the Northern Caucasus declared its independence, he joined them and contributed to the state affairs as an intellectual and worked for the development of the Caucasus.

In the newly formed Caucasus government, Gaydarov served as the Minister of Transport, Post and Telegraph. Together with a delegation headed by Abdulmajid Tapa Tchermoeff, they negotiated with the representatives of the Allied Forces to recognize the independence of the Caucasus. Gaydarov, an authorized representative of his government, signed an agreement with the Azerbaijan Republic on November 28, 1918. He was appointed to the same post by Pshemakho Kotsev, who succeeded him after Abdulmajid Tchermoeff resigned due to the obligation of Ottoman support forces to leave the Caucasus in accordance with the provisions of the Armistice of Mondros. In January 1919, he was assigned to the government delegation sent to the World Peace Conference in Paris to promote the independence of the North Caucasus to other countries.

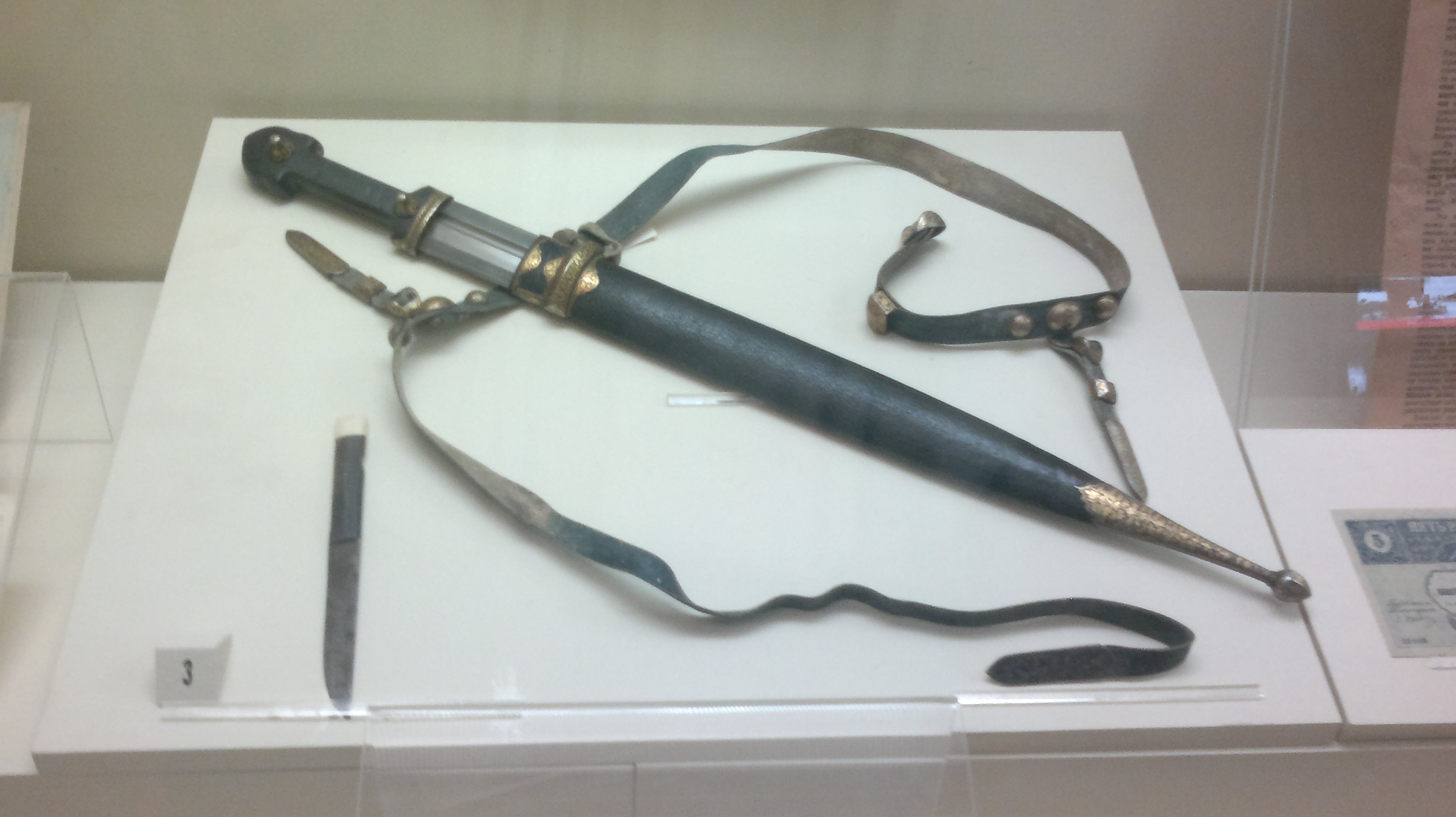
Gaydarov's dagger

He took part in the armed struggle against the reoccupation of Caucasus by the Russian White Army. In the spring of 1920, he was tricked and arrested in Baku, where he had to retreat after the Red Army invasion. After the hard efforts of the leader of Azerbaijan Bolsheviks and his old friend, Nariman Narimanov, he was temporarily appointed as the Deputy Minister of Internal Affairs, he managed to escape and went to Tbilisi. After Red Army invasion of Georgia, he went to France with his family.

=== Life in Turkey ===
Gaydarov came to Turkey where he was known as İbrahim Haydar upon the special invitation of Mustafa Kemal Atatürk in 1925 and he helped the Ankara-Kayseri railway construction. He, then, worked in various sections of the Sivas railway. He proved himself at the construction of railways in Turkey itself not only as a skilled professional, at the same time as a scientist. He predicted shift in the wind of Turkey with the rise of racism and in order to promote the Caucasus, he translated books from Russian into Turkish in 1937, released in Istanbul. In the winter of 1939, he went to Ankara as a result of the loss of his young colleagues in Erzincan earthquake. In the period from 1940 until his death he served high positions in the Republic of Turkey Ministry of Railways.

Gaydarov, who was married to Nisa Hanım, had one boy and three daughters. Gaydarov, who was a member of the High Scientific Council of Turkey, died in Ankara on 20 March 1949 and was buried in Cebeci cemetery.

== Ties with freemasons ==
There are sources, especially in Russian, claiming he may have been a freemason, or at least he may have had ties with the freemasons, meaning he was among the secret elite society. Sources go on to claim that he may have had ties with the Grande Loge de France, especially in 1924 with the Parisian lodge "Golden Fleece" No. 536, in 1926 Prometheus" lodge No. 558, from 1928 to 1936 lodge "Astrea" No. 500. Azerbaijani and other Muslim Caucasian sources have mostly denied these claims.
