= Sheykhzamanli =

Sheykhzamanli (Azerbaijani: Şeyxzamanlı) is an Azerbaijani surname.

Notable people with this surname include:

- Naghi Sheykhzamanli (1883–1967), Azerbaijani politician
- Mammadbaghir Sheykhzamanli (1880–1920), Azerbaijani politician
