= Nurmammad bey Shahsuvarov =

Azerbaijani politician

Nurmammad bey Shahsuvarov Həmid bəy Şahtaxtinski
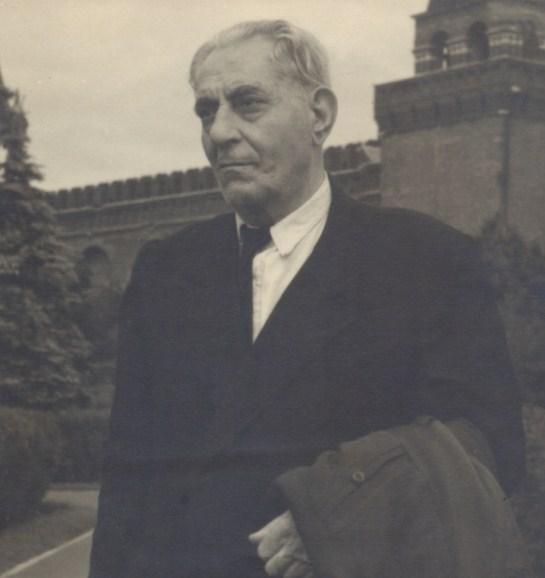
- Nurmammad portrait

Minister of Education and Religious Affairs of Azerbaijan Democratic Republic (ADR)
- In office March 5, 1920 – April 1, 1920
- President: Nasib Yusifbeyli Prime Minister, (Chairman of Azerbaijani Parliament)
- Preceded by: Hamid bey Shahtakhtinski
- Succeeded by: office terminated

Personal details
- Born: 1883 Minkend, Lachin, Azerbaijan
- Died: 1958 (aged 74–75) Baku, Azerbaijan

Nurmammad bey Shahsuvarov Adilkhan oglu (Azerbaijani: Nurməmməd bəy Adilxan bəy oğlu Şahsuvarov; 1883–1958) was an Azerbaijani statesman who served as Minister of Education and Religious Affairs in the fifth cabinet of Azerbaijan Democratic Republic, and was member of Parliament of Azerbaijan.

== Early years ==
Shahsuvarov was born in 1883 in Minkend of Lachin district, Azerbaijan. In 1903, he graduated from Transcaucasian Teachers Seminary and taught Russian language in Ganja for several years. He then graduated from Tiflis Alexander Pedagogical Institute in 1912 and Law Department of Kiev University in 1915. He was a participant of February Revolution of 1917 and became the Minister of Education of Mountainous Republic of the Northern Caucasus, established in the summer of 1918.

== Political life ==
In June, 1919 Shahsuvarov moved to Azerbaijan and joined Ittihad Party. He was then appointed Deputy Minister of Education. Under his leadership, many schools were opened in villages and towns of Azerbaijan. On March 5, 1920, he was appointed Minister of Education in the fifth cabinet of Azerbaijan Democratic Republic led by Nasib Yusifbeyli, effectively replacing Hamid bey Shahtakhtinski who resigned from his position to teach at Baku State University. His term ended on April 1, 1920, when the last fifth government dissolved.

After Bolshevik invasion of Azerbaijan, Shahsuvarov was appointed Deputy Education Commissar of Azerbaijan SSR. In 1940, he was arrested with false accusation and sent to Krasnodar repression camp. He was released in 1943 and returned to Baku where he worked as the Professor of Russian language at Baku Medical University from 1946 to 1958 and Azerbaijan State Oil Academy, was a Dean of Russian Language Department at Baku State University. He died on August 11, 1958, in Baku.

== See also ==
- Azerbaijani National Council
- Cabinets of Azerbaijan Democratic Republic (1918-1920)
- Current Cabinet of Azerbaijan Republic
