= Ali Hasanov (disambiguation) =

Ali Hasanov (born 1976) is an Azerbaijani artist and filmmaker.

Ali Hasanov may also refer to:

- Ali S. Hasanov (born 1948), Azerbaijani politician
- Ali M. Hasanov (born 1960), Azerbaijani professor and politician
- Aliagha Hasanov (1871–1933), or Ali Aga Hasanov, Azerbaijani statesman
