= Rashid Khan Kaplanov =

Azerbaijani politician (1883–1937)

Rashid Khan Gaplanov Rəşid Xan Qaplanov
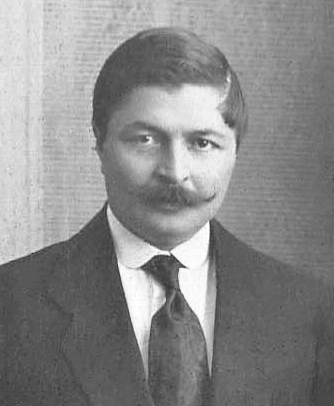
- Rashid Khan Kaplanov

Minister of Finance of Azerbaijan Democratic Republic (ADR)
- In office 22 December 1919 – 1 April 1920
- President: Nasib bey Yusifbeyli Prime Minister, (Chairman of Azerbaijani Parliament)
- Preceded by: Ali Agha Hasanov
- Succeeded by: office terminated

Minister of Education and Religious Affairs of Azerbaijan Democratic Republic (ADR)
- In office 14 April 1919 – 22 December 1919
- Preceded by: Nasib Yusifbeyli
- Succeeded by: Hamid bey Shahtakhtinski

Minister of Internal Affairs of Mountainous Republic of the Northern Caucasus
- In office 15 December 1918 – March 19
- Preceded by: Pshemakho Kotsev
- Succeeded by: office terminated

Personal details
- Born: 1883 Aksay, Khasavyurtovsky District, Dagestan, Russian Empire
- Died: 1937 (aged 53–54) Moscow, Russian SFSR, USSR

Rashid Khan Zavid oghlu Gaplanov (Kumyk: Raşit-han Zabitni ulanı Qaplan, Azerbaijani: Rəşid xan Zavid oğlu Qaplanov, Russian: Рашид хан Завитович Капланов; 1883–1937), also known as Rashit-han Gaplanov, was a North Caucasian-Azerbaijani statesman of Kumyk ethnicity who served as the Minister of Finance and Minister of Education and Religious Affairs in the fifth and fourth cabinets of Azerbaijan Democratic Republic.

== Early years ==
Kaplanov was born to a royal Kumyk biy family in the village of Aksay, currently in Khasavyurtovsky District, Dagestan. His family traced its origin to Soltan-Mut of Endirey, a prince of the house of Shamkhals.

He completed his secondary education in a Vladikavkaz Realny School. In 1910 he graduated from the Law Department of Sorbonne University. He then taught at Istanbul University in Turkey. In 1913, he returned to Vladikavkaz and worked as an attorney in a regional court.

== Political career ==
In 1917-1918, he became one of the key founders of the Mountainous Republic of the Northern Caucasus, where he held several ministerial positions within its government. After Denikin forces invaded the State bringing them under Russian rule, Kaplanov moved to Baku, Azerbaijan in early 1919.

In Baku, Gaplanov joined Ahrar Party and was elected to the Azerbaijani Parliament. When the fourth cabinet of Azerbaijan Democratic Republic was formed on 14 April 1919 under Prime Minister Nasib Yusifbeyli, he was appointed the Minister of Education and Religious Affairs. As the Minister of Education, he played an important role in establishing institutions of higher education in Azerbaijan, among them the largest Baku State University, where he also taught a course on Ottoman literature himself. He reportedly increased funding for the university to AZM 5 million to open a Philology and Medicine departments. In 1919, Gaplanov arranged funding for 100 Azerbaijani students to study at universities abroad. He also spearheaded establishment of State Commission on General Education Reforms which eventually introduced the Azerbaijani alphabet based on Latin script. Gaplanov remained in the office until December 22 of the same year, when the new fifth government was formed, where he took the position of Minister of Finance. He served as Minister of Finance until 1 April 1920.

After the Red Army invasion of Azerbaijan on 28 April 1920, Azerbaijan Democratic Republic ceased to exist. Gaplanov was subsequently arrested in June 1920 along with many Azerbaijani statesmen and sent to Moscow prison. He was later released and taught a course on Turkish History at the Moscow Institute of Oriental Studies. Gaplanov was arrested as a part of the Great Purge on 8 October 1937 and imprisoned at Butyrskaya and then Lefortovo prisons. He was executed on 10 December 1937.

== Family ==
His parents were Zavid Kaplan-Hajiyevich Kaplanov (1838-1914) — one of the largest landowners in Dagestan — and Aybala Ozdeadjieva.

He had a younger brother named Ibrahim (Irbay) Kaplanov/Kaplanoff (1887-1948), who in 1918 commanded the Kumyk Cavalry Regiment of the Mountainous Republic, and later fought in the White Army of Denikin. After the defeat of the Whites, he emigrated to the United States, married American heiress Vernon Marguerite Siems Haskell (née Magoffin), and died in 1947.

His younger sister Najabat (1886-1979) was married to Temirbolat (Fyodor) Bekovich-Cherkassky (1870-1953), also the Kumyk biy (prince) and last Military Governor of Kabarda.

Rashid-khan himself was married to Olga Efimovna Arshon (1886-1964), a Jewish student of the medical faculty of the Sorbonne University. His father was furious and disinherited him because of the choice, but they made amends after three years.

With Olga Arshon he had:

- son: Murad Kaplanov (1915-1980) — Soviet scientist, chief designer of the first Soviet space communication systems; married to Liliana Rambakh (1918-1999), issue
  - grandson: Rashid Kaplanov (1949-2007) — President of the European Association for Jewish Studies (EAJS) (2002-2006)
- daughter: Fatma Okuneva (1911-1992) — married to Yuri Mazel (1896-1938) and then Israel Okunev (1911-1963), had issue.

== See also ==
- Azerbaijani National Council
- Cabinets of Azerbaijan Democratic Republic (1918-1920)
