= Tarikh =

Arabic word for annals, history or historiography

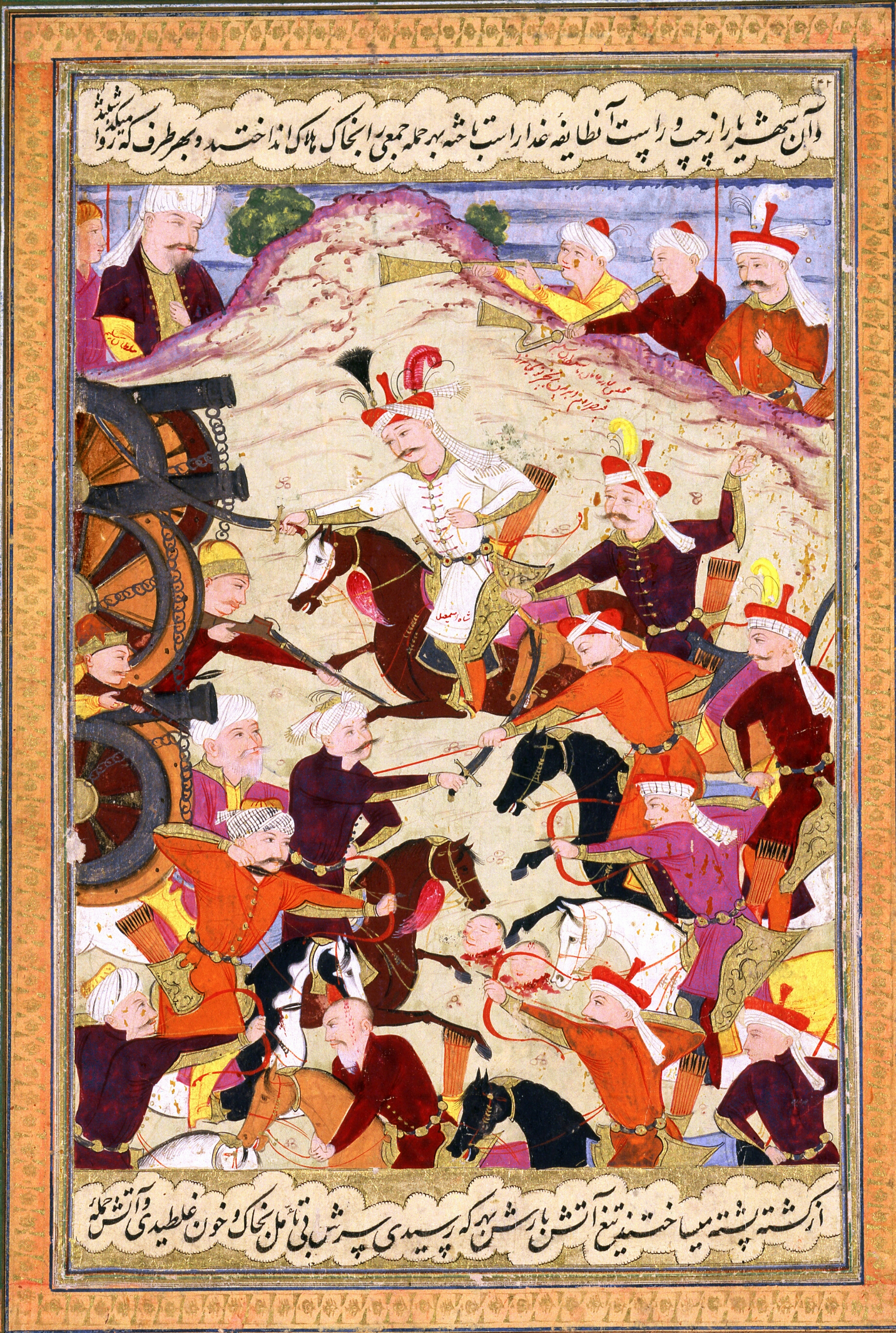
Illustration of Ismail I at the 1514 Battle of Chaldiran from the Tarikh-i Jahangusha-yi Khaqan Sahibqiran ('History of the World Conqueror and Khagan, Master of the Conjunction;' 1680s).

Tarikh (Arabic: تاريخ, romanized: tārīkh) is an Arabic word meaning "date, chronology, era", whence by extension "annals, history, historiography". It is also used in Persian, Urdu, Bengali and the Turkic languages. It is found in the title of many historical works. Prior to the 19th century, the word referred strictly to writing of or knowledge about history, but in modern Arabic it is, like the English word "history", equivocal and may refer either to past events themselves or their representations.

The word taʾrīkh is not of Arabic origin and this was recognized by Arabic philologists already in the Middle Ages. The derivation they proposed—that the participle muʾarrakh, "dated", comes from the Persian māh-rōz, "month-day"—is incorrect. Modern lexicographers have proposed an unattested Old South Arabian etymon for the plural tawārīkh, "datings", from the Semitic root for "moon, month". The Ge'ez term tārīk, "era, history, chronicle", has occasionally been proposed as the root of the Arabic term, but in fact is derived from it.

The word first appears in the titles of certain 8th-century works and by the 9th century it was the standard word of the genre of these works. The word akhbār, "reports, narratives", is a synonym and was also used in the titles of works. It may even be an older word than taʾrīkh. The word taʾrīkh was never universal in the titles of works of history, which were just as often identified by subject matter (i.e., biography, conquests, etc.) as by genre. As its etymology implies, taʾrīkh originally described only a strictly chronological account, but it soon came to refer to any kind of history (e.g. historical dictionaries).

== List of works ==
The following are the names of prominent books with taʾrīkh in the title, in Arabic, Persian or Turkish. (The list is alphabetized, ignoring particles "-i", "al-", etc.)

- Tarikh Abul Fida
- Tarikh Ahlul Hadith
- Tārīkh-i amniyya, a history of the Dungan Revolt, the magnum opus of Musa Sayrami
- Tarikh ibn al-Athir
- Tarikh Baghdad
- Tarikh al-fattash
- Tarikh-i Hind Wa Sind
- Tarikh al-inqilab fi Daghistan
- Tarikh al-Islam al-kabir
- Tarikh ibn Kathir
- Tarikh al-Khulafa
- Tarikh al-Rusul wa al-Muluk
- al-Taʾrīkh al-sharqī
- Tarikh-i Sistan
- Tarikh al-Sudan
- Tarikh al-Tabari
- Al-Kamil fi al-Tarikh
- Tarikh-e Jevdet

== See also ==
- List of Muslim historians
