= Mountainous Republic of the Northern Caucasus =

1918–1919 independent state in the North Caucasus

United Republics of the North Caucasus
- 1918 (Note: The Union of the Peoples of the North Caucasus was established within the Russian Republic in May 1917 and transformed into a republic in November 1917. It declared independence on 11 May 1918.)–1919
- Flag Coat of arms (Note: Adopted by the first Confederation of Mountain Peoples, May 1917)

- Fully controlled territories Partially controlled territories Claimed territories controlled by other states
- Capital: Temir-Khan-Shura
- Common languages: Russian (official language and lingua franca) North Caucasian languages: Abaza; Avar; Chechen; Dargwa; Ingush; Kabardian; Karachay-Balkar; Kumyk; Lezgian; Nogai; Ossetic; Rutulian; Tabasaran; Others
- Religion: Sunni Islam (majority and official state religion); Russian Orthodox Church (minority)
- Demonym: North Caucasian
- Government: Confederal parliamentary republic under a provisional government
- Prime Minister
  - 11 May 1918 – December 1918: Tapa Tchermoeff
  - December 1918 – 12 May 1919: Pshemakho Kotsev

Establishment
- History
  - Union of the Peoples of the Northern Caucasus declared within Russia: 6 March 1917
  - Entrance into the South-Eastern Union of Cossack Troops, Highlanders of the Caucasus and Free Peoples of the Steppes: 20 October 1917
  - Formation of the Provisional Terek-Dagestan Government: 1 December 1917
  - Red Army invasion and exile: January–March 1918
  - Independence declared: 11 May 1918
  - Ottoman campaign in Dagestan and re-establishment: September–November 1918
  - White Army invasion of Dagestan and dissolution: May 1919
  - Replaced by North Caucasian Emirate and Security Council of the Northern Caucasus and Dagestan: September 1919
  - Established: 1918 (Note: The Union of the Peoples of the North Caucasus was established within the Russian Republic in May 1917 and transformed into a republic in November 1917. It declared independence on 11 May 1918.)
  - Disestablished: 1919

Area
  - Total: 430,874 km^{2} (166,361 sq mi)

Population
  - 1919 census: 4,221,860
- Currency: Tumen
Preceded by	Succeeded by
Russian Republic	North Caucasian Emirate; Security Council of the Northern Caucasus and Dagestan
- Today part of: Russia; Azerbaijan; Georgia

The Mountainous Republic of the Northern Caucasus (MRNC), also referred to as the United Republics of the North Caucasus, Mountain Republic, (Note: Russian: Горская республика; Chechen: Ламанхойн республика; Iron Ossetic: Хæххон республикæ; Lezgian: Сувун Республика; Ingush: Лоамарой Республика) or the Republic of the Mountaineers, was a short-lived transcontinental state in Eurasia. It encompassed the eastern portion of the North Caucasus and emerged during the Russian Civil War. It existed from 1918 to 1919 and formed as a consolidation of various North Caucasian ethnic groups, including the Abazins, Balkars, Chechens, Circassians, Dagestanis, Ingush, Karachays and Ossetians.

The MRNC encompassed the former territories of Terek Oblast and Dagestan Oblast within the Russian Empire. These territories now constitute the present-day republics of Chechnya, Ingushetia, North Ossetia–Alania, Kabardino-Balkaria, Dagestan, and a portion of Stavropol Krai in the Russian Federation. Spanning approximately 430,874 square kilometers (166,361 sq mi), the MRNC had a population of approximately 11.2 million. Throughout its existence, the capital of the MRNC relocated from Vladikavkaz to Nazran and ultimately settled in Temir-Khan-Shura.

The MRNC broke away from Russia after the October Revolution. The Russian Volunteer Army captured the state in May 1919, and it ceased to exist. However, in September 1919, the North Caucasian Emirate was proclaimed as the successor of the Mountain Republic. It was captured by Soviet Russia in August 1920, which led to an uprising. In April 1921, the Mountain Autonomous Soviet Socialist Republic was established by the Bolsheviks within the RSFSR, but the uprising lasted until 1925.

== History ==
=== Background ===
The February Revolution brought significant changes to the political structure of the North Caucasus. The military-civil administration of the viceroyalty was abolished and replaced by a purely civilian bodies, such as the Terek Regional Civilian Executive Committee in the Terek region. However, the new authorities soon became largely irrelevant in the face of competition from various bodies of popular representation. These included autonomous local councils established by the region's various ethnic groups, as well as soviets of workers, peasants, and soldiers, which were concentrated mainly in Russian-populated urban areas. Approximately forty stable national-territorial units emerged, demanding extensive autonomy but not yet seeking secession from Russia.

=== Union of the Peoples of the North Caucasus ===
Weeks after the revolution, in March 1917, representatives of the region's emerging national intelligentsias met to prepare for the establishment of a federation of the peoples of the North Caucasus, known as the Union of the Peoples of the North Caucasus.

In May 1917, approximately 300 delegates and guests representing the region's various ethnic groups, including the Cossack communities, among them Terek Cossack ataman Mikhail Aleksandrovich Karaulov, met in Vladikavkaz to establish the Union of the Mountaineers of the North Caucasus and Dagestan. The assembly elected Abdulmajid Tapa Tchermoev, a Chechen former tsarist officer and oil magnate, as chairman of its seventeen-member Central Committee, which became the Union's principal executive body. The congress also established a separate muftiate for the North Caucasus for the first time and elected Nazhmuddin Gotsinskii, an Avar Muslim scholar and leader of the Union's religious faction, as mufti and supreme spiritual authority of the North Caucasus. A religious section was established within the Union, consisting of a group of religious scholars tasked with determining the role of Islam in the new political organization. It declared, as a matter of principle, that relations among Muslims would be regulated by Sharia, although it did not define what this would entail. The section also departed from classical Islamic teachings by declaring that women could participate in political life and hold public office. It further called on Russia to appoint its own Shaykh al-Islam to oversee the spiritual affairs of all Russian Muslims, with the mufti of the North Caucasus serving under him.

During the congress, delegates emphasized the similarities among the peoples of the North Caucasus, explicitly including non-Muslim groups such as the Christian Ossetians. The assembly also established a special education committee headed by the Dagestani scholar Said Ibragimovich Gabiev and adopted measures aimed at promoting the culture of the non-Russian peoples of the Caucasus. These included introducing education in the North Caucasian languages from the first year of primary school, followed by instruction in Russian, Arabic, and Turkish in later years. Russian was designated as the official language of the Union.

The congress held in May 1917 expressed its intention to participate in a new democratic, federal Russian state with autonomous rights and sent telegrams to the Russian Provisional Government affirming its commitment to a federal structure for Russia. The Union of the Peoples of the Northern Caucasus adopted a political platform and program declaring itself an "inseparable integral part of the Great Russian State." Its speakers professed loyalty to Russia and sought to "defend the democracy and liberty won by the February Revolution." The Union declared its fundamental aim to be participation in the work of the Russian Constituent Assembly and the construction of a new federative and democratic Russia on an equal footing with its other constituent parts. The Mountaineers pledged allegiance to the Provisional Government in Petrograd and supported the continuation of the war against the Central Powers.

The Union's second congress, held in the Dagestani mountain village of Andi in September 1917, revealed the first significant tensions between its secularist and Islamist factions. Gotsinskii persuaded the Union to select the remote village as the site of the congress, arguing that the Dagestani highlands were particularly appropriate for the mountaineers to deliberate. In practice, however, Andi was also a stronghold of his influence, allowing him to exert considerable control over the proceedings. Representatives of the Chechen and Dagestani clergy advocated the establishment of a theocracy, but most members of the Central Committee opposed the idea. Several days before the congress, a large gathering took place in Vedeno, Chechnya, where Gotsinskii was proclaimed imam of the North Caucasus and envisioned as the spiritual and political head of a future theocratic North Caucasian state, or imamate. He was supported in this move by Sheikh Usun-Khadzhi, an Avar religious scholar. Secular-minded delegates of the Union, however, opposed granting Gotsinskii the title of "imam" and insisted that he instead be styled "mufti." They argued that the establishment of an imamate would alienate the Orthodox and ethnically Slavic populations of the North Caucasus. Ultimately, Gotsinskii backed down and agreed to use the title "mufti," although he continued to advocate the application of Sharia law. Many of his followers, as well as Usun-Khadzhi, nevertheless continued to refer to him as imam.

Another congress of the Union was held on 3 October 1917, bringing together up to 1,500 delegates. The congress adopted a constitution providing for a bicameral legislature and a constitutional court. It also established a system of "military-Sharia" courts in response to the Provisional Government's inability to maintain order, authorized the Central Committee to establish an army, and prohibited the export of essential goods.

=== Alliance with the Cossacks and Growing Disorder ===
After the Bolsheviks seized power in Petrograd, the Union's Central Committee declared autonomy in response and elevated the Union's status to that of a republic, while the committee began referring to itself as a "government." Nevertheless, later that month, it reaffirmed its commitment to "preserve federative Russia as united, indivisible, and great" and to the convocation of the All-Russian Constituent Assembly.

Lacking significant armed forces of its own, the Union relied primarily on former Imperial Russian officers of North Caucasian origin, including Prince Nukh Bek Shamkhal Tarkovskii and the ethnic Dagestani Rusul Bek Koitbekov. Although these officers placed their forces in Dagestan under the authority of the Union's government from the outset, they never formally transferred command to it. The Union also lacked armed forces in the Terek region. Consequently, its leadership sought to consolidate its position in October 1917 by joining the South-Eastern Union of Cossack Troops, Highlanders of the Caucasus and Free Peoples of the Steppes. Members of the Union's government participated in the founding session of the South-Eastern Union, a loose anti-Bolshevik alliance. In December 1917, the Union of Mountaineers established a joint government with the Terek Cossacks in Vladikavkaz, Provisional Terek-Dagestan Government. They formed the Interim Military Committee of the Terek Region. Cossack units and veterans of the former Caucasian Native Cavalry Division were designated to provide local security.

Meanwhile, the situation in the region had begun to deteriorate in the summer of 1917 and was further exacerbated by the return of former soldiers from the First World War front, many of whom became involved in banditry, pillaging, and marauding. Rising ethnic tensions led to clashes between Chechens and Cossacks, Ingush and Ossetians, and other groups. At the center of these tensions was the land question: most mountaineers lacked sufficient land and demanded its redistribution, while the Cossacks opposed such measures. To prevent land expropriation, the Cossacks initially aligned themselves with the Union of Mountaineers, while the Union sought to incorporate the Cossacks in order to increase its political weight vis-à-vis the central government. The South-Eastern Union pressured the Terek and Kuban Cossacks to make some territorial concessions, but Cossacks along the Sunzha River resented both these concessions and the inclusion of Chechens and Ingush in the alliance. Neither the rank and file of the Cossack nor mountaineer communities accepted the rapprochement. The formation of the joint Terek-Dagestani government was unpopular among both mountaineers and Cossacks, particularly Chechens and Ingush, and its authority was effectively confined to the area around Vladikavkaz. Real power increasingly passed to local communities, city councils, auls, and the spiritual leaders of Muslim communities. The first session of the Chechen People in March 1917 had elected delegates to the Union of Mountaineers and established a Chechen National Council. However, at the second session, held in Urus-Martan in early 1918, the Chechen assembly voted against joining the Mountain Republic. In December 1917, Mikhail Karaulov was ambushed and killed in the stanitsa of Prokhladnaya by Cossacks who opposed his policy of rapprochement with the mountaineers, fearing that their leader was "selling them out" to the mountaineers. In an effort to curb Chechen raids on Cossack settlements, Gotsinskii appealed to the mullahs of the North Caucasus to restore law and order on the basis of Sharia. He authorized his representatives to impose punishments, including the amputation of the hands of Muslims convicted of crimes against the property or persons of others, as well as the death penalty. These measures failed to produce significant results, and by the autumn of 1917 the region had descended into widespread disorder.

=== Red Army Invasion and Government in Exile ===
Under these circumstances, it was not difficult for the Red Army to dislodge the Mountain Republic's government from the North Caucasus in early 1918. As early as January, the Bolsheviks established the Stavropol Soviet Republic, followed in mid-March by the Black Sea Soviet Republic and in April by the Kuban Soviet Republic. A week later, the latter two were merged to form the Soviet Republic of Kubano–Chernomorsk. The Cossacks increasingly aligned themselves with the Bolsheviks, and in January a joint Bolshevik-Cossack force invaded the North Caucasus. From 25 to 31 January 1918, the Bolsheviks convened the First Terek People's Congress in Mozdok, which elected the Terek People's Council as the supreme body of Soviet power in the region. In March, Bolshevik forces captured Vladikavkaz with the assistance of Cossack units. The Mountain Republic's government initially relocated to Temir-Khan-Shura in Dagestan and later moved to Tiflis, Georgia, in April 1918. There, its officials sought negotiations with the South Caucasian Commissariat with the aim of forming political union of the South and North Caucasian governments. Such a union was expected to make it easier to deliver aid from the Ottoman Empire to the mountaineers, given the geographic proximity of the South Caucasus, while also creating a stronger state. The Ottomans likewise favored the proposal, as it would provide them with a stronger buffer state. However, the South Caucasian Commissariat failed to reach a consensus on the proposed merger and refused to accept the territorial concessions to the Ottomans made by Soviet Russia in the Treaty of Brest-Litovsk, instead deciding to continue the war against the Ottoman Empire. On 11 May 1918, while in exile in Istanbul, the Mountaineer Republic formally declared its independence. It soon concluded a treaty of friendship with the Ottoman Empire, with the Ottomans promising assistance, but its alliance with the Ottomans was driven primarily by geopolitical considerations rather than religious affinity. The shift toward independence was largely a consequence of the Bolshevik Revolution and the ensuing Russian Civil War.

After the Bolsheviks expelled the Terek-Dagestani government from Pyatigorsk, they held a constituent session of the Terek Soviet Republic, later moving it to Vladikavkaz after capturing the city. However, despite establishing control over the region, Soviet power had yet to be consolidated in the non-Russian rural areas, as the Bolsheviks lacked strong party organizations there and relied largely on individual personalities and their local power bases. Although the Cossacks initially sided with the Bolsheviks, it soon became clear that they had done so primarily to defeat their mountaineer opponents. In April and May 1918, during the third session of the Terek People's Congress in Grozny, the Bolsheviks sought to secure the genuine support of the Chechens and Ingush, fearing a revolt by the "landless mountaineers." The congress approved the transfer of land to the Chechens and Ingush and the resettlement of a number of Cossacks from the Terek region, establishing the first precedent for Cossack deportations. The decision to side with the Chechens and Ingush was motivated by the personal sympathies of individual high-ranking Bolsheviks and their ideological convictions, as well as by pragmatic considerations: they sought to win the support of the mountaineer population amid threats to their rule in the region from the White Army advancing from the Don and from German and Ottoman forces in the south.

These policies prompted the Cossacks, under the leadership of the ethnic Ossetian Menshevik general Georgii Bicherakhov, to rise in rebellion in July 1918, joined by approximately 12,000 Cossacks. In August, Cossack and allied Ossetian forces captured Vladikavkaz, but were driven out a week later by Bolshevik forces allied with the Ingush. The rebels then attempted to capture Grozny, which came under siege for three months but successfully withstood the assault. Following these defeats, Georgii Bicherakhov's forces withdrew to Dagestan, where they joined the troops of his brother, Lazar Bicherakhov. Lazar's forces had advanced from Baku into Dagestan in the summer of 1918 and, with British assistance, captured Derbent and Petrovsk-Port. Lazar also attempted to establish an alliance with Nukh Bek Tarkovskii, whose cavalry units were stationed at Temir-Khan-Shura in Dagestan. Meanwhile, the forces of Gotsinskii and Usun-Khadzhi operated in the mountains of Dagestan and Chechnya.

=== Ottoman Intervention and Re-establishment of the Republic ===
After the Ottoman army captured Baku, an Ottoman expeditionary corps led by Ismail Hakkı Berkok, an ethnic Circassian major in the Ottoman Army, advanced toward Dagestan. Most of its soldiers were North Caucasian émigrés who had fled to the Ottoman Empire after the Caucasian War. The expeditionary force sought to recruit local North Caucasians and defeat the Bolsheviks. In August, command of the Ottoman forces in the North Caucasus was transferred to Ottoman Major General Yusuf Izzet Pasha, who was also of Circassian descent. The Mountain Republic succeeded in occupying Temir-Khan-Shura with Ottoman assistance, and the Ottomans appointed Tarkovskii as the Mountain Republic's representative in Dagestan. After the Ottoman 15th Division captured Derbent, a joint Mountaineer-Ottoman ceremony was held at the town hall on 13 October to celebrate the re-establishment of the North Caucasian republic, during which the republic's flag was raised. A decree by Chermoev reaffirmed the Mountain Republic's commitment to maintaining the liberal political order and emphasized the contractual and legal nature of Ottoman assistance, comparing it to German aid to Ukraine and Georgia. However, the Ottomans were soon officially defeated in the First World War. Nevertheless, unaware of the armistice, Ottoman forces achieved one final victory by defeating Lazar Bicherakhov's forces at Petrovsk-Port. The Ottoman forces were nevertheless soon forced to withdraw from the North Caucasus.

The Bolsheviks consolidated their rule in the North Caucasus in July 1918 by establishing the North Caucasian Soviet Republic in Ekaterinograd through the unification of the Soviet republics in the region, but the new republic proved short-lived. By September 1918, Anton Denikin's Volunteer Army had progressively eliminated Soviet power in the Don, Kuban, Stavropol, and Chernomorsk regions. Facing the White advance, the Bolsheviks attempted to negotiate with the Mountain Republic in late 1918. In November, the Terek Soviet Republic sent commissars to negotiate with the government of the Mountain Republic, but its terms were rejected, and the Mountain Republic's leaders no longer regarded the Bolsheviks as a formidable force.

=== White Army Occupation and Dissolution ===
After the Ottoman withdrawal, the British Empire emerged as the dominant foreign power in the North Caucasus and initially pledged its support to the Mountain Republic. However, following Denikin's conquest of the North Caucasus and the defeat of the Bolsheviks by early 1919, the British sought to avoid opposing Denikin's policies, regarding his army as the principal force capable of defeating the Bolsheviks and urging the Mountain Republic to cooperate with the Whites. Denikin, however, rejected any cooperation with the Mountain Republic. Pavel Nikolaevich Shatilov, a White general and commander of Denikin's forces in the Caucasus, sent an ultimatum to the newly appointed leader of the Mountain Republic, Pshemakho Kotsev, ordering him to submit to Denikin while offering limited self-government within Russia. The Mountain Republic sought an alliance with the Whites, but the proposal was firmly rejected.

While the Whites swiftly conquered the northwestern part of the North Caucasus, Kabarda and North Ossetia, they encountered fierce resistance in Chechnya and Ingushetia. This prompted the Whites to revive the scorched-earth tactics employed by Aleksey Yermolov in the nineteenth century, particularly in the mountainous areas. At a major assembly in Urus-Martan, the Chechens formally pledged submission, although the declaration did not reflect their actual position. Although the Mountain Republic had lost much of its authority among the local population as a result of its earlier cooperation with the Cossacks, its officials still retained sufficient influence to agitate against the White forces at Chechen assemblies and to represent the Chechens in negotiations with the Whites.

However, by May 1919, the Volunteer Army had advanced toward Petrovsk-Port and Derbent and captured both cities. Following Denikin's ultimatum, the Mountain Republic's government in Temir-Khan-Shura was dissolved. Members of the Kotsev government fled to Tiflis, Georgia, leaving only scattered armed groups to decide independently whether to continue fighting. Tarkovskii's forces withdrew into the highlands of Dagestan. The Kotsev government played no significant role in the North Caucasus thereafter. The Whites also captured members of the Dagestan Obkom of the RKP(b) and executed them in May 1919.

=== Subsequent Developments ===
Denikin's policies, which sought to restore the old regime, soon provoked opposition among the local population. This culminated in a revolt that began in Dagestan in June 1919 and spread across the mountainous regions of Dagestan, Chechnya, and Ingushetia, as well as Kabardia and Ossetia. The revolt also brought together Bolsheviks, initially led by Aslanbek Sheripov and, following his death, by Nikolai Gikalo, and Muslim clergy based in the mountains against the common enemy. Ottoman officers played a major role in the uprising, while Georgia and Azerbaijan also provided modest financial and military assistance. Officials of the Mountain Republic government also sought an alliance with the Muslim clergy, viewing it as the only viable basis for continuing the struggle against Denikin in the North Caucasus. In Tiflis, Georgia, representatives of the various anti-Denikin factions met at the initiative of the Kotsev government. An eleven-member group was appointed to lead the rebellion under the leadership of the ethnic Ossetian Akhmed Tsalikov. In October 1919, this body was transformed into the Dagestan Defence Council, a provisional coalition government comprising various anti-Denikin forces, including the Bolsheviks. It was dominated by spiritual leaders under the chairmanship of Sheikh Ali-Khadzhi Akunshinskii, the mufti of Dagestan. However, this alienated another mufti, Gotsinskii, who subsequently refused to participate in the uprising and condemned cooperation with the Bolsheviks, regarding their atheism as the greater threat. Another Islamist spiritual leader, Usun-Khadzhi, led a separate uprising, defeating the Whites in several engagements with Bolshevik assistance. In September 1919, he proclaimed the North Caucasian Emirate and appointed Prince Inaluk Arsanukaev Dyshninskii as grand vizier and supreme commander of its armed forces, with the government based in the Chechen village of Vedeno. The Sharia-based state was modeled on the state established by Shamil and received support from Georgia, Azerbaijan, and the Ottoman Empire, which sought to establish a buffer state in the North Caucasus. It also received pragmatic recognition from the Bolsheviks. Other rebel groups included the Committee to Expel the Gang of Bolsheviks and Usun-Khadzhi from Chechnia, led by Ibragim Chulikov, a representative of the liberal intelligentsia who was allied with Tapa Chermoev of the Mountain Republic.

In February–March 1920, the 11th Red Army arrived in the region and, together with the Muslim clergy, drove Denikin's forces from the Terek region and Dagestan, also liquidating the North Caucasian Emirate in the process. However, in an effort to avoid provoking further tensions with Usun-Khadzhi, the Bolsheviks offered him the position of mufti of the North Caucasus. He died shortly afterward. The Bolsheviks also succeeded in taking control of the Dagestan Defence Council from within. They initially retained Ali-Khadzhi Akushinskii in the government to avoid open conflict, but forced Gotsinskii into exile in the borderlands with Georgia. He continued to resist the Bolsheviks before being captured and executed in 1925.

Acknowledging the legacy of the unity projects that had emerged in the North Caucasus during the Civil War, the Bolsheviks initially established the Mountain Autonomous Soviet Socialist Republic in 1921, encompassing the entire North Caucasus except Dagestan. Moreover, for at least a short period, the Bolsheviks genuinely upheld freedom of religion in the North Caucasus.

== International relations ==
During the Brest-Litovsk negotiations, an effort was made to dispatch delegates to represent the Republic under Ottoman supervision. However, the Ottomans later declined this association due to an unfavorable response from the Bolsheviks. On 30 May 1918, the Bolshevik government issued a diplomatic note declaring their non-recognition of the MRNC. In March 1919, a delegation led by Tapa Tchermoeff and Ibrahim Bey Gaydarov went to Paris to participate in the Treaty of Versailles and sought international recognition of the Republic's independence.

The Republic received support from Said Shamil, the grandson of Imam Shamil, and gained international recognition from various countries, namely the Central Powers (Austria-Hungary, Germany, the Ottoman Empire and Bulgaria), Ukraine, Georgia, Armenia, Azerbaijan, the Kuban People's Republic, and the United Kingdom. The latter, however, would later form an alliance with Russian general Anton Denikin and make efforts to reinstate Tsarist rule in the region.

== Army ==
The Dagestan cavalry regiments, units within the Caucasian Native Cavalry Division, pledged their allegiance to the Mountainous Republic and Ottoman pashas of Circassian descent arrived with their forces to provide assistance. An army was formed and participated in confrontations against General Anton Denikin's Volunteer Army. With backing from the North Caucasus Army, led by Yusuf Izzet Pasha, the Caucasus region was captured from Soviet Russia in the Dagestan Campaign in 1918.

== Constituents ==
The Union consisted seven "states" distributed on a national basis and united under a confederative principle within the territories: Dagestan, Ingushetia, Chechnya, North Ossetia–Alania, Circassia (including West Circassia, although the union had control only over East Circassia), Karachay-Balkaria, the Nogai steppes. It also asserted claims in Abkhazia.

== Prominent government figures, 1917–1919 ==
The new republic established a government led by Prime Minister Tchermoev, Rashid Khan Kaplanov, and Haidar Bammate. The capital was initially Vladikavkaz but was later relocated to Temir-Khan-Shura after being occupied by the Red Army.

Following the conclusion of World War I and the withdrawal of Turkish troops, the Mountain government underwent reorganization. In late 1918, Pshemaho Kotsev was confirmed as leader of the coalition cabinet in the Mountain Congress held in Temir-Khan-Shura.

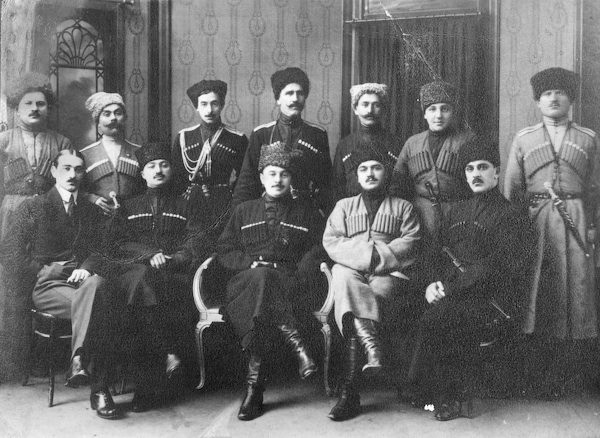
Leaders of the MRNC, with Prime Minister Tapa Tchermoeff seated in the center of the front row.

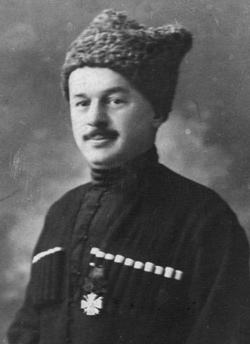
Abdulmajid Tapa Tchermoeff, oil industrialist, first chairman of the Central Committee and first prime minister, Chechen. Died in Switzerland in 1937.

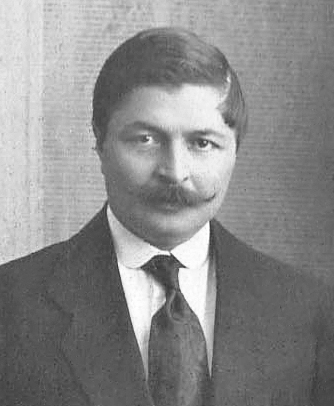
Rashid Khan Kaplanov, second Chairman of the Central Committee, Minister of the Interior. Assassinated by the Bolshevik government in 1937.

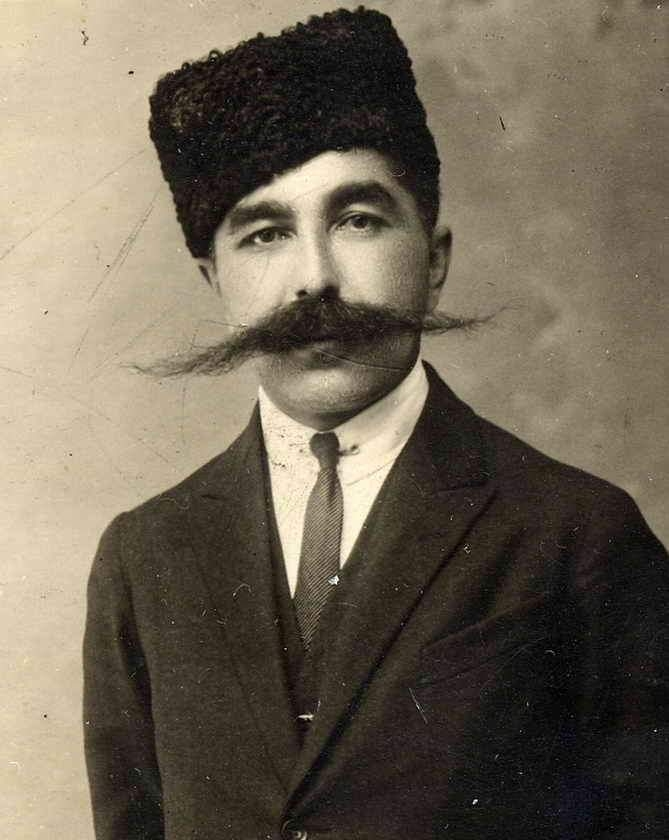
Pshemakho Kotsev, second prime minister, Kabardian Circassian. Died in Istanbul in 1962.

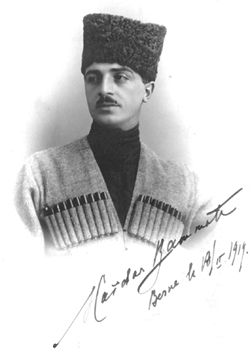
Haidar Bammate, Foreign Minister, Kumyk. Died in Paris in 1965.

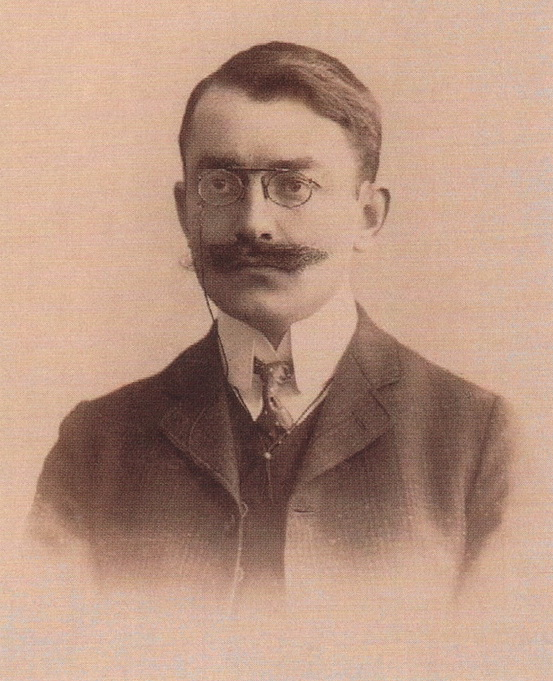
Vassan-Girey Jabagiyev, Minister of Finance, Ingush. Died in Istanbul in 1961.

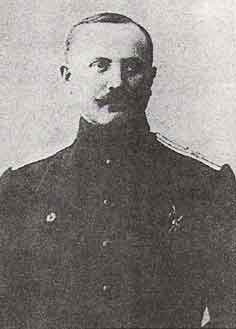
Nukh-bek Tarkovskiy, Military Minister, Kumyk. Died in Switzerland in 1951.

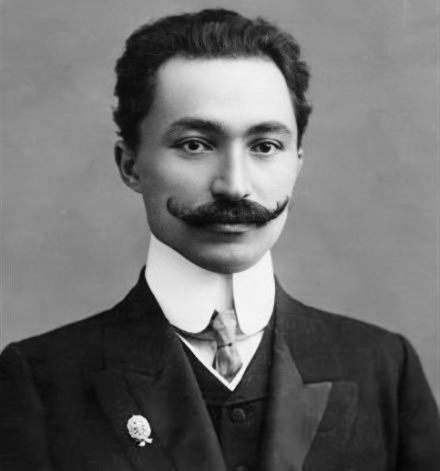
Ibrahim Bey Gaydarov, Minister of Posts and Telegraph, Lezgin. Died in Ankara in 1949.

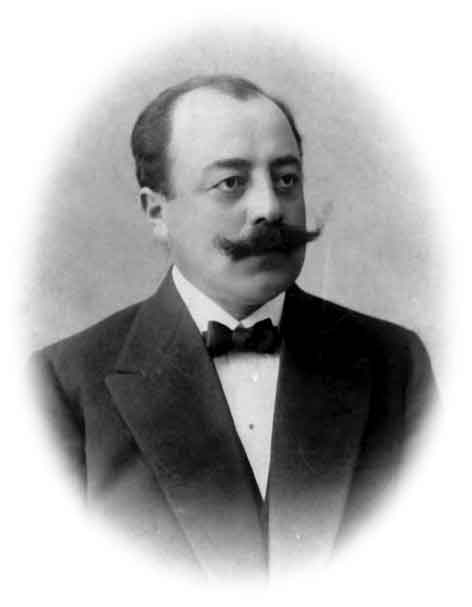
Adil-Gerey Daidbekov, Minister of Transportation, Kumyk. Died in Baku in 1946.

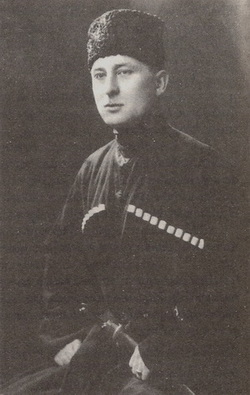
Alikhan Kantemir, the official representative in neighboring countries (Azerbaijan, Georgia), Muslim Ossetian. Died in Munich in 1963.

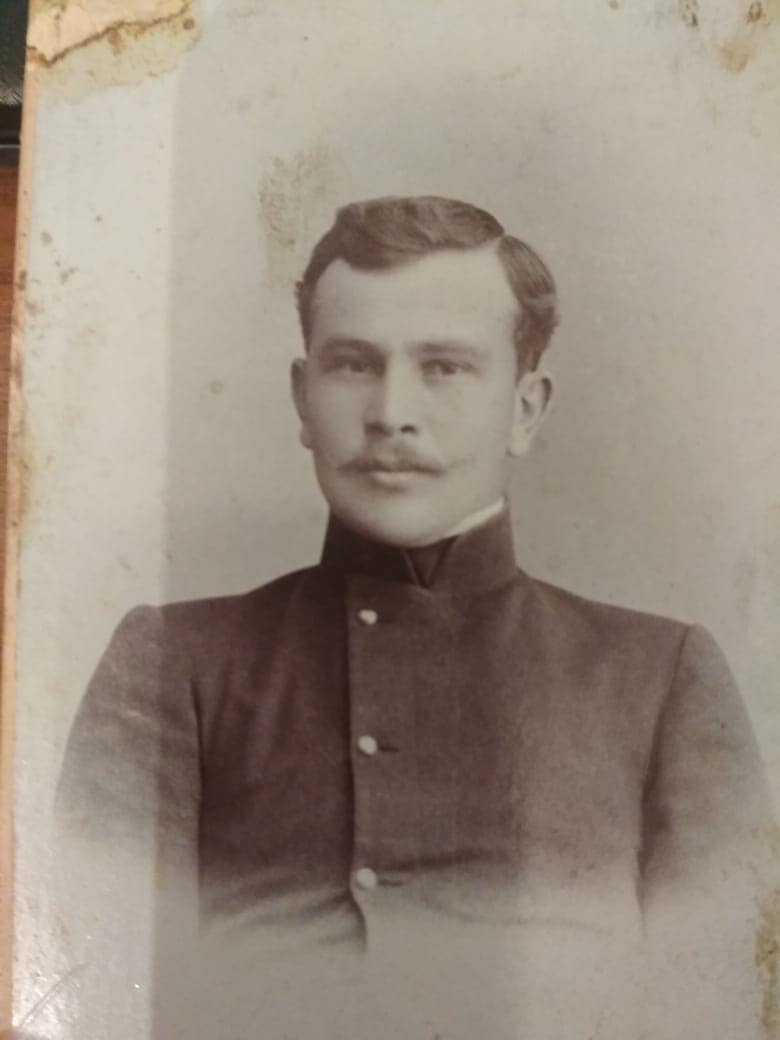
Tadjuddin Penzulayev, Minister of Justice, Kumyk. Killed by the Bolsheviks in 1937. Co-author of Mikhail Bulgakov's piece "Children of Mulla".

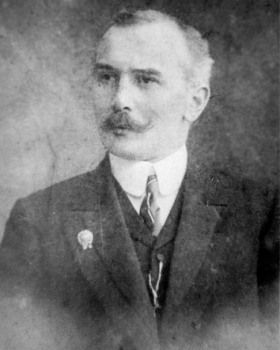
Muhiddin Penzulayev, Minister of Communications, Kumyk. Died in 1942. Brother of Tadjuddin Penzulayev.

== Legacy ==
In 1984, the United States Congress passed a resolution marking the 66th anniversary of the declaration of independence of the Mountainous Republic of the Northern Caucasus.

The "Congress of the Peoples of the North Caucasus", a political organization operating in the 21st century, has invoked the Mountainous Republic to advocate for the cooperation of different Northern Caucasus separatist groups in their struggle against Russia.

== See also ==
- Tarikh al-inqilab fi Daghistan
- Caucasian Imamate (1828–1859)
- North Caucasian Soviet Republic (1918)
- Mountain Autonomous Soviet Socialist Republic (1921–1924)
- Confederation of Mountain Peoples of the Caucasus (1989–2000)
- Prometheism

== Bibliography ==
- "Caucasian Republic Mission to the Peace Conference Appeal for Help", The Morning Post, London, Friday 4 April 1919.
- J. "Obedinennyi Kavkaz" ("Vereinigtes Kaukasien"), 1–3 (30–32), München, 1954. (in Russian)
- Baddeley, J. F., 1908, The Russian Conquest of the Caucasus, Longmans, Green, and Co., London
- Madeleine Henrey, Madeleine Grown Up, J. M. Dent & Sons, London, 1954.
- Kathleen R. Jackson, Marat Fidarov, Essays on the History of the North Caucasus, HHN Media, New York, 2009.
- Storozhenko (ed.), Ingushetia and Chechen Republic Map, Northern Caucasian Aerogeodesic Company of Roskartografia, Russia, 1995.
- Levan Z. Urushadze, "About the history of the question of unity of the Caucasian Peoples". J. "Amirani", XIII, Montreal‐Tbilisi, 2005, pp. 72–87.
- «Союз горцев Северного Кавказа и Горская республика. История несостоявшегося государства. 1917–1920», М.М. Вачагаев, 2018
- Doukaev, Aslan (December 2023). "Resurgent Dreams of Independence in the North Caucasus". Eurasia Daily Monitor. 20 (188). Jamestown Foundation.
- Bugaev, Abdula Makhmudovich; Gapurov, Shakhrudin Avdievich; Magamadov, Supyan Sultanovich (2022). "Formation of National State System of the North Caucasus Peoples (1917-1936)". doi:10.15405/epsbs.2022.12.31.
- Hille, Charlotte (2010). "State Building in the North Caucasus after the Russian Revolution". State Building and Conflict Resolution in the Caucasus. Brill. ISBN 9789004179011.
- Reynolds, Michael A. (2008). "Native Sons: Post-Imperial Politics, Islam, and Identity in the North Caucasus, 1917-1918". Jahrbücher für Geschichte Osteuropas. 56 (2): 221–247.
- Perovic, Jeronim (2018). From Conquest to Deportation: The North Caucasus Under Russian Rule. Oxford University Press. ISBN 9780190934675.
