= Hamid bey Shahtakhtinski =

Azerbaijani politician (1880–1944)

Hamid bey Shahtakhtinski Həmid bəy Şahtaxtinski
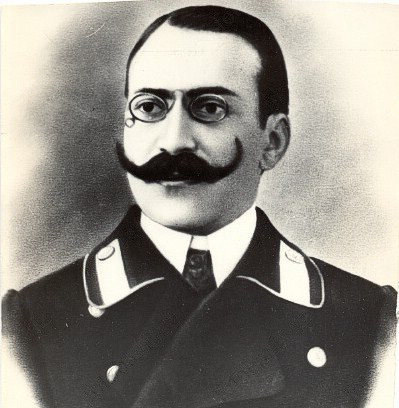

Minister of Education and Religious Affairs
- In office 22 December 1919 – 5 March 1920
- Prime Minister: Nasib Yusifbeyli
- Preceded by: Rashid Khan Gaplanov
- Succeeded by: Nurmammad bey Shahsuvarov

Personal details
- Born: March 12, 1880 Shakhtakhty, Nakhchivan, Azerbaijan
- Died: February 3, 1944 (aged 63) Arkhangelsk Oblast, Russia
- Party: Ittihad
- Relations: Shahtakhtinski family
- Education: Odesa University; Tbilisi University

Hamid bey Shakhtakhtinski Khalil oglu (Azerbaijani: Həmid bəy Şahtaxtinski Xəlil oğlu; 1880–1944) was an Azerbaijani educator who served as Minister of Education and Religious Affairs in the fifth cabinet of Azerbaijan Democratic Republic, and was member of Parliament of Azerbaijan.

== Early years ==
Shahktakhtinski was born in Shakhtakhty village of Nakhchivan, Azerbaijan on March 12, 1880. His father Khalil bey was a military person. He had two younger brothers named Akbar and Shamsaddin (also called Shamil). After completing his primary studies in a religious school in Nakhchivan, he graduated from 3rd degree Nakhchivan city school in Russian in 1895. He later studied at Erivan Pedagogical Seminary graduating in 1899. He then worked at the same institution as a teacher of Azerbaijani and Russian languages.

He was also a member of Erivan Muslim Charity Society. Shahtakhtinski then left for Odessa, Ukraine to attend Novorossiysk University, where he graduated with a law degree. While a student in Ukraine, he joined Azerbaijani Compatriots organization.

In 1912, he returned to Azerbaijan and settled in Ganja, where in 1914 he was appointed Chief Inspector of Elisabethpol Governorate schools. He then worked as Assistant Prosecutor at Elisabethpol District Court for two years. After moving to Baku in 1916, he worked in the same position at Baku District Court.

== Political career ==
After February Revolution, he became an activist of Ittihad Party and was later appointed Commissar of South Caucasus Education Department 29 August 1917. He served as Minister of Education of Transcaucasian Seim while it existed.

Shahtakhtinski was a member of the Azerbaijani National Council on the eve of declaration of independence who voted in favor of establishing an independent republic. After establishment of Azerbaijan Democratic Republic on May 28, 1918, he was elected to the National Assembly of Azerbaijan from Ittihad faction. During the work of the second, third and fourth cabinets, Shahtakhtinski served as Deputy Minister of Education and Religious Affairs. He directed qualification courses established on September 9, 1918 for local teachers in Shaki, Zaqatala and Shusha.

At the beginning of 1919, he visited Tiflis and personally conveyed the proposal of the Azerbaijani Government to transfer the Transcaucasian University to Baku. A representative commission consisting of professors Vasili Razumovsky, Nikolai Dubrovsky, Leonid Ishkov and Ivan Tsitovich, who held negotiations here, and the delegation was given to understand that the university in Baku would be opened in any case, even if the Transcaucasian University does not move there. The Azerbaijani authorities also noted the possible date for the transfer - May 1. However, since some teachers of the Transcaucasian University opposed the transfer of the university to Baku, by May 1, the Azerbaijani government did not receive a response. As a result, the Ministry of Education of the Republic of Azerbaijan sent a message to Tiflis about the opening of the Baku State University instead. Razumovsky also left Tiflis and became first rector of Baku State University. He also delivered lectures and worked as a dean in later years.

From July 1919, he officially became a member of the Ittihad Party. When the fifth government under Nasib Yusifbeyli was formed on December 22, 1919, he was appointed Minister of Education and Religious Affairs of ADR. He resigned on 5 March 1920 from these posts.

== Later years ==
After Bolshevik take over of Azerbaijan on April 28, 1920, Shahtakhtinski held vice-rectorate of Baku State University until 1925 in Baku State University and graduated from Medical faculty of Transcaucasian University in Tbilisi in 1928, taught at Azerbaijan Medical University in 1929 until 1940. He also worked at Azerbaijan University of Languages.

In 1941, he was arrested as a result of Soviet repressions, being accused of working for Iranian interests and sent to a prison camp in Arkhangelsk Oblast where he died on February 3, 1944.

== Family ==
Shahtakhtinski was married to his maternal cousin Sakina and had four daughters called Saida, Aliya, Masma and Leyla.

== See also ==
- Azerbaijani National Council
- Cabinets of Azerbaijan Democratic Republic (1918-1920)
- Current Cabinet of Azerbaijan Republic
