= Flag of the Mountainous Republic of the Northern Caucasus =

Flag

The most popular flag variant of the Mountainous Republic of the Northern Caucasus.

Official and commonly used variant of the Mountainous Republic of the Northern Caucasus.

The Mountainous Republic of the Northern Caucasus, an unrecognized state created during the Russian Civil War that existed from 1917 to 1922, used two flags as its symbols. One of them consisted of seven green and white stripes and a blue canton with seven yellow stars, in its top left corner. The other featured a green canton with a yellow or white crescent and seven stars, placed in the top left corner, on the red background.

== History ==
The Mountainous Republic of the Northern Caucasus was an unrecognized state created during the Russian Civil War. It existed from 1917 to 1922. There were two flags used by the state.

One of the flag was divided into seven horizontal stripes that altered between green and white, with the green stripe on top. In the right top corner was placed a blue canton with seven five-pointed yellow stars. Six of those were placed in two horizontal rows, each containing three stars. Next to them, on the right, was placed another star, in the middle of the height of two rows. The stars were slightly skewed to the left. The seven stars and seven stripes represented the seven regions the country claimed, (Note: The state claimed various regions, but did not actually control all of them, among them Abkhazia, which was never under its control.) which were: Abkhazia, Circassia, Chechnya, Dagestan, Ingushetia, Kabardino-Balkaria, the Nogai steppes, and Ossetia.

The second flag used by the state was red with green canton in the top left corner. Within it was a yellow or white crescent with a five-pointed star next to it, and six five-pointed stars, placed to the right. The flag was created in 1918 by artist Khalil Musayev (also known as Khalil-beg Musayasul).

The state ceased to exist on 30 November 1922. Following that, the government in exile was established in France. It used the modified version of the flag with seven white and green stripes and blue canton. Within the canton, on the left, was placed the crescent facing right, and next to each, were placed seven stars. In 1942, following the fall of France in World War II, the government in exile moved to Germany, and was reorganized as the North Caucasian National Commission, and later renamed to the National Committee of the North Caucasus in 1944. It used modified version of Musayev's flag, with a white crescent and seven white six-pointed stars, placed in the three horizontal rows, of which, the middle one had three stars, and the outer ones, two. Such flag was also used by North Caucasian and Mountain-Caucasian legions, a volunteer units in the Wehrmacht, that served in the Eastern Front.

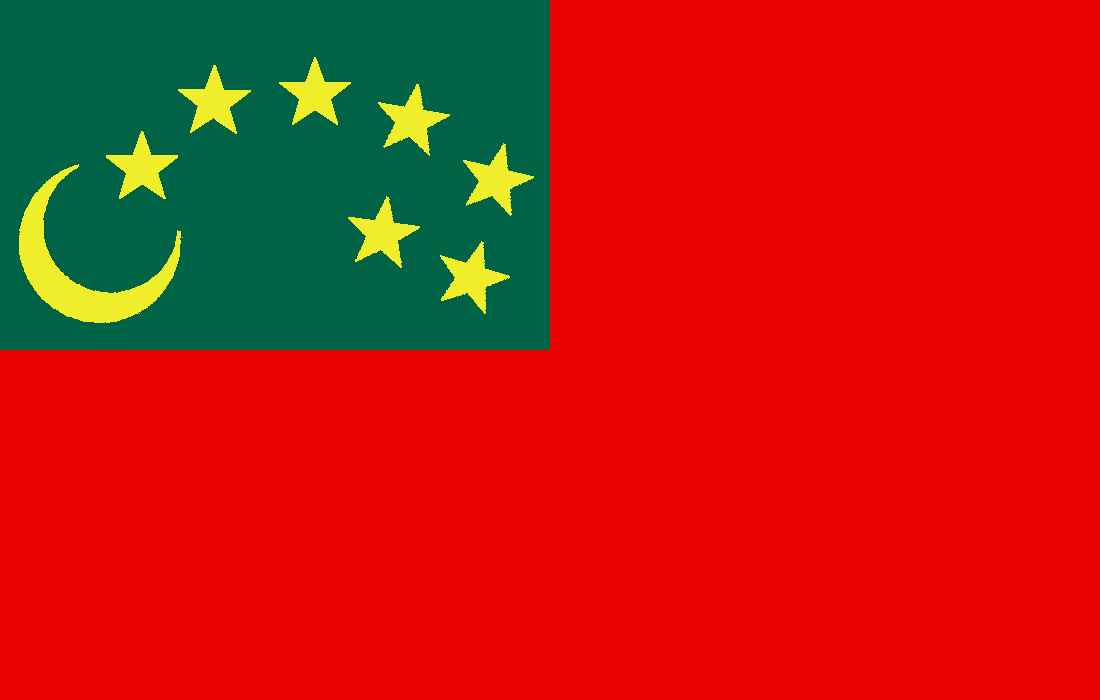
Musayev's flag, in the variant with yellow stars.

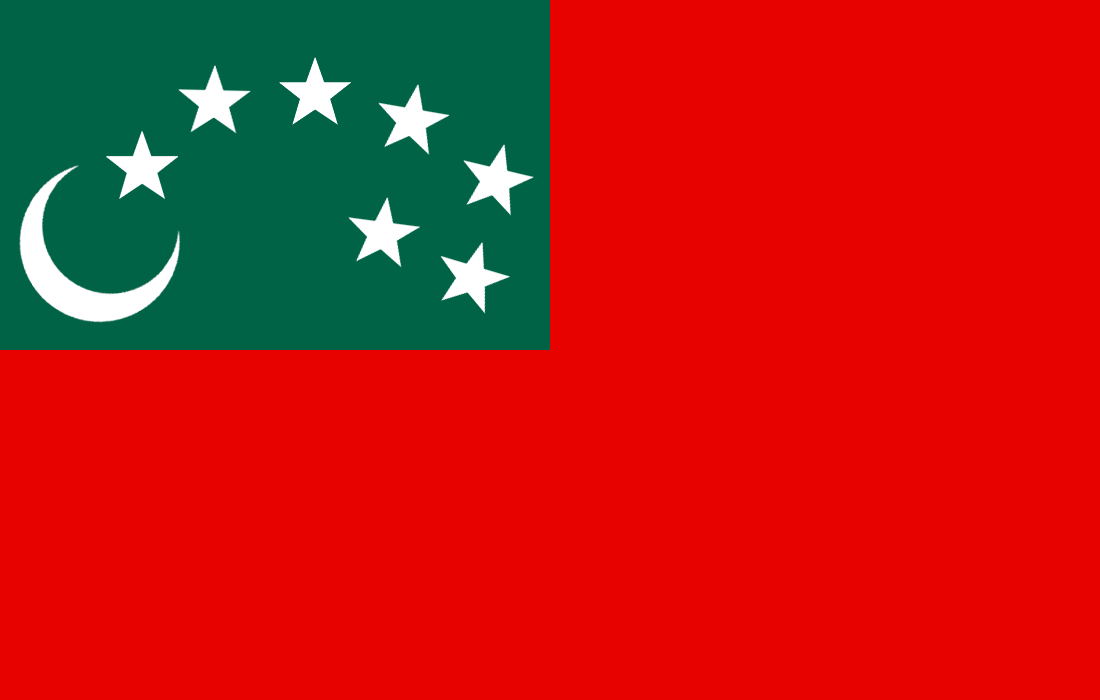
Musayev's flag, in the variant with white stars.

The flag used by the government in exile of the Mountainous Republic of the Northern Caucasus in France, used from 1922 to 1942.

The flag used by the National Committee of the North Caucasus from 1942 to 1945, and the North Caucasian and Mountain-Caucasian legions of Wehrmacht.

== Legacy ==
The flag of Abkhazia.

The flag with green and white stripes and blue canton, had inspired the flag of Abkhazia. The flag consists of seven stripes that alternate between green and white colour. In its left top corner, it has a red canton, with a white left hand, and seven white five-pointed stars above it. In 2000, Abkhazia released a stamp depicting the flag of the Mountainous Republic of the Northern Caucasus, as part of the stamps series titled Historic Flags of Abkhazia.

The flag of the Confederation of Mountain Peoples of the Caucasus, used from 1989 to 2000.

The Confederation of Mountain Peoples of the Caucasus, a militarised political organisation in the Caucasus, active from 1989 to 2000, based its flag on the flag of the Mountainous Republic of the Northern Caucasus. The organization was active around the time of before the collapse of the Soviet Union and after, between 1989 and 2000. It played a decisive role in the 1992–1993 war between Abkhazia and Georgia, rallying militants from the North Caucasian republics. Its flag was divided into seven green and white stripes. In its top left corner, it had a blue canton, featuring 17 white five-pointed stars.
