= Minkend =

Minkend / Hak Minkənd / Հակ
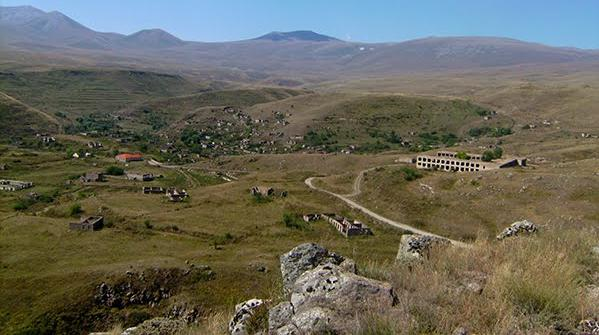

- Location within Azerbaijan Location within East Zangezur Economic Region
- Coordinates: 39°42′34″N 46°15′14″E
- Country: Azerbaijan
- District: Lachin

Population (2015)
  - Total: 86
- Time zone: UTC+4 (UTC)

Minkend (Azerbaijani: Minkənd, pronounced [minˈkænd]) or Hak (Armenian: Հակ) is a village in the Lachin District of Azerbaijan situated along a tributary of the Hakari River.

== Etymology ==
Min from the Azerbaijani language is translated as "thousand", while kend derives from old Persian, meaning "village".

According to an Armenian legend, Turco-Mongol conqueror Timur invaded Armenia and destroyed one village after another. Having devastated many villages in Zangezur, he began to count the number of destroyed settlements. After counting to a thousand, Timur said out loud "Min kend" (a thousand villages). Since then, the village has been called "Minkend".

The village was mentioned as Hak in the records of the medieval Armenian Orbelian Dynasty, It was first mentioned by Stepanos Orbelian in the 13th century, and there is an inscription on the walls of the village's St. Minas Church that reads "this newly baptized holy church was built by the people of Hak in 1675".

== History ==
Minkend was part of the Zangezur Uyezd of Elisabethpol Governorate during the Russian Empire. According to 1856 census data, Minkend was populated by Shiite Kurds who spoke Kurdish. The village had 70 homes and 600 residents in 1886, 453 of whom were Armenians and 147 of whom were Shiite Tatars (later known as Azerbaijanis). According to the 1897 Russian Empire Census, Minkend had 506 Armenian and 396 Muslim residents.

The village was badly damaged during the Armenian–Tatar massacres of 1905–1906. The first attack on the village took place in March 1905, while the second happened from June 5 to 6, during which 50 Armenians were killed. The attacks continued in August when a detachment of Cossacks was sent to protect the Armenians of Minkend, but the bailiff of Zangezur, Melik-Aslanov, convinced them that there was no danger for the Armenians. The Cossacks left Minkend to defend another village. When the Cossacks left, the Tatars killed 140 Armenians and wounded another 40 in front of the bailiff, who did not try to stop the killings. However, according to the August 1905 issue of the Syn otechestva newspaper, over 300 people were killed, and the bailiff did not even report the incident to his superiors.

According to the 1912 "Caucasian Calendar", the village of Minkend in 1911 was home to 731 people, the majority of whom were Kurds. However, in the 1915 edition of the "Caucasian Calendar", it was indicated that Minkend in 1914 was predominantly Armenian, with a population of 1,532 people.

Minkend was part of the village council of the same name in the Lachin District of the Azerbaijan SSR during the early Soviet period in 1933. The village had 280 farms and a total population of 1,355 people. The population of the village council was 58.1 percent Kurdish. The village had 2,306 residents in 1981. Its residents' main occupation was animal husbandry. There was a middle school, a club, a library, and a hospital in the village.

During the First Nagorno-Karabakh War, in May 1992, Armenian forces occupied the village, forcing the Kurdish and Azerbaijani population to flee. It was later incorporated into the breakaway Republic of Artsakh as part of its Kashatagh Province, where it was known as Hak (Armenian: Հակ). Minkend was returned to Azerbaijan on 1 December 2020 as part of the 2020 Nagorno-Karabakh ceasefire agreement.

== Historical heritage sites ==
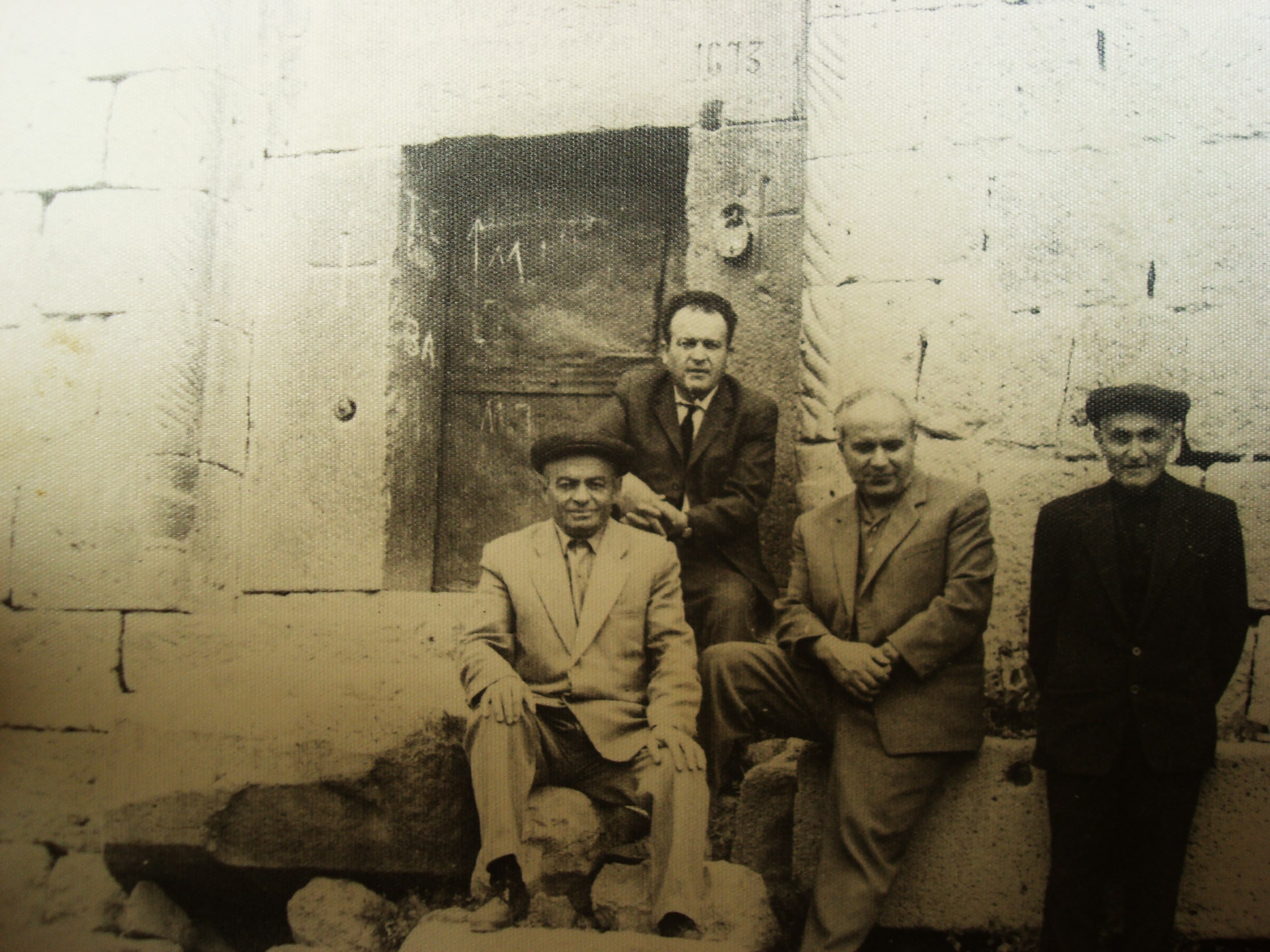
A group of scientists in front of the St. Minas Church in Minkend

Historical heritage sites in and around the village include a 13th-century khachkar, a cemetery from the 14th to the 20th centuries, St. Minas Church (Armenian: Սուրբ Մինաս եկեղեցի, romanized: Surb Minas Yekeghetsi) consecrated in 1698, two temples from the 15th century, and two arch bridges from the 19th century.

== Demographics ==
Year	Population	Ethnic composition	Source
1886	600	75.5% Armenian, 24.5% Tatar (later known as Azerbaijanis)	Transcaucasian Statistical Committee
1897	902	56.1% Armenian, 43.9% Muslim	Russian Empire Census
1911	731	Mainly Kurdish	Caucasian Calendar
1914	1,532	Mainly Armenian	Caucasian Calendar
1933	1,355	58.1% Kurdish	Statistics of Azerbaijan SSR
1981	2,306		Azerbaijani Soviet Encyclopedia
May 1992: Occupation of Minkend. Expulsion of Kurdish and Azerbaijani population
2015	86	~100% Armenians	NKR estimate

== Notable natives ==
- Nurmammad bey Shahsuvarov (1883–1958) – Azerbaijani statesman who served as Minister of Education and Religious Affairs in the fifth cabinet of Azerbaijan Democratic Republic

== Gallery ==
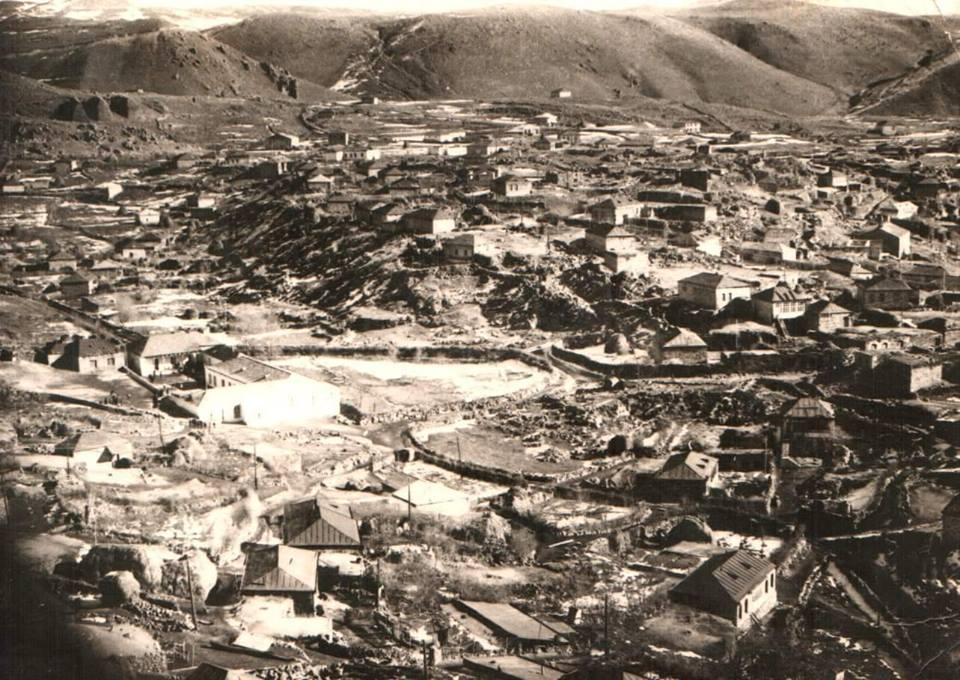
Old image of the village

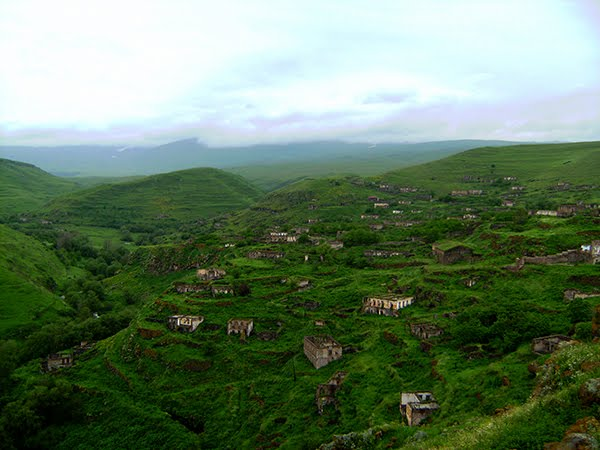
The village in 2015
