= Aliagha Hasanov =

Azerbaijani politician (1871–1933)

Aliagha Hasanov Əliağa Həsənov
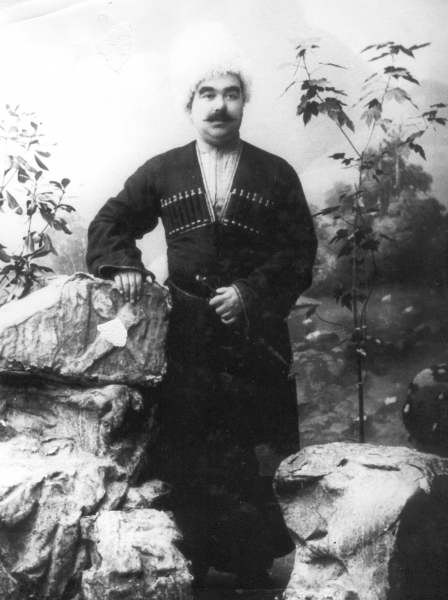

Minister of Finance of Azerbaijan Democratic Republic (ADR)
- In office 14 April 1919 – 22 December 1919
- President: Nasib Yusifbeyli Prime Minister, (Chairman of Azerbaijani Parliament)
- Preceded by: Ivan Protasov
- Succeeded by: Rashid Khan Gaplanov

Personal details
- Born: 1871 Baku, Azerbaijan
- Died: 1933 (aged 61–62) Baku, Azerbaijan

Aliagha Hasanov (Azerbaijani: Əliağa Həsənov; 1871–1933), also spelled as Ali Aga Hasanov, was an Azerbaijani statesman who served as Minister of Finance in the fourth cabinet of Azerbaijan Democratic Republic, and was member of Parliament of Azerbaijan.

== Early years ==
Hasanov was born in 1871 in Baku, Azerbaijan. He graduated from Baku City Commerce School. He was one of the co-founders of Nəşri-Maarif Society of Azerbaijan. Hasanov was then elected to the City Duma (Council) of Baku. As a wealthy businessman, he played an important role in construction of Şollar Water Channel, city sewage network and Baku Boulevard.

== Political career ==
After establishment of Azerbaijan Democratic Republic on 28 May 1918, Hasanov was elected to the National Assembly of Azerbaijan as an independent deputy. During the third government in office, from 26 December 1918 to 14 March 1919, he served as Deputy Minister of Finance. When the fourth government under Nasib Yusifbeyli was formed on 14 April 1919, Hasanov was appointed Minister of Finance. Under his leadership, the State Bank of Azerbaijan was established in 1919. He was replaced as minister by Rashid Khan Gaplanov on 22 December 1919.

After Bolshevik take over of Azerbaijan, Hasanov worked as the director of the Central Bank. He died from typhus in 1933.

== See also ==
- Azerbaijani National Council
- Cabinets of Azerbaijan Democratic Republic (1918-1920)
- Current Cabinet of Azerbaijan Republic
- Ali Hasanov (disambiguation)
