= Fifth cabinet of the Azerbaijan Democratic Republic =

The fifth cabinet of the Azerbaijan Democratic Republic governed the Azerbaijan Democratic Republic (ADR) between December 22, 1919, and April 1, 1920. It was formed after the fourth cabinet of the Azerbaijan Democratic Republic dissolved on December 22, 1919, and was led by Prime Minister of Azerbaijan Nasib Yusifbeyli with the following composition:

State Agency	Minister	Period	Party
Prime Minister	Nasib Yusifbeyli	April 14, 1919 and April 1, 1920	Musavat
Minister of Foreign Affairs	Fatali Khan Khoyski	December 22, 1919 - April 1, 1920	Independent
Minister of Education and Religious Affairs	Hamid bey Shahtakhtinski; Nurmammad bey Shahsuvarov	December 22, 1919 - March 5, 1920; March 5, 1920 - April 1, 1920	Ittihad
Minister of Internal Affairs	Mammad Hasan Hajinski; Mustafa Vekilov	December 22, 1919 - February 15, 1920; February 15, 1920 - April 28, 1920	Musavat
Minister of Defense	Samad bey Mehmandarov	December 26, 1918 – April 28, 1920	Independent
Minister of Healthcare	Musa bey Rafiyev	December 22, 1919 - April 1, 1920	Musavat
Minister of Transportation	Khudadat bey Malik-Aslanov	May 28, 1918 – April 28, 1920	Independent
Minister of Industry and Trade (acting)	Khudadat bey Malik-Aslanov; Mammad Hasan Hajinski	December 22, 1919 - February 18, 1920; February 18, 1920 - April 1, 1920	Independent; Musavat
Minister of Postal Service and Telegraph	Jamo bey Hajinski	April 14, 1919 - April 1, 1920	Muslim Socialist Bloc
Minister of Finance	Rashid Khan Gaplanov	December 22, 1919 - April 1, 1920	Ahrar
Ministry of Justice and Labor	Khalil Khasmammadov	December 22, 1919 - April 1, 1920	Musavat
State Controller	Heybat Gulu Mammadbayov	December 22, 1919 - April 1, 1920	Ittihad
Minister of Social Security	Musa bey Rafiyev	December 22, 1919 - April 1, 1920	Musavat
Minister of Agriculture	Ahmad bey Pepinov	December 22, 1919 - April 1, 1920	Muslim Socialist Bloc
Head of State Security	Naghi Sheykhzamanli	August, 1919 – March, 1920	Musavat

The sixth cabinet of the Azerbaijan Democratic Republic was in the process of being formed by Mammad Hasan Hajinski when the Red Army occupied Azerbaijan and power was passed to the Bolsheviks.

== See also ==
- Cabinets of the Azerbaijan Democratic Republic (1918–1920)
- Cabinet of Azerbaijan
