= Şahtaxtı =

- Municipality
- Location within Azerbaijan
- Coordinates: 39°22′19″N 45°05′46″E
- Country: Azerbaijan
- Autonomous republic: Nakhchivan
- District: Kangarli

Population (2005)
  - Total: 3,100
- Time zone: UTC+4 (AZT)

Şahtaxtı is a village and municipality in the Kangarli District of Nakhchivan, Azerbaijan. The village is located in the Sharur plain, 4.5 km south-west from the regional center. Its population engages in farming and animal husbandry.

There are a secondary school, kindergarten, cultural house and a medical center in the village. It has a population of 3,100. The medieval monuments of Cinlidere are located in the south-west of the village; in the west, near the Givrag plateau, is the location of Shahbaghy. South of the village lies the city of Poldasht in Iran.

== Etymology ==
The name "Şahtaxtı" is the turkified name of the Persian "Shahtakht", which literally means "King's throne" (Persian: "Shah" شاه + "Takht" تخت), which itself is a Persian translation of the Armenian name "Tagavoranist" (Armenian: "Tagavor" Թագավոր + ա + "Nist" նիստ). The original name of the settlement was "Arkashat" (Արքաշատ), meaning "The joy of the King", and was mentioned by Strabo as "Arxata" (Ἄρξατα).

== Ancient settlement ==
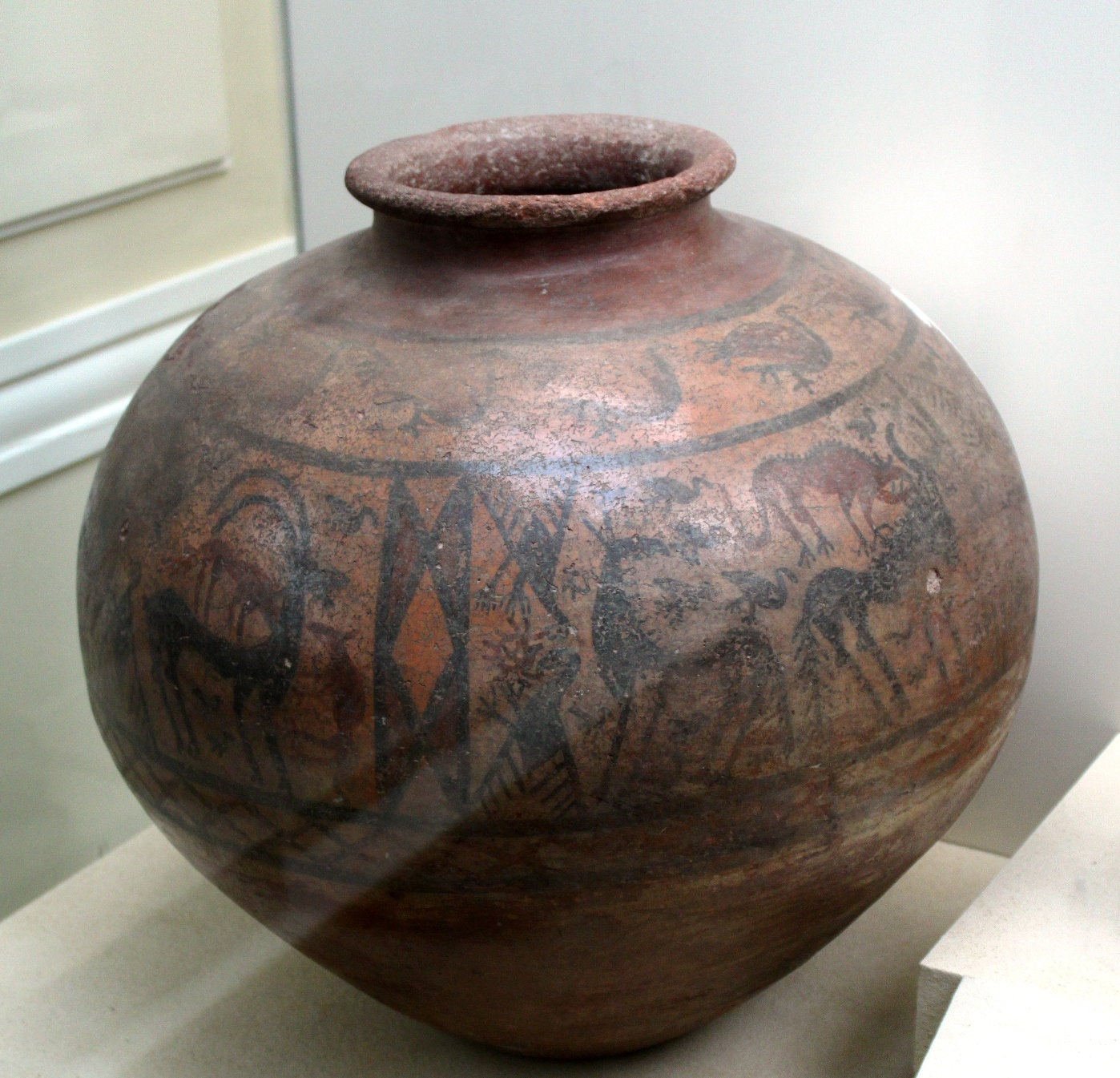
Clay vessel from the village. Karmirberd culture, mid-II millennium BC

Nearby is the site of an ancient settlement of the Bronze and first Iron Age; it is located south-west from the village. According to findings, the earliest settlement in the area was founded in the third millennium BC.

Documents of the U.S. Department of State suggest a historically heavy Armenian presence in the area; the ancient city of Arshat-Arkashat (Armenian: Արշատ-Արքաշատ, romanized: Aršat-Ark’ašat) had been founded in the third century BC and served as a residence of Armenian kings. Tombs and cuneiform of the Van kingdom, dated to the third to second centuries BC had been also discovered on its territory.

The area is about 2 hectares. As a result of wear and tear, the remains of the monuments and the destroyed stone buildings need to be monitored. The thickness of the cultural layer, which was defined as the result of researches (1936 and 1979–90), is 3–4.5 m. The castle walls, built of large stones (2.2–2.6 m in width, 1,2-2,5 m in height) and remains of the residential buildings are very interesting.

During the 15-14th centuries BC, Şahtaxtı became a type of fortress-city settlement, and has been the center of large tribal unions of Nakhchivan. The pottery, metalwork, jewellery etc. were highly developed in Şahtaxtı. A rich painted ceramics, cylindrical seals (15-14 centuries BC), and the exquisite decorative patterns found here show that the Şahtaxtı was in close contact with the ancient cultural centers of the Middle East. Pink, gray and black pottery, ornaments, stone tools and osteologic remains were found in the settlement.

== Demographics ==
According to the 1897 census, Şahtaxtı—mentioned as Shakhtakhty (Russian: Шахтахты)—had a population of 1,457 consisting of 1,427 Muslims. The village had 731 men and 726 women.

== Notable natives ==
- Hamid bey Shahtakhtinski – Minister of Education and Religious Affairs of Azerbaijan Democratic Republic.
- Behbud Agha Shakhtakhtinski – People's Commissar of Justice of Azerbaijan SSR, Chairman of the Council of People's Commissars of the Nakhichevan SSR (1922).
- Huseyin Ibrahimov – writer, People's Writer of Azerbaijan (1998), Chairman of the Supreme Council of Nakhichevan ASSR (1963–71), Minister of Culture of the Nakhichevan ASSR (1970–76).
- Zarifa Aliyeva – ophthalmologist, academician of the Azerbaijan National Academy of Sciences, professor; daughter of the People's Commissar of Health of Azerbaijan SSR, First Secretary of the Dagestan Regional Committee of the Communist Party, Aziz Aliyev, wife of the President of Azerbaijan Heydar Aliyev and the mother of the President of Azerbaijan Ilham Aliyev.
