= Abdulmajid Tapa Tchermoev =

First prime minister of the Mountainous Republic of the Northern Caucasus

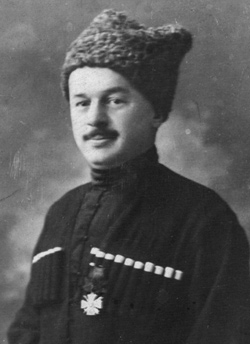

Prime Minister of the Mountainous Republic of the Northern Caucasus
- In office 11 May 1918 – December 1918
- Preceded by: Office Established
- Succeeded by: Pshemakho Kotsev

Personal details
- Born: 1882 Grozny, Terek oblast, Russian Empire
- Died: August 28, 1937 Lausanne, Switzerland
- Spouse(s): 1st wife - Princess Khavarsultan Khanum Ibrahimbeyova of Persia; 2nd wife - Natasha Brailovsky né Kanelsky
- Children: 1

Abdulmajid Tapa Tchermoev (Note: Russian: Тапа́ (Абду́л Меджи́д) Арцу́евич Чермо́ев, romanized: Tapá (Abdúl Medzhíd) Artsúevich Chermóyev; Chechen: Тапа Абдул Миджит Бей Орцу Чермо́ев, romanized: Tapa Abdul Mijit Bey Ortsu Chermóev) (1882 – August 28, 1937) was a North Caucasian statesman of Chechen origin, general, oil magnate and the first prime minister of the Mountainous Republic of the Northern Caucasus. He was in office from 11 May 1918 until December 1918. His official title was General Tchermoeff, Prime Minister of the Mountainous Republic of the Northern Caucasus.

== Early life ==
Tchermoev was born in Grozny, then part of the Caucasus Viceroyalty within the Russian Empire (now in modern day Chechnya within the Russian Federation) in 1882. Tapa was the eldest son of General Ortsu Tchermoev and belonged to the Biltoy teip. He was educated at the Vladikavkaz real school and at the Nicholas Cavalry College in St. Petersburg. He graduated in 1901 and joined an elite military unit, His Majesty's Own Cossack Escort of Tsar Nicholas II.

Tapa Tchermoev married Princess Khavarsultan Khanim Ibrahimbeyova of Persia in 1906. Although still a young man, he was obliged to leave the army in 1908 when his father died. During this time, he threw himself into economic and industrial activities. His family owned important parcels of oil-bearing land in the Grozny area. Tapa automatically became one of the most active and energetic pioneers of the Grozny oil industry.

World War I interrupted Tapa's economic activity. He joined the famous native Savage Division of the Imperial Russian Army with the rank of captain. In the war he proved himself a brilliant military leader and a fearless soldier. After the October Revolution, Tapa returned to his native land with an intention to stem Russian imperialism and particularly the Bolsheviks.

== The Mountainous Republic of the Northern Caucasus ==
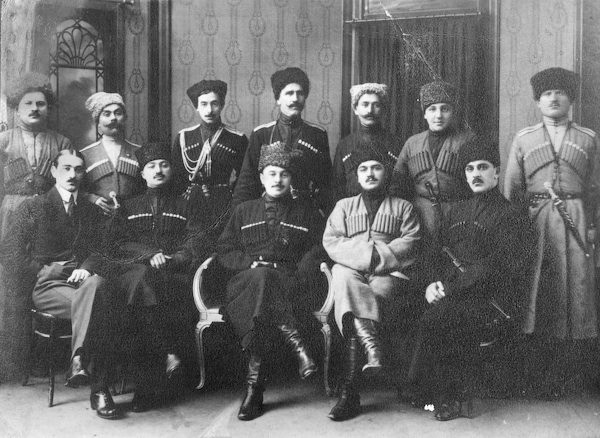
Leaders of the MRNC with Tapa Tchermoeff front row centre.

Tapa believed the unifying of all Caucasian highlanders to be the only way of saving the Northern Caucasus from the Russian rule and then the Bolsheviks. On his initiative and thanks to his unrelenting energy, a convention of Caucasian highlanders took place in March 1917. This meeting resolved to form an independent highland state. On 11 May 1918 the Mountainous Republic of the Northern Caucasus was officially established. Tapa was first the prime minister and then the minister for foreign affairs.

Early in March 1919, Tapa headed a delegation to Paris in an attempt to take part in the Treaty of Versailles. The object of the delegation was to secure the recognition of the independence of the Mountainous Republic of the Northern Caucasus. A year later, the North Caucasus was in the hands of the Bolsheviks and in January 1921 the Soviet Mountain Republic of the Russian SFSR was established.

From his second marriage he had a daughter, Marianne Bicat (March 27, 1921 - 1985).
