= Mammadbaghir Sheykhzamanli =

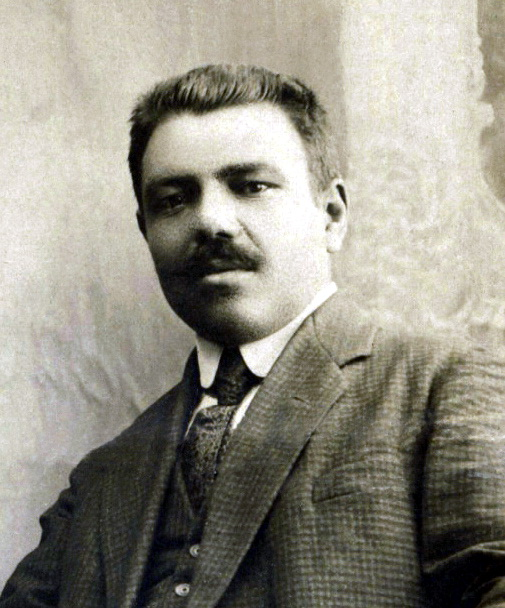

1st Head of Organization for Combating Counterrevolution Azerbaijan Democratic Republic
- In office June 1919 – August 1919

Personal details
- Born: 1880 Elisabethpol Governorate(Ganja), Russian Empire
- Died: 1920 (aged 39–40) Baku, Azerbaijan Soviet Socialist Republic
- Party: Müsavat

Mammadbaghir Saleh oglu Sheykhzamanli (Azerbaijani: Məmmədbağır Saleh oğlu Şeyxzamanlı; 1880–1920) was a first head of the organization for Combating Counterrevolution - Azerbaijani special services.

== Biography ==
Mammadbaghir Sheykhzamanli was born in 1880 in the Elisabethpol, the present-day Ganja, Azerbaijan. In June 1919 he was appointed the head of Organization for Combating Counterrevolution established by the national government of Azerbaijan Democratic Republic. After working for a while, Sheikhzamanli was dismissed from his post in August 1919, in connection with his political activities as a member of the Musavat Party in the first cabinet of Azerbaijan Democratic Republic.

As a Member of Parliament, Sheykhzamanli participated in the discussion of some important public issues, including the draft laws and resolutions. Because of his consistent struggle to achieve the independence of Azerbaijan and irreconcilable political position, Mammadbaghir Sheykhzamanli was arrested by the Bolsheviks after the Russian occupation of Azerbaijan and shot in May 1920.

== Personal life ==
His daughter Rukia Sheykhzamanli was married to Kamil Rafibeyli (Aran), the son of Khudadat Rafibeyli.

== See also ==
- Naghi Sheykhzamanli
