= Naghi Sheykhzamanli =

Azerbaijani politician

Naghi Sheykhzamanli Nağı Saleh oğlu Şeyxzamanlı Naki Keykurun
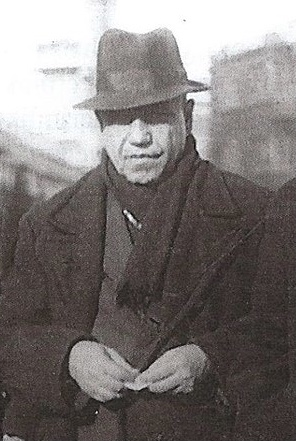

Counterintelligence service of ADR
- In office August 1919 – March 6, 1920
- President: Fatali Khan Khoyski (Chairman of Azerbaijani Parliament)
- Preceded by: Mammad Baghir Sheykhzamanli
- Succeeded by: office abolished

Personal details
- Born: 1883 Elisabethpol, Russian Empire
- Died: 1967 (aged 83–84) Istanbul, Turkey
- Party: Musavat

Naghi Saleh oglu Sheykhzamanli (Azerbaijani: Nağı Saleh oğlu Şeyxzamanlı; 1883 in Ganja – 1967 in Istanbul, Turkey), also known as Naki Keykurun, was an Azerbaijani political figure and the head of the counterintelligence service of Azerbaijan Democratic Republic within the fourth and fifth cabinets led by Nasib Yusifbeyli.

== Early years ==
Naghi Sheykhzamanli was born in 1883 in the Elisabethpol, the present-day Ganja, Azerbaijan.

== Career ==
In 1905, Sheykhzamanli joined "Difai" (Defender) National Committee established by the Ahmed bey Aghayev in Ganja, which in 1917 merged with the National Party of Turkic Federalists established by Nasib Yusifbeyli into Musavat.

Upon the establishment of Azerbaijan Democratic Republic, Sheykhzamanli became an instrumental figure behind the invitation of the Ottoman forces to support the ADR government in its struggle against the Bolshevik Baku Commune. During the negotiations with the Ottoman triumvir, Enver Pasha, Sheykhzamanli successfully pushed for Enver's brother, Nuru Pasha, to take the lead over the Ottoman offensive in the Caucasus.

== Exile ==
Upon the Bolshevik occupation of Azerbaijan in April 1920, Sheykhzamanli fled to Turkey.

During World War II, Sheikhzamanly, as well as other Azerbaijani exiles such as Khalil Bey Khasmmamadov, Shafi-bek Rustambekov, Fuad Emirjan considered for Azerbaijani participation in the war on the German side as the last opportunity to restore the independence of the First Republic of Azerbaijan

Later in life, he moved and settled with family to New Jersey, United States, where they established Azerbaijan Society of America in 1957. Under the pen-name of Naki Keykurun, he also published a few essays in Turkish about the first Azerbaijani independence movement in Istanbul, including "The Great Philanthropist Haji Zeynalabdin Taghiyev" (1957), "The Confession" (1963), and "The Memoirs of the National Liberation Movement in Azerbaijan" (1964). The latter two books were republished by the Ministry of National Security of Azerbaijan in 2004.

Naghi Sheykhzamanli died in Istanbul in 1967.
