= Ali Hasanov =

Azerbaijani musician (born 1976)

- Born: Ali Ali oglu Hasanov; 1 January 1976 (age 49); Baku, Azerbaijan, USSR

Ali Ali oglu Hasanov (Azerbaijani: Əli Əli oğlu Həsənov; Russian: Али Гасанов; born 1 January 1976, Baku) is an Azerbaijani artist, musician, and filmmaker.

Hasanov was born in 1976 in Baku, Azerbaijan. He graduated from the Azerbaijani State University of Culture and the Arts and received an MFA in Filmmaking from Rustam Ibragimbekov's Baku International Film School.

He represented Azerbaijan at the 52nd Venice Biennale and at the 4th Moscow Biennale of Contemporary Art. He is also the founder and leader of a musical collective called "PG Large Used Project." Hasanov's genres include visual and performance art, video and sound installations. He lives and works in Baku.

== Projects and exhibitions ==
- 2011 – Video Installation "Takeaway/Prisoner" at "Beliye Nochi", Museum of Contemporary Art PERMM, Perm, Russia.
- 2010 – Short Film "Sonnet XXX" at "Azerbaijani Cinematographers Union", Baku, Azerbaijan.
- 2010 – Short Film "Stems from the Drift" at "Azerbaijani Cinematographers Union", Baku, Azerbaijan.
- 2009 – Video Installations "Think of the Radio", "Appointment" at DEPO, Istanbul, Turkey.
- 2009 – Personal Exhibition "Cathedral Spy" at Protvor Gallery, St.Petersburg, Russia.
- 2009 – Mars Gallery (Marsovo pole project), performance-installation "Sentencia", Moscow, Russia
- 2007 – International Art-forum "Art Caucasus". Tbilisi, Georgia; "Air Mail" – video.
- 2007 – 52nd Venice Biennale "OMNIA MEA", Italy.
- 2006 – Art residence (Rogaland Art Centre, Art Centre Tou Scene). "Keelcoushe" performance – installation, Stavanger, Norway
- 2006 – "Art Caucasus" – National centre or contemporary art, Moscow, Russia.
- 2006 – International art festival "East-o-West" «Keelcoushe" performance-installation, Die, France
- 2005 – "Memory Unit" – performance – installation. Museum Centre, Baku, Azerbaijan
- 2005 – "Blood with Milk" performance. French Cultural Centre, Baku, Azerbaijan
- 2002 – Music art festival "Gender + Theatre" «PG large used project". Musical project "Fridarumental 8000-th probe", Baku, Azerbaijan
- 1999 – Art Manege "Sex 2000", Moscow, Russia
- 1999 – Performance action "Air paws". Baku Art Centre, Baku, Azerbaijan
- 1998 – Performance/social intervention "The brain of galapagos turtle", Baku, Azerbaijan.
