= Pshemakho Kotsev =

Circassian writer, activist, and politician (1884–1962)

- Куэцэ Пщымахуэ; Пшемахо Коцев
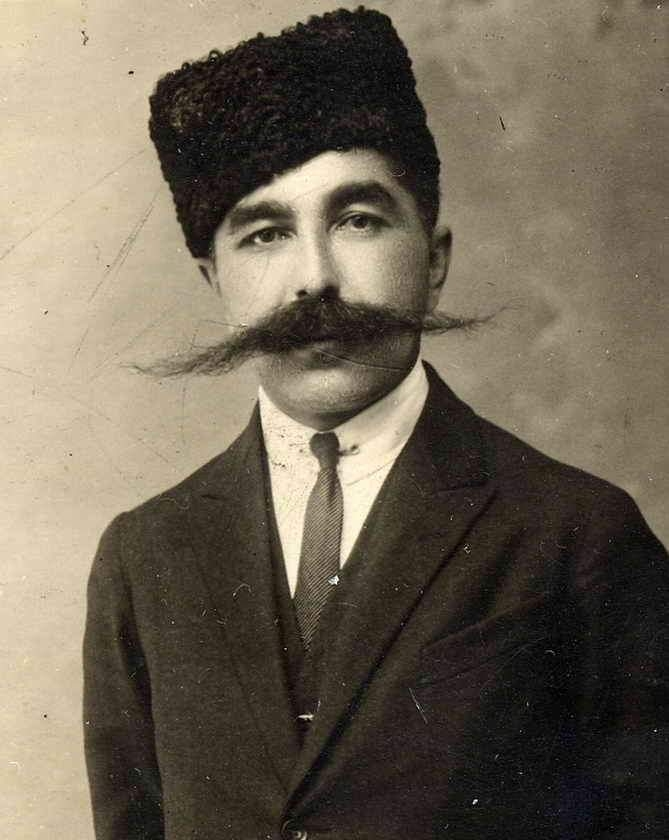

Prime Minister of the Mountainous Republic of the Northern Caucasus
- In office December 1918 – 12 May 1919
- Preceded by: Tapa Tchermoeff
- Succeeded by: General Halilov

Personal details
- Born: Kuətsə T'əmaṩ yi qwə Pşımaxwə; 12 April 1884 Babukovo, Terek Oblast, Russian Empire (now Sarmakovo, Kabardino-Balkaria, Russian Federation)
- Died: 8 January 1962 (aged 77) Istanbul, Turkey
- Children: Zaira Kotsev
- Parent: Tamasha Husseinovich Kotsev (father)
- Education: Saint Petersburg University

Pshemakho Tamashevich Kotsev (Note: Kabardian: Куэцэ Тӏэмаш и къуэ Пщымахуэ, romanized: Kuətsə T'əmaṩ yi qwə Pşımaxwə; Russian: Пшемахо Тамашевич Коцев; Turkish: Pşımaho Kotse) (12 April 1884 – 8 January 1962), was a Circassian politician, writer, activist and second prime minister of the Mountainous Republic of the Northern Caucasus, being one of the most prominent political figures in the North Caucasus in 1917–1920.

== Biography ==
He was born on 12 April 1884, in the village of Babukovo (now Sarmakovo) of the Nalchik District of the Terek Region of the Russian Empire, in the family of a Kabardian nobleman Kotsev Tamasha Khusinovich. He received his primary education in the city of Pyatigorsk. In 1905 he continued his studies at the Novorossiysk gymnasium, which he successfully graduated from.

In 1910 he graduated from the law faculty of Saint Petersburg University with the presentation of a first degree diploma with all the rights provided for by the general charter of the imperial Russian universities. On 22 November 1910, he began to work as a judicial officer in the city of Yekaterinodar (now Krasnodar), where he held a field in various ranks, from a junior candidate to attorney at law of the Novocherkassk district of the city of Yekaterinodar, and more.

He was an active participant in social and political events in the North Caucasus and one of the organizers of the national liberation movement of the mountain peoples. At the end of 1920 he was exiled to Turkey, where he later wrote historical works: "Revolution and Sovietization in the North Caucasus", "North Caucasus: pages from the history of the struggle for freedom and independence".

After Dagestan was taken from Soviet Russia with the support of the North Caucasus Army under the command of Yusuf Izzet Pasha, who was appointed by the Ottoman to help the Mountainous Republic's independence war, he went from Tbilisi to Dagestan and joined the work of the national government. Upon the resignation of the President of the North Caucasus Republic, Abdulmajid Tapa Tchermoeff, he was elected by the Republic Union Parliament as the new leader. It lasted until 12 May 1919, when he resigned during a very heavy period when both the Reds and the Whites attacked. After the occupation of the country by the Red Army, in May 1920 he had to flee to Georgia like many intellectuals. On 13 October 1920, at the request of the Soviet government, he was arrested by the Georgian government.

He was released with the effort of his North Caucasian nationalist comrades such as Haidar Bammate and Alikhan Kantemir in Tbilisi. After living in Trabzon and Samsun for a while, he went to France in late 1921 and lived there for a while. After 1923 he returned to Turkey and settled in Istanbul. His articles on the Caucasus were published in magazines such as Mücahit in Ankara and Caucasian Review in Munich. He was one of the founders of the North Caucasus-Turkish Culture and Solidarity Association (Today's United Caucasus Association), which was one of the first Caucasian organizations formed in Istanbul after a long break in the Republican era. A booklet called "Pages from the History of the North Caucasus Freedom and War of Independence" was published by this association.

In 1923, in Istanbul, Ahmedkhan Avarsky, a former White Guard officer, and Kotsev established the Anatoly trading company. The firm tried to provide material and technical assistance to the rebels (led by Najmuddin of Gotzo) in the North Caucasus. The Soviet government believed that there Kotsev collaborated with various anti-Bolshevik émigré committees. After the Bolsheviks liquidated Najmuddin's uprising in September 1925, Kotsev ceased any participation in the armed struggle against Soviet power.

He died in Istanbul on 8 January 1962. After the funeral salah in Şişli Mosque, he was buried in Feriköy Cemetery alongside other Caucasian peoples, with an official and military ceremony held for being a former president.
