= Tarikh al-inqilab fi Daghistan =

Tarikh al-inqilab fi Daghistan ("History of the Revolution in Daghestan") is an Arabic-language historical manuscript and eyewitness account about the 1917 Revolution in Dagestan authored by the Dagestani Islamic scholar Ali Kaiaev (1878–1943). Kaiaev's family hid it from the Soviet authorities until Shamil Shikhaliev and Naira Sahakyan recently discovered it in Kaiaev's private archive, which is now kept by his grandson, Ilyas Kaiaev. The manuscript is an important addition to the surviving primary sources on the 1917 Revolution in Dagestan that followed the February Revolution.

== Sources ==
- Shikhaliev, Shamil; Sahakyan, Naira (2025). "Reinterpreting the 1917 Revolution in Daghestan: Conflicting Narratives and the Vernacular Perspective of Ali Kaiaev". Caucasus Survey. 13 (3): 197–219. doi:10.30965/23761202-bja10050.
