= Church of Saint Nicholas the Wonderworker, Sabirabad =

Church of Saint Nicholas the Wonderworker
- Церковь Святителя Николая Чудотворца; Müqəddəs Möcüzəyaradan Nikolay kilsəsi
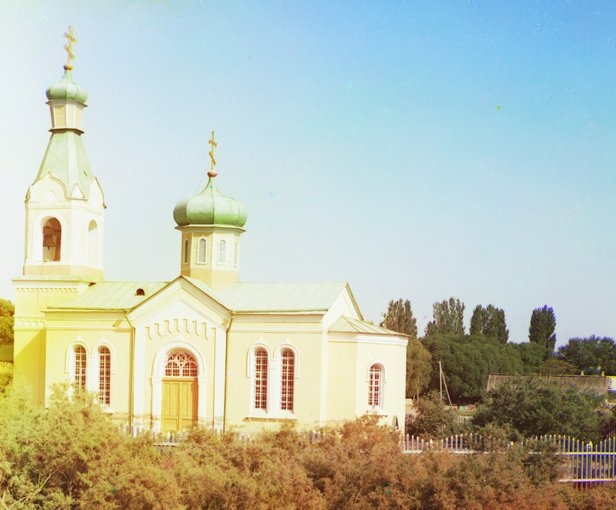
- Church of St. Nicholas the Wonderworker. 1912 year. The photo belongs to Sergey Prokudin-Gorsky.
- Church of Saint Nicholas the Wonderworker
- Location: Petropavlovka, Javad uezd, Baku Governorate, Russian Empire
- Country: Azerbaijan
- Denomination: Russian Orthodox

History
- Dedication: Saint Nicholas
- Consecrated: 9 May 1888

Architecture
- Functional status: Demolished
- Architect: Chizhov
- Architectural type: Temple, church
- Years built: February 26, 1871-1875
- Completed: 1875

Specifications
- Length: 21 m (68 ft 11 in)
- Width: 8.5 m (27 ft 11 in)
- Height: 5 m (16 ft 5 in)

The Church of Saint Nicholas the Wonderworker (Церковь Святителя Николая Чудотворца, Müqəddəs Möcüzəyaradan Nikolay kilsəsi) is a Russian Orthodox Church located in the former settlement of Petropavlovka (now the city of Sabirabad), created in the historical region of Qalaqayın.

== Historical context ==
In the 1880s, the first Russian settlers began to appear in the Mughan plain. At first, they leased state-owned land for farming, and when the number of settlers began to increase, they applied to the government for permission to use these lands. Thus, the first Russian villages and settlements gradually began to appear on Mughan. The government not only provided material support to the settlers, but also met their spiritual needs. There was a need to build Orthodox churches. One of the first Russian villages in Mughan was Petropavlovka village of Javad uezd, located at the confluence of Kura and Aras. Previously, this place was occupied by the city of Javad, which was the center of the Javad Khanate, founded in 1747. In 1768, it became dependent on the Guba Khanate. In 1778, the city was captured and looted by Gilan Khan Hidayatullah Khan, who opposed Guba Khan Fatali Khan. Some of the captured residents were taken to Rasht and Anzali to perform agricultural work. Javad was destroyed and never regained its former position and importance. In 1805, the territory of the Javad Khanate was joined to the Russian Empire. In 1868, attempts were made to restore the city. In the same year, the emergency government began to operate here, space was allocated for the construction of administrative buildings, and work began.

== Construction ==
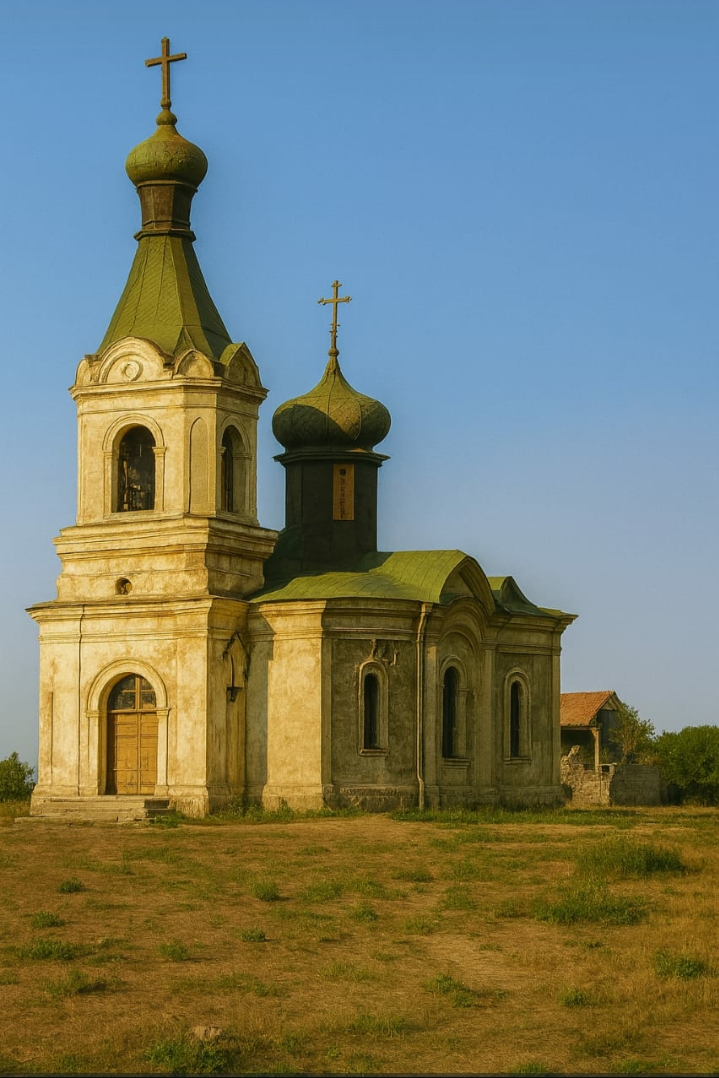
Church of St. Nicholas the Wonderworker. Petropavlovka (now Sabirabad). 1895. Photographer Arthur Ivanovich Vilborg (1850-?).

In order to quickly revive Javad and attract the Orthodox, it was decided to build an Orthodox church in Javad, and the military governor of Baku, Lieutenant General N. N. Kolyubakin, on December 4, 1870, asked the Georgian Exarch, Archbishop Eusebius, for permission to build a temple. After receiving the consent of the Exarch, as well as the governor of the Caucasus, Grand Duke Mikhail Nikolayevich, the construction began. On February 26, 1871, the foundation stone of the temple was laid in honor of the holy apostles Peter and Paul. According to the calculations of the architect Chizhov, 11,587 rubles were allocated from the treasury for the construction of the church. The author of the church project was state engineer A. I. Bardin, and the construction was carried out under his supervision. The church was built in the shape of a ship with a Russian-Byzantine bell tower on a stone foundation 9 cubits 2 cubits long (about 21 m) and four cubits (8.5 m) wide. The walls of the temple are made of baked bricks with a height of two fathoms and three quarters of an arshi (about 5 m). The church had 4 doors and 10 windows. The building is covered with an iron roof, the octagonal dome is made of wood, the lamp and head are also made of wood and covered with tin. The bell tower directly adjacent to the church was 9 cubits (about 19 m) high and covered with a wooden dome covered with an iron roof. The crosses were wooden, replaced by openwork irons in 1904. By 1905, the bell tower had 5 bells, the largest of which weighed 30 pounds and 2 pounds (about 490 kg).

== Arrival of Christians and consecration ==
The church, built in 1875, remained unconsecrated for a long time. The government of uezd was moved to Salyan for many administrative reasons, and there were still no Orthodox Christians in Javad. Only in 1887, the first settlers appeared in Javad, several families began to request the consecration of the temple. By that time, the building already required some repairs, and the temple still lacked an iconostasis. The Baku Governorate allocated 671 rubles 64 kopecks for the needs of the Javad church. With this money, a one-tier wooden iconostasis with signs from the Moscow painting was purchased, a linden altar was installed, three bells and the necessary items for the consecration of the church were purchased. On May 9, 1888, the dean of Baku governorate, Archpriest Alexander Yunitsky consecrated the temple in honor of Nicholas the Wonderworker. The displaced wanted to give a new name to the temple themselves. Due to the small size of the church, a permanent priest was not assigned to the newly consecrated church.

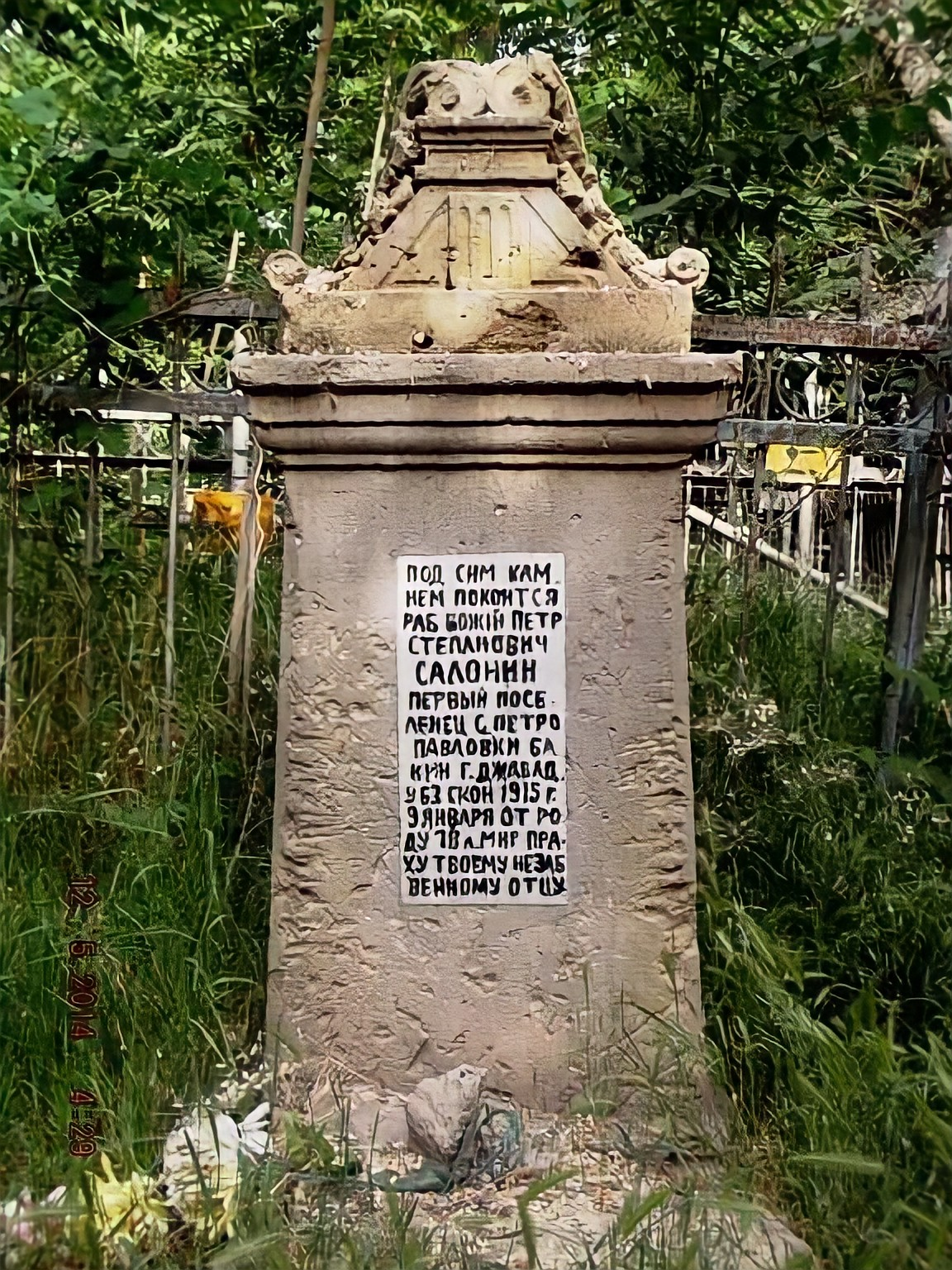
In Russian: On January 9, 1915, Pyotr Stepanovich Solonin, the first inhabitant of the village of Petropavlovka (now Sabirabad city), Javad uyezd of Baku province, was buried under this stone at the age of 78.

== Active church ==
In 1887, by the order of A.M. Dondukov-Korsakov, the commander-in-chief of the civilian unit in the Caucasus, the city of Javad was abolished. A group of new settlers was allowed to settle in its place. Since 1892, instead of Javad as the center, the Russian village that arose in the territory of Qalaqayın was called Petropavlovka (right bank of the junction). The number of visitors to the Church of St. Nicholas the Wonderworker increased and the need to organize an independent church arose. In 1892, priest Iohan Meiparianov became the first priest of the church. A psalmist was also appointed. The salary received from the treasury was 450 rubles per year for the priest, and 150 rubles for the psalmist. Reverend Iohan Meiparianov served in Petropavlovka for almost a year and died of typhus on January 22, 1893, and was buried in the church fence. In the same year, priest Abraham Abazadze was appointed to the church, which built a small three-room reed building in the temple, and a parochial school was established in one of the rooms. His successor, priest Dmitri Kirichenko, appointed to Petropavlovka in 1901, appealed to the governor of Baku to build a clergy house. The application was granted and in 1903 a three-room mud brick house was built. A Bible altar in a gilded silver frame and silver dishes were purchased for the church at the expense of the donor State Counselor N.I. Kolosov. Over time, all the necessary sacramental accessories, vessels and liturgical books were acquired. The church had a small library with theological and historical books.

== Fate ==
It is not known what happened to the temple during the Soviet period, it does not exist now.

== Priests and years of activity ==
- Iohan Meiparianov (1892-1893)
- Abraham Abazadze (1893-1901)
- Dmitry Kirichenko (1901-?)

== Sources ==
- Русская Проваславная Церковь Московского Патриархата (2021). ЦЕРКОВЬ СВЯТИТЕЛЯ НИКОЛАЯ ЧУДОТВОРЦА СЕЛЕНИЯ ПЕТРОПАВЛОВКА (САБИРАБАД). Официальный сайт Бакинской и Азербайджанской епархии.
