= Mughan Mahal =

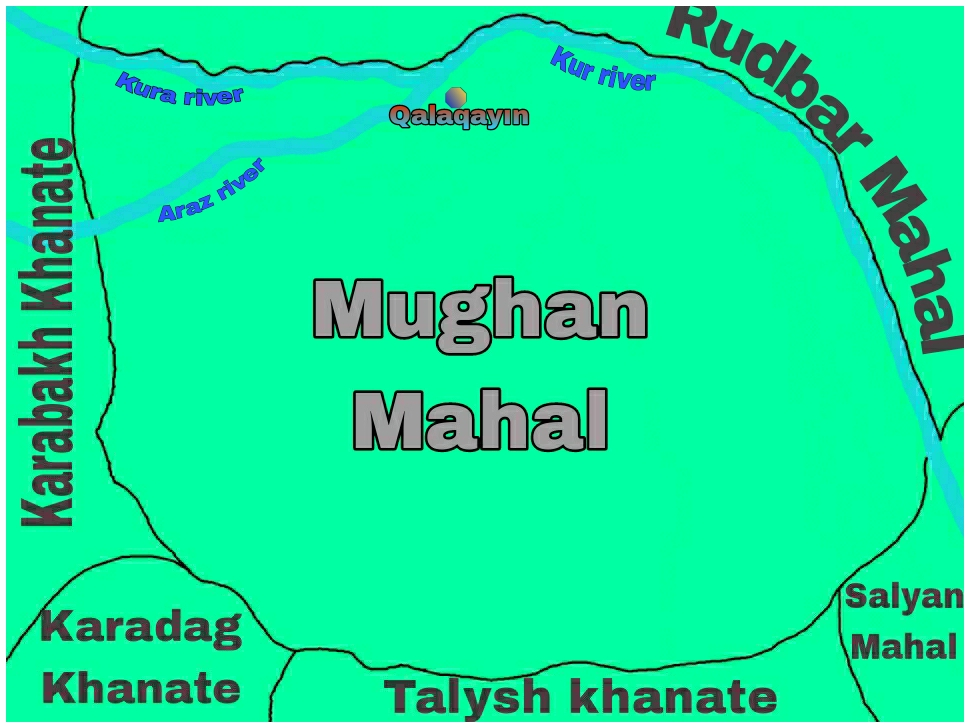
Mughan Mahal in the 18th century.

Mughan Mahal (later Cavad prefecture, Petropavlovka okrug) was one of the historical-geographical and administrative territories within the Mughan plain.

== History ==
The Mughan Mahal was present in Sabirabad and Saatly Districts. The district governor was Hasan Khan.

== Population ==
In 1821, one fortress (Qalaqayın) and 44 hamlets (some of which are known as Bildik, Ulucali-Khalphali, Mammishli, Kurkandi, Jangan, First Ranjbars, Murids, Second Ranjbars, Garagli, Minbashi, Molla Vaizli, Damamayagali, Ali Sultanli, Şahadlı, Gushtan, Molday, Mustafabeyli, Hashimkhanli, Potular) hosted 500 families.

== Economy ==
The residents of the Mughan Mahal were engaged in agriculture, cattle breeding and cotton.

== Source ==
- (in Russian) Описание Ширванской провинции, составленное в 1820 году, по распоряжению главноуправляющего в Грузии А.П.Ермолова, генерал-майором Мадатовым и действительным статским советником Могилевским. — Тифлис: типография Главного Управления наместника Кавказского, 1867. — Number of pages: 287.
- "MOḠĀN". Encyclopædia Iranica.

== See also ==
- Rudbar Mahal
