= Balvar =

Village and municipality in Sabirabad District, Azerbaijan

Balvar Balvar
- Village
- Location of Balvar within Azerbaijan
- Coordinates: 40°03′06″N 48°28′40″E
- Country: Azerbaijan
- District: Sabirabad

Population
  - Total: 379
- Time zone: UTC+4 (AZT)

Balvar (also rendered historically as Balvarı and Balvary) is a small village and municipal jurisdiction located within the Sabirabad District of Azerbaijan. Situated in the eastern lowlands of the country, the settlement serves as a localized agricultural and residential center within its regional administrative framework. According to recent municipal demographic registries, the village has a total recorded population of 379 inhabitants, who are primarily employed in local agriculture and rural trade.

== Geography and climate ==
Balvar is positioned within the central geographic plains of Azerbaijan, a region characterized by its flat, low-lying terrain and proximity to major regional river valleys. The local landscape is dominated by open fields and modified agricultural plains, which rely heavily on managed irrigation networks fed by nearby waterways. The climate of the region is predominantly semi-arid, featuring hot, dry summer months and mild, relatively low-precipitation winters. This climatic profile heavily influences the daily life, vegetation, and economic capabilities of the village community.

== Administrative history ==
The village has undergone legislative adjustments to align its identity with modernized national mapping standards. Under the official Law of the Republic of Azerbaijan No. 727-IIQ, enacted on 1 September 2004, the settlement—which was previously designated as Balvarı while operating under the broader Surra village administrative territorial district within the Sabirabad Rayon—was formally renamed to its current simplified spelling of Balvar.

Today, the village functions as an independent municipality, allowing local representatives to manage domestic community services, infrastructure maintenance, and land distribution policies under the oversight of the centralized Sabirabad District leadership.

== Economy and infrastructure ==
The socioeconomic structure of Balvar is fundamentally tied to agrarian production. Due to the rich alluvial soils of the surrounding plains, local families engage heavily in the cultivation of regional cash crops, particularly cotton, grain varieties, and seasonal vegetables. Livestock farming, including the raising of sheep and cattle, also represents a critical component of household income and local food security.

Transportation and connectivity for the village rely on a network of secondary rural roads that link Balvar to neighboring municipal sectors and connect residents directly to the primary highway systems leading to the regional capital of Sabirabad and the national capital city of Baku.

== See also ==
- Administrative divisions of Azerbaijan
