= Mughan plain =

Plain in northwest Iran and southern part of the Republic of Azerbaijan

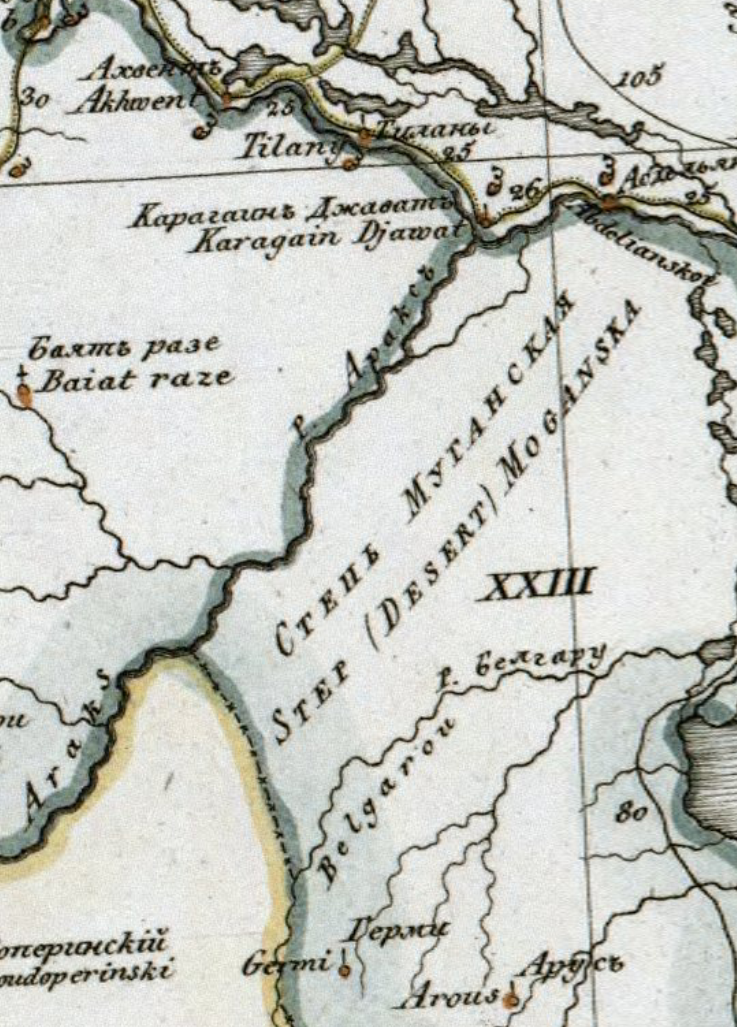
Russian map from 1823

Mughan plain (Azerbaijani: Muğan düzü, مغان دوزو; Persian: دشت مغان, romanized: Dasht-e Moghān) is a plain stretching from northwestern Iran to the southern part of the Republic of Azerbaijan. It is located on the bank of the Aras river extending to Iran.

The section of the Mughan plain which lies in the Republic of Azerbaijan has the higher density of irrigation canals. Parsabad, Jafarabad, Germi and Aslan Duz cities lie in the Iranian part, while Cəlilabad, Bilasuvar, Saatli, and Sabirabad cities lie in Azerbaijani side.

By the Chalcolithic period (c. 4500–3500 BCE), the Mughan Plain was integrated into the sphere of the Kura–Araxes culture, a major cultural phenomenon in the South Caucasus known for its red-black pottery and early metallurgical development. These communities built fortified settlements, cultivated crops, and developed trans-regional trade networks.

== Sasanian era and Urbanisation ==
During the Sasanian era (224–651 CE), the Mughan Plain was part of a strategic border region. Fortified cities like Ultan Qalasi and elevated mounds such as Nader Tepesi reveal advanced settlement structures, including irrigation systems and citadel-like layouts. These reflect a well-organized administrative presence in the region.

The Sasanian Empire used the Mughan Plain as a route for military and economic operations, and remnants of coinage, pottery, and civic planning illustrate the integration of the area into broader imperial networks.

== History ==
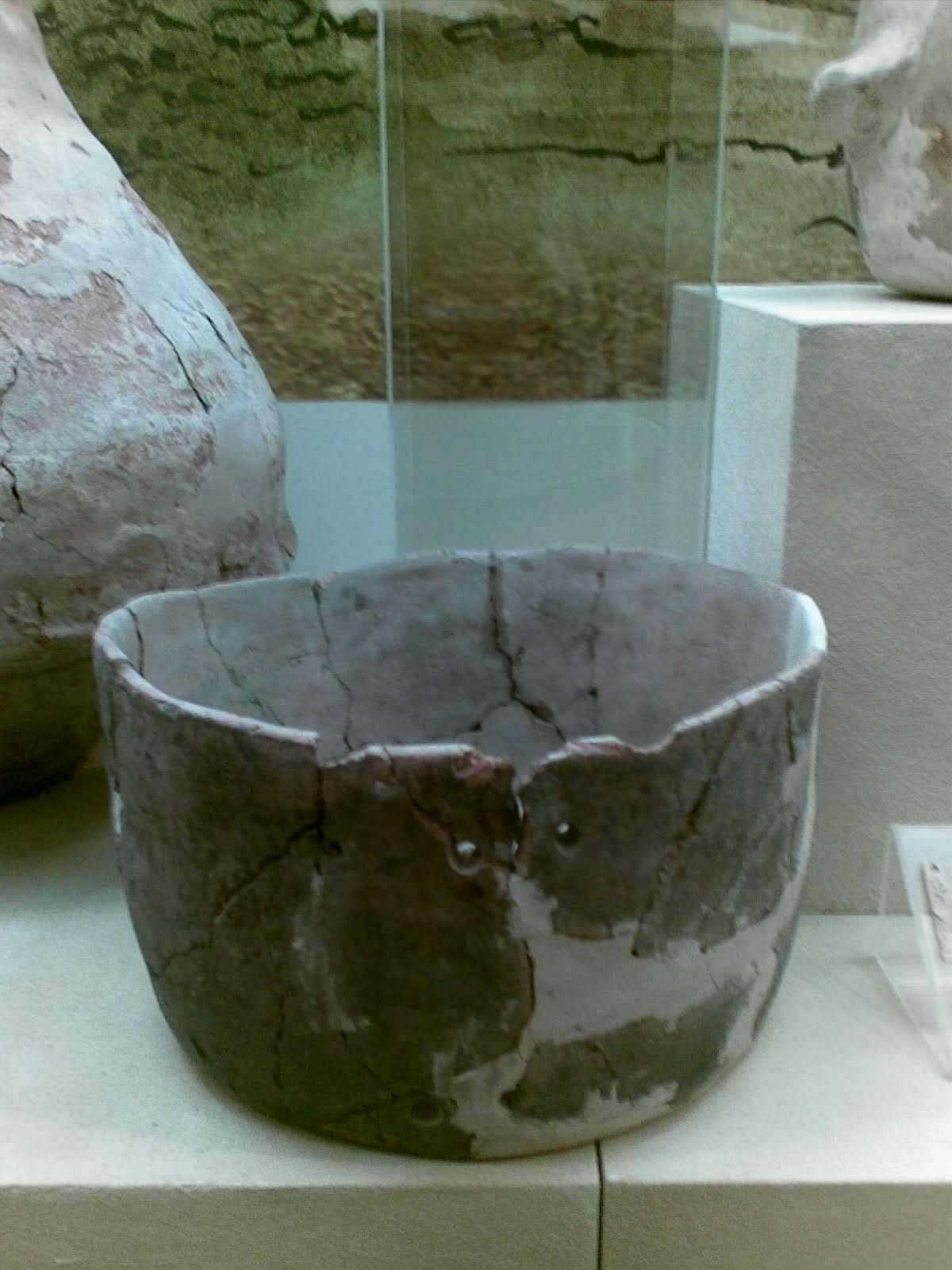
Ancient pottery from Alikomektepe, c. 5000–4500 BC

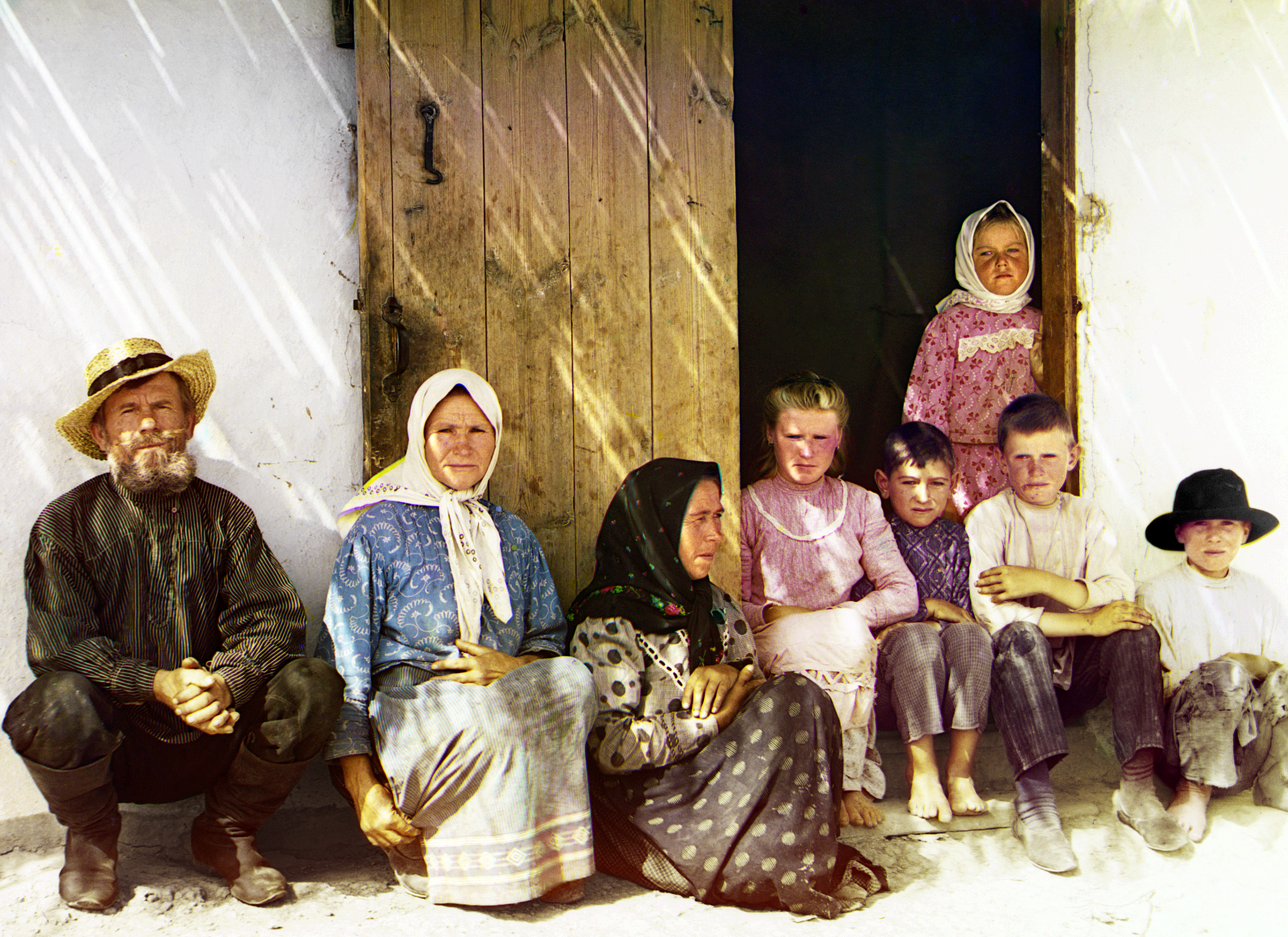
Russian settlers in the Mughan steppe of Azerbaijan, photographed by Sergey Prokudin-Gorsky between 1905 and 1915

The ancient settlement of Alikomektepe, dating to c. 5000 BC, is located in the Mughan plain and covers an area of over 1 hectare. Early levels belonged to Shulaveri-Shomu culture. The Mughan culture was later centered in the area. Mughan was a province of the Abbasid Caliphate, in present-day Iranian Azerbaijan. Mughan District was one of the administrative divisions of Shirvan Khanate. After 1820, the Shirvan Khanate was conquered by the Russian Empire.

== Maps ==
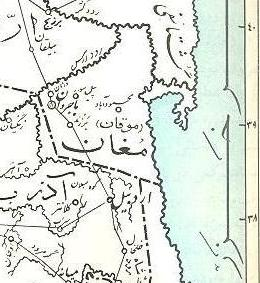
In Abbasid Caliphate

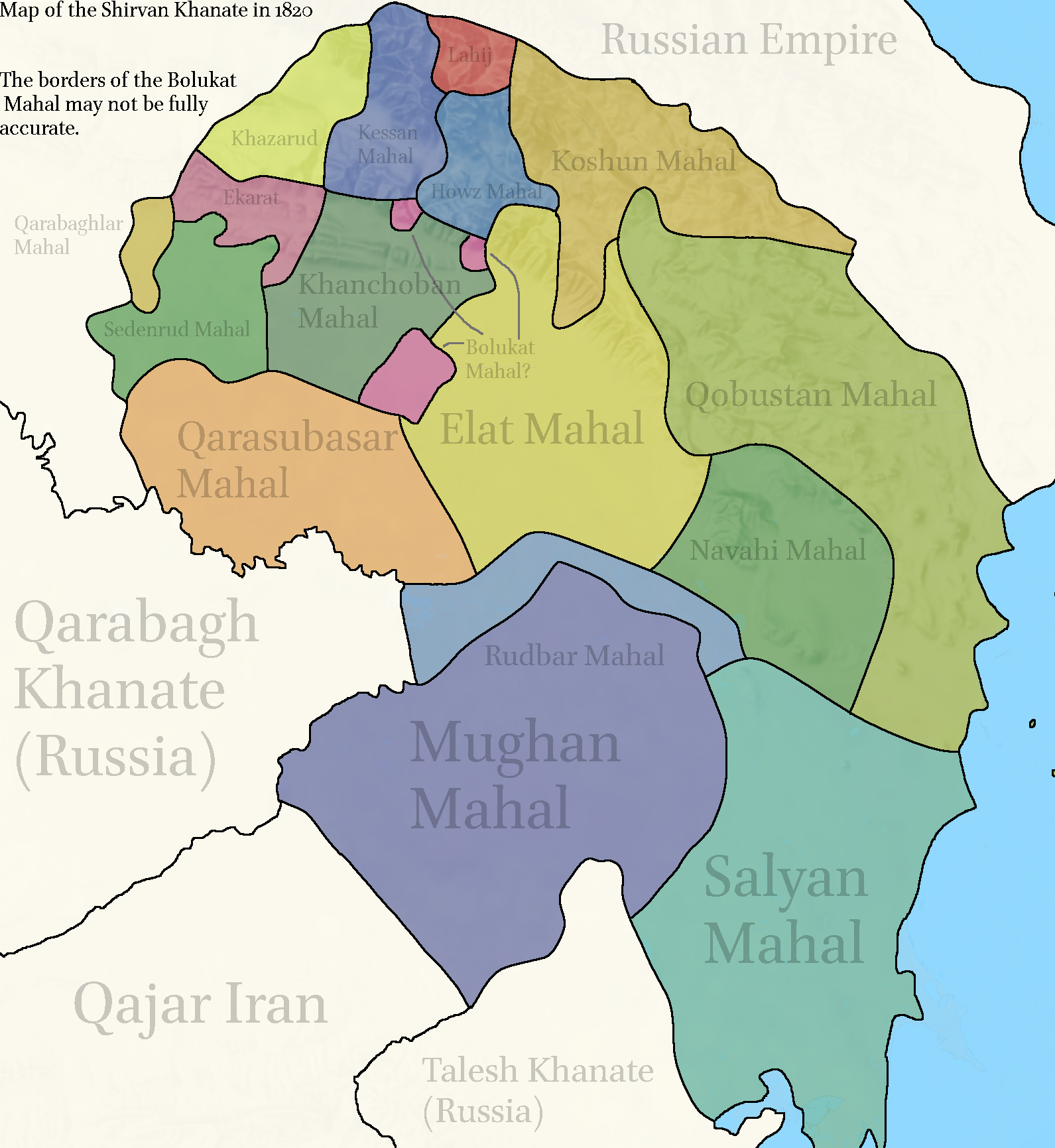
In the Shirvan Khanate

== See also ==
- Mil plain
- Garayazi plain
- Arran (Caucasus)
- Azerbaijan–Iran border
- Mughan (province)
