= Hasan Khan Shahseven =

Ruler of Javad Khanate under the suzerainty of Quba (18th century)

Hasan Khan
- Born: 1712; Galagain; Javad Khanate, Safavid Iran
- Died: March 29, 1789; Shamkir, Shamshaddil Sultanate

Hasan Khan Shahseven (1712, Galagain, Safavid Iran – 1789, Shamkir, Shamshaddil Sultanate) was the ruler of Javad Khanate under the suzerainty of the Quba Khanate.

== Life ==
Hasan Khan was the ruler of Javad, Mughan, in the second half of the 18th century. Hasan Khan is mentioned in some sources as "Taleh Hasan Khan", "Tala Hasan Khan". Hasan Khan has been the vassal of Fatali Khan since 1768. He had participated in many battles on the side of the Quba Khanate.In 1778, the ruler of Gilan, Hidayat khan attacked Javad by Karim Khan Zand's order and captured Hasan khan. Hasan khan was released from prison for some time.

In 1783, Fatali Khan attacked to Karabakh with 13,000 troops. Interpreter Mustafa Murtazaliev, ordered by Qraf Voinovich, found the Fatali Khan in Aghdam. Shamakhi ruler Mahammadsaid Khan and his brother Aghasi Khan, Sheki ruler Haji Abdulqadir Khan, Mughan ruler Taleh Hasan Khan, Shamkhalate of Tarki Murtuza Ali, Lankaran ruler Gara Khan, Bamat of Buynaksk, Qaytak ruler Ustarhan, Kantugay ruler Ahmed Khan, Tavlin ruler Khazbulat Alibeyov were in Fatali Khan's camp. Understanding the impossibility of resisting this force, Ibrahim Khalil Khan took refuge in Shusha and waited for the case.

Fatali Khan in 1784 appointed Hassan Khan to Ardabil as ruler.

Abbasgulu Bakikhanov writes: "That same year, Fatali Khan went to Ardebil and Shahsevan's emirates followed him, Muganian Hasan khan was also sincere."

Hasan Khan died in 1789.

== Family ==
Hasan Khan had a son named Safi Khan.

== Sources ==
- Anvar Chingizoglu (2009). Derivatives of Hasan Khan. "Soy",2 (22). pp. 13–17.
- Абдуллаев, Г.Б. (1965). Азербайджан в XVIII веке и взаимоотношения его с Россией. Баку: Изд-во Академии наук Азербайджанской ССР. p. 620.
- Валуев П. Н. ред. И. П. Петрушевский (1942). Фатали-хан Кубинский. Баку: Изд-во АзФАН.
- Abbasgulu Bakikhanov (1991). Gulustani İram (PDF). «Elm».
- Родословная таблица Кубинских ханов //-Акты, собранные Кавказской археографической комиссией. Тифлис — Т. VI, ч.II. 1875. p. 907.
