= Mohsenabad, Sarab =

Mohsenabad محسن اباد
- Village
- Location within Iran
- Coordinates: 37°51′00″N 47°25′00″E
- Country: Iran
- Province: East Azerbaijan
- County: Sarab
- Bakhsh: Central
- Rural District: Abarghan

Population (2006)
  - Total: 338
- Time zone: UTC+3:30 (IRST)
  - Summer (DST): UTC+4:30 (IRDT)

Mohsenabad (Persian: محسن اباد, also Romanized as Moḩsenābād; also known as Gavdūshābād) is a village in Abarghan Rural District, in the Central District of Sarab County, East Azerbaijan Province, Iran. At the 2006 census, its population was 338, in 65 families.
