= Qalaqayın =

Galagain Qalaqayın
- Municipality
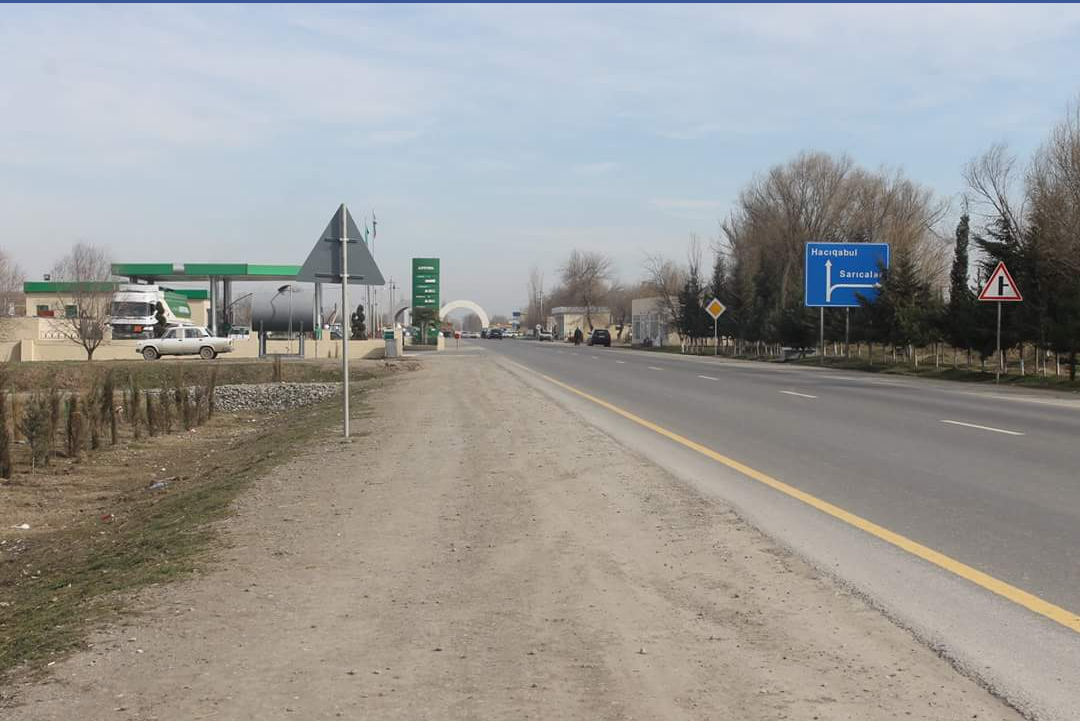

- Location within Azerbaijan
- Coordinates: 39°58′41″N 48°27′43″E
- Country: Azerbaijan
- Rayon: Sabirabad
- Established date: 4th century

Government
  - Executive representative: Israfil Aslanov

Area
  - Total: 2,712 km^{2} (1,047 sq mi)
- Elevation: −28 m (−92 ft)

Population (2021)
  - Total: 7,658
  - Density: 276/km^{2} (710/sq mi)
- Demonym: galagaini. Azerbaijani: qalaqayınlı
- Time zone: UTC+4 (AZT)
  - Summer (DST): UTC+5 (AZT)
- Postal code: AZ 5423
- Area code: (+994)2376

Qalaqayın, also known as Galagain or Kalagayny, is a village and the most populous municipality, except for the capital Sabirabad, in the Sabirabad Rayon of Azerbaijan. It has a population of 7,658.

It was home to the fortress of the historic Javad Khanate and the center of the Mughan district.

== History ==
The ancient village of Sabirabad, one of the oldest villages and one of the ethnotopians, is Galagayin. The date of the beginning of the history belongs to the 4th century. Unfortunately, there is no information about the early period. "Mughan land" known as "Khavar Zemin", i.e. "Gunashli soil", the Turks, the Persians, and other alien invaders were persecuted but overpowered by all the attacks of the enemy, turned into an imprinted castle. From that time on, "Khavar Zemin" was replaced by the name of Galagain.

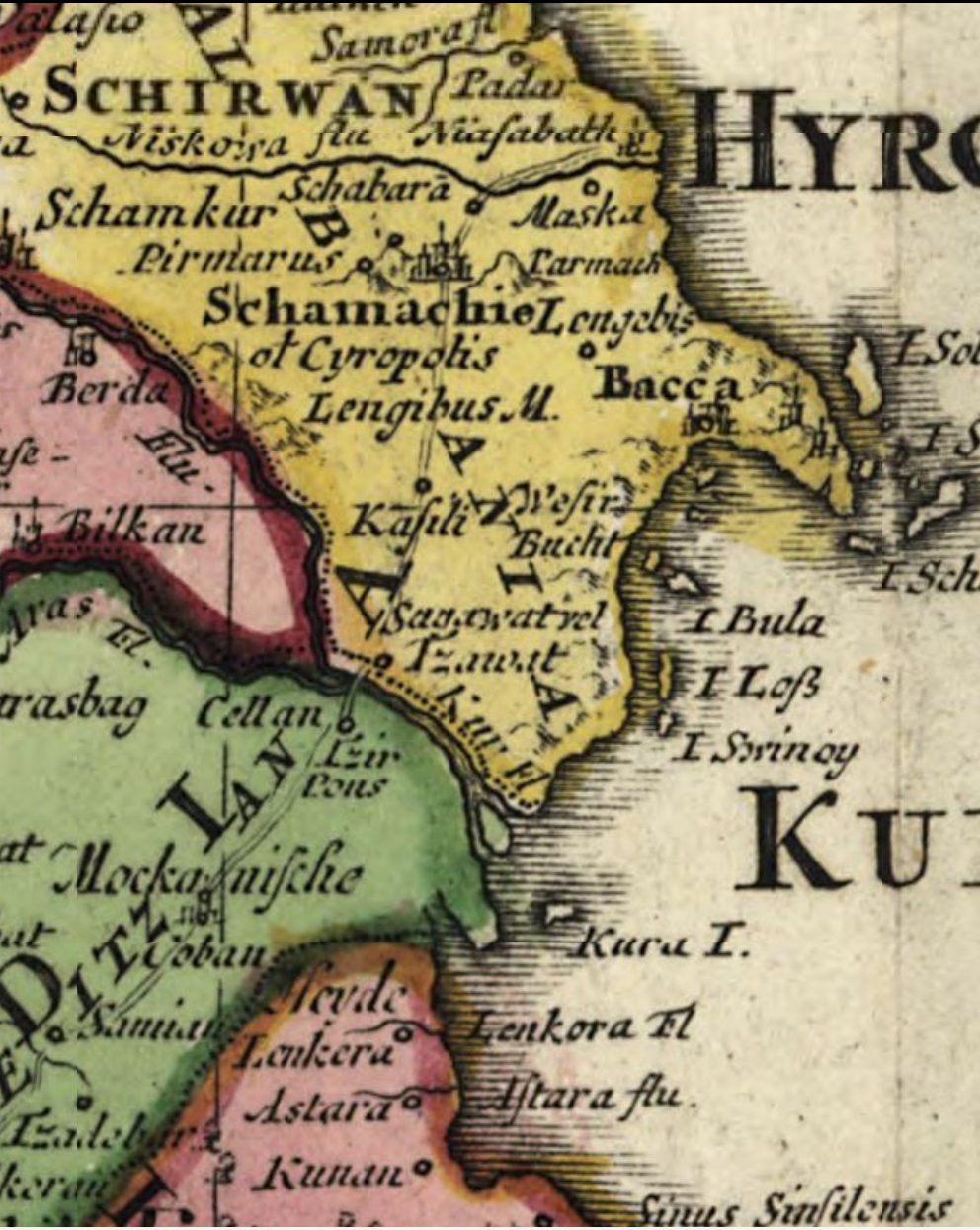
Galagain (Cellan).During the year 1730

According to historians, the provisional orders were sent to all provinces of the state "every corner of the state" for the congress to be held on March 21, 1736, and the judges, provincial chiefs, officers and scribes called to Galagain-Mughan congress near Javad pass. It was also noted that in the place where Kur and Araz encounters, 12,000 houses were planted near the Javad passage, as well as caravanserais, mosques and tombs. About 100,000 people were gathered there. For Nader Shah, there were large tents with silk fabrics and fragments. They were decorated with countless gold, silver and other stone items. In the tent, Nadera's guests were offered excellent dishes without interruptions between gold and silver bottles. Their singers and khanandas the horseman and the playwrights were entertaining and entertaining. The city was full of wounds, famine and famine, and the roads were full of ridiculous wounds, and the cramped losers who lost their usefulness in countless battles. Even Agha Mohammad Shah Qajar has proclaimed himself a Shah in Galagain.

Hasan Khan Shahseven, the ruler of Javad, was born in Galagain. The date of birth was unknown, but died in 1789. The name of the sons was Mohammad Salah khan and Ibrahim Khan. At that time khanates strengthened relations with marriage.The Mohammadsalah Khan of Qalaqayın's daughters Khairunnisa married to the ruler of the Talysh Khanate, Mir Hassan khan, and Parijahan the lady to Mostafa Khan, the last khan of the Shirvan. After the division of Javad khanate, most of the lands were split into 2 main districts. Rudbar and Mughan.

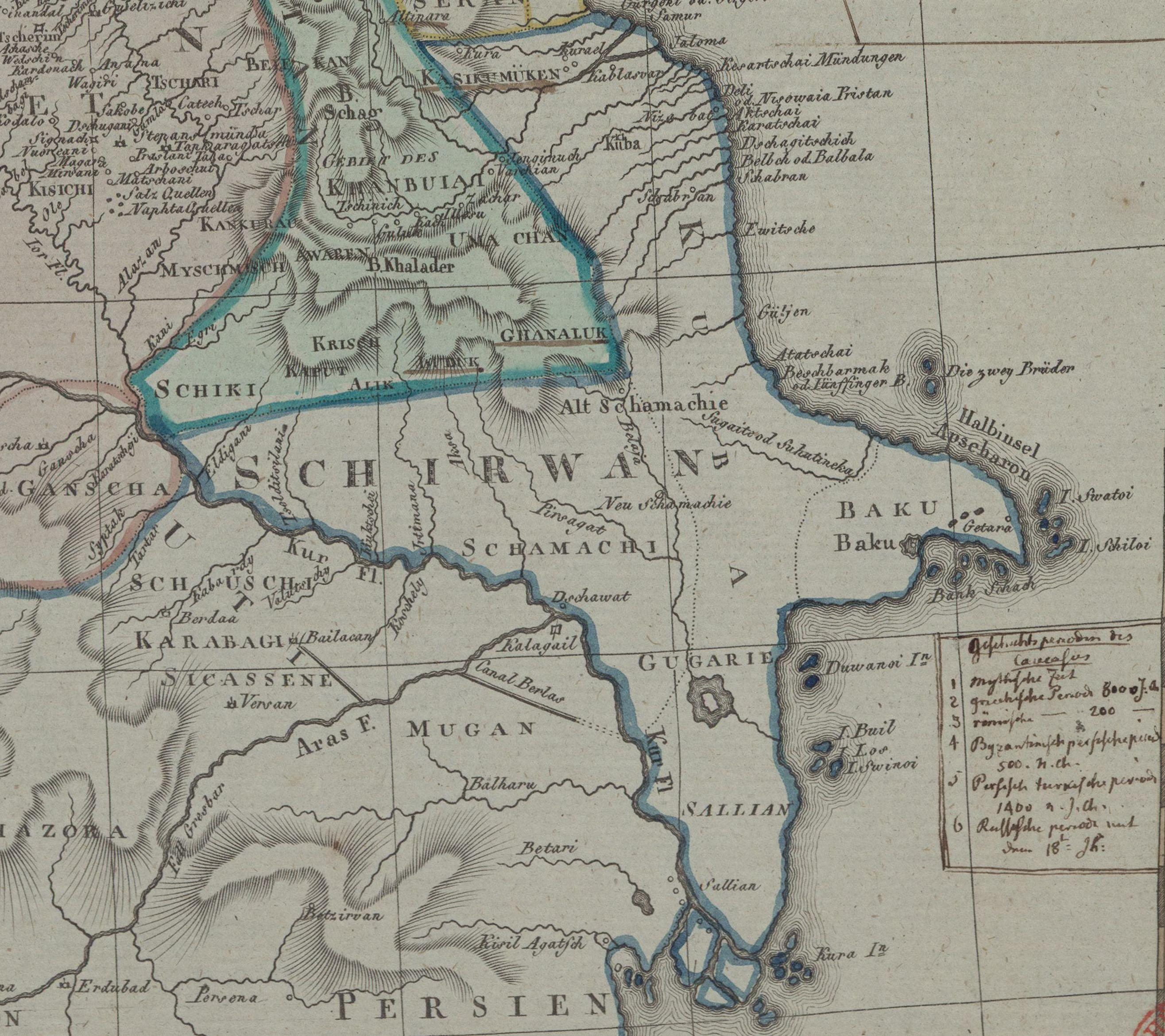
Galagain (Kalagail).During the year 1804

In 1820 there was a castle fortress connected to the Javad Khanate (central present Javad village) in the past. 1 fortress (Galagain) and 44 area (some of them are known as: Bildik, Ulucali-Khalphali, Mammishli, Kurkandi, Jangen, First Ranjbars, Murids, Second Ranjbars, Garagli, Minbashi, Molla Vaizli, Deymaydaghli, Ali Sultanli, Shakhatli, Gushtan, Melday, Mustafabeyli, Hashamkhanli, Potular) were 500 families. The governor of the Mughal district was sitting in the castle. The governor of the Mugan district was Hasan khan, then his cousin Mustafa bey. In Galagain's fortress, it was noted that up to 100 families were settled, in general, 400 families lived in the Mughan district.300 families were paying taxes. The list of beys is given in the table. Documents about the cameral description of Shirvan province population, compiled by board registrar Sushko, indicate that there were 468 families in 19 villages of Mughan, where 1216 male population lived.

=== List of beys in the Mughan district (1820th year) ===
1-2	Memmed Rza bey	Melik bey
3-4	Mohammad Ali bey	Abdulla bey
5-6	Yolchu bey	Safi Mirze bey
7-8	Ahmad bey	Molla Abdulla
9-10	Cemshid bey	Mohammad Huseyin bey
11-12	Agha bey	Asadullah bey
13-14	Mohammad Khalif bey	Shahmurad bey
15-16	Kalbelai bey	Abdullah Huseyin bey
17-18	MelikMemmed bey	Ali khan
19-20	Ahmad Ali bey	Ali bey
21-22	Talib bey	Sharif bey
23-24	Memmed Ali bey	Huseyin bey
25-26	Jafar bey	Meshedi Hasan Ali bey
27-28	Ahmad bey	Mehmed bəy
29-30	The source cannot be read	Josuz bey
31-32	Ali Memmed bey	Potu bey
33-34	Ali Mirze bey	Akhund Qasım bey
35-36	Agha Rahim bey	Seyid Qasım bey
37-38	Allahverdi bey	Ibrahim bəy

Note: The table was compiled on the basis of the description of Shirvan province, which was carried out by General Madatov in 1820 (126, p. 244-253)

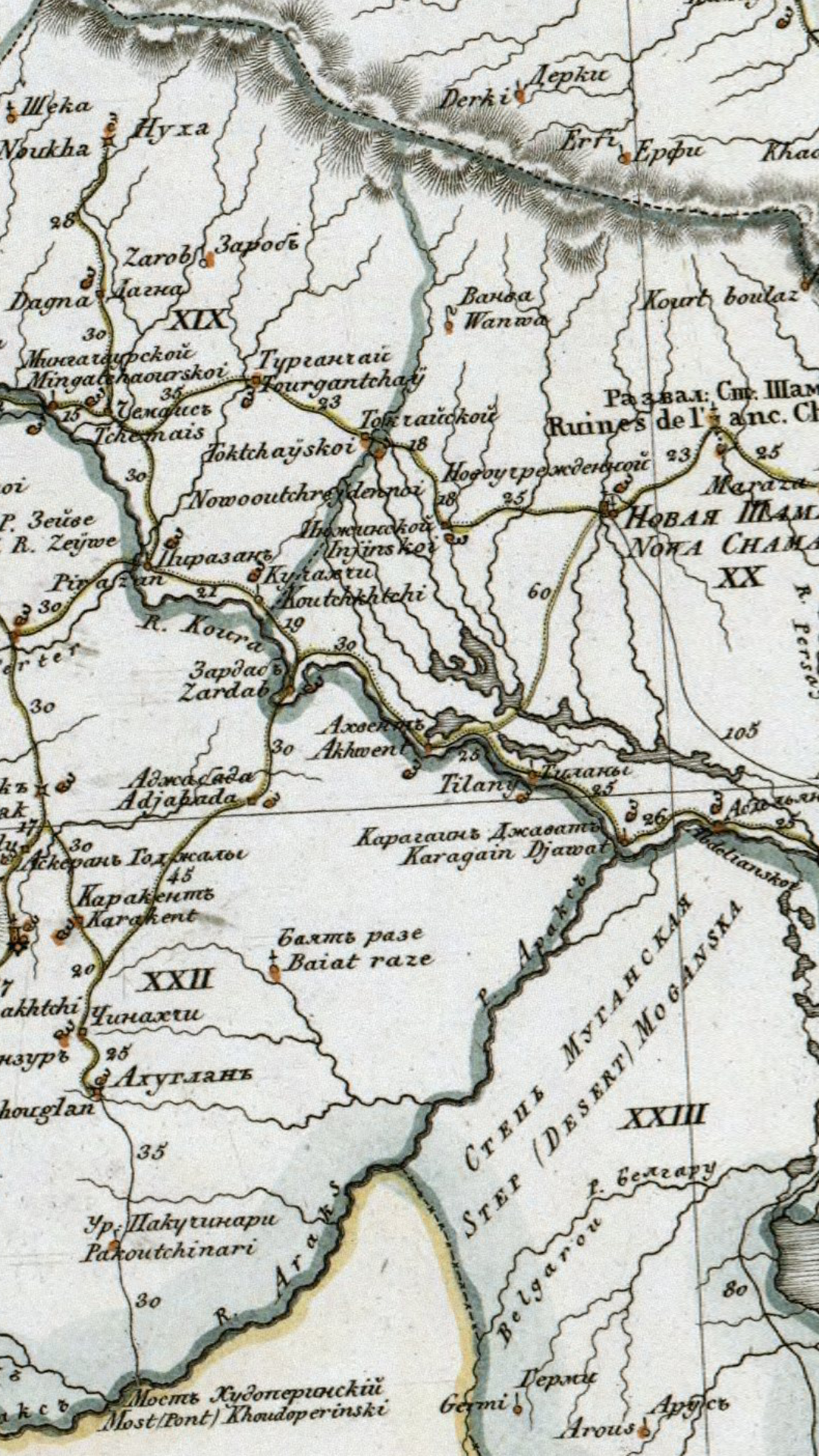
Galagain.During the year 1823

There was a painting house with a rent of 150 rouble of shirvan in Galagain. The rent was earlier given to Mustafa Khan (until 1820). Each cargo of the caravan passing through the territory of Mugan from Iran and elsewhere were 6 abbas for the benefit of the county. There were 6 salt lakes in 6 trees in the Galagain. While the indigenous people were using tax payers for salt lakes, those coming to salt from other parts of the province of Shirvan should have been given one abbasi each load. The Mughani people living behind the Kur were exempt from the other taxes and duties, besides the chervon (the 10-inch gold coin). Instead, the Mughanians should avoid any danger from the Iranian side, from Mughan against Russia, should be guards and always be ready for military service. Thus, the Mughan people were paying approximately 1 chevron tax for each family in the treasury. In 1820, when the khan of the Shirvan Khanate, Mustafa Khan moved to Iran, many families from the province of Shirvan fled to Iran. The Mugan district was not an exception. During the deportation of Mustafa Khan, those who were dissatisfied with the khan were dispersed to other khanates. 50 families from Mughan to the Talysh Khanate, and 60 families went to the Garabagh khanate. Although the families fleeing to the Talysh Khanate in 1820 returned, Mehdikulu Khan had not yet returned those who went to the Karabakh khanate.

=== Location of villages in the territory of Mughan ===
Ordinal numeral	Villages	Number of yards	Male sex
1	Beylik	31	79
2	The source cannot be read	13	39
3	Memishli	23	61
4	Kürkandi	13	47
5	Chengen	13	29
6	Ranjbar-1	16	46
7	The source cannot be read	2	3
8	Ranjbar-2	13	29
9	Gıraghly	24	46
10	Mınbashıh	18	52
11	Potubeyli	28	67
12	Molla-Vaızlı	24	90
13	The source cannot be read	31	79
14	Ali-Sultanly	24	58
15	Saatly	28	67
16	Ouzman	24	65
17	Molday	27	66
18	Mustafa beyly	20	60
19	GALAGAİN	96	233
Total	19	468	1216

Note: The table was compiled on the basis of the cameral description of Shirvan province population in 1831, carried out by the board member of the Treasury Expedition of the Georgian Government Sushko

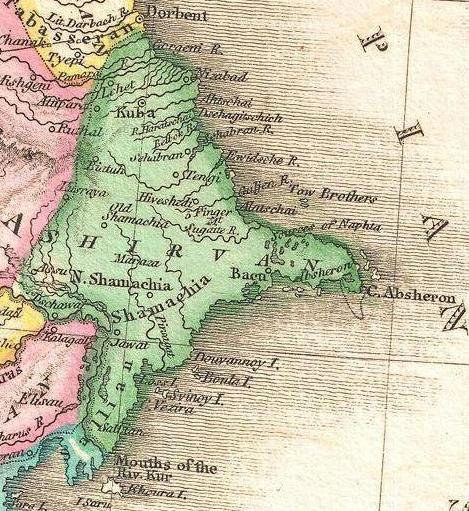
Galagain.During the year 1818.

== Archaeological and historical cultural monuments ==
Ancient settlements and necropolis in the territory of Galagain village were built in the vicinity of V - I centuries, V - II, b.e. It belongs to the 1st and 3rd centuries. Additionally, there is also a mosque of Galagain, founded in 1657 in the Safavid era.

== Geography ==
Galagain village located in the north-western part of Sabirabad district is bordered by Saatli district only. The climate is dry subtropical climate. Here, there is a mild-warm semi-desert and dry desert climate that lasts throughout the year. There are many sunny hours throughout the area. This has a positive impact on the development of the plant. The soil is mainly gray-brown, gray-brown soils. It is 28 meters below sea level and 17 meters below the ocean level.

== Infrastructure ==
There are iron and concrete plants, schools, medical centers, post offices, ATS and 3 mosques.

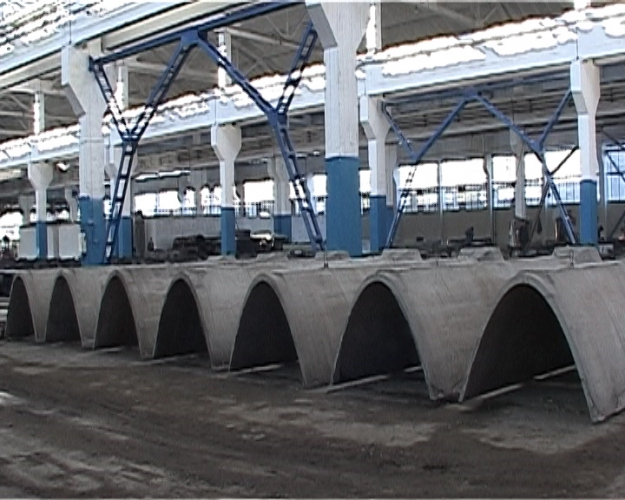
Reinforced concrete plant.

== Landscape and biological features ==
The climate is characterized by the mild-warm semi-desert and dry desert climate. The desert plants are also present in some areas. Saline soils are also found in desert plants. In saline semidescopes often occurs on halophytes: black-brown, cherry orange. They form tuberous hills. Here, also, the Khazar shakhsevdisi, the cabbage rhinoceros, the caterpillar, as well as the one-year rugs - the salty bull and so on. plants are encountered. In the semi-desert region, wormwood, marginal and ephemeral ephemeral semi-circles are widely spread in the region. Wide range of wormwood is used under cotton and grain crops.

== Population ==
The population is 7489 people. (Until January 2018)

== Gallery ==
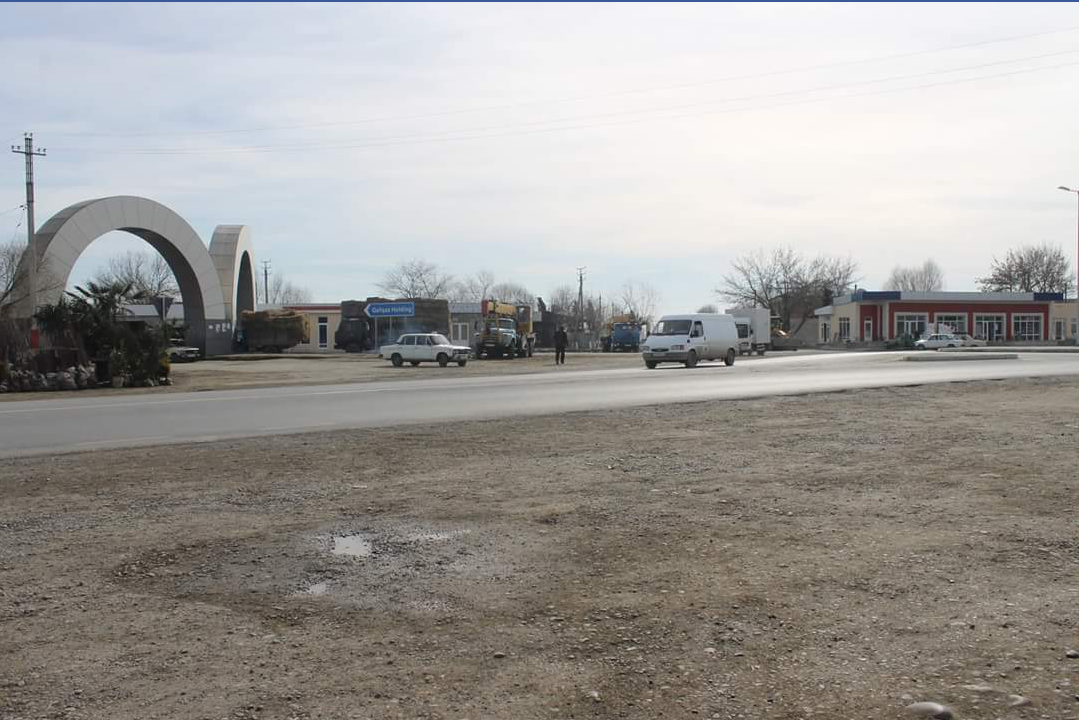
Galagain Circle.

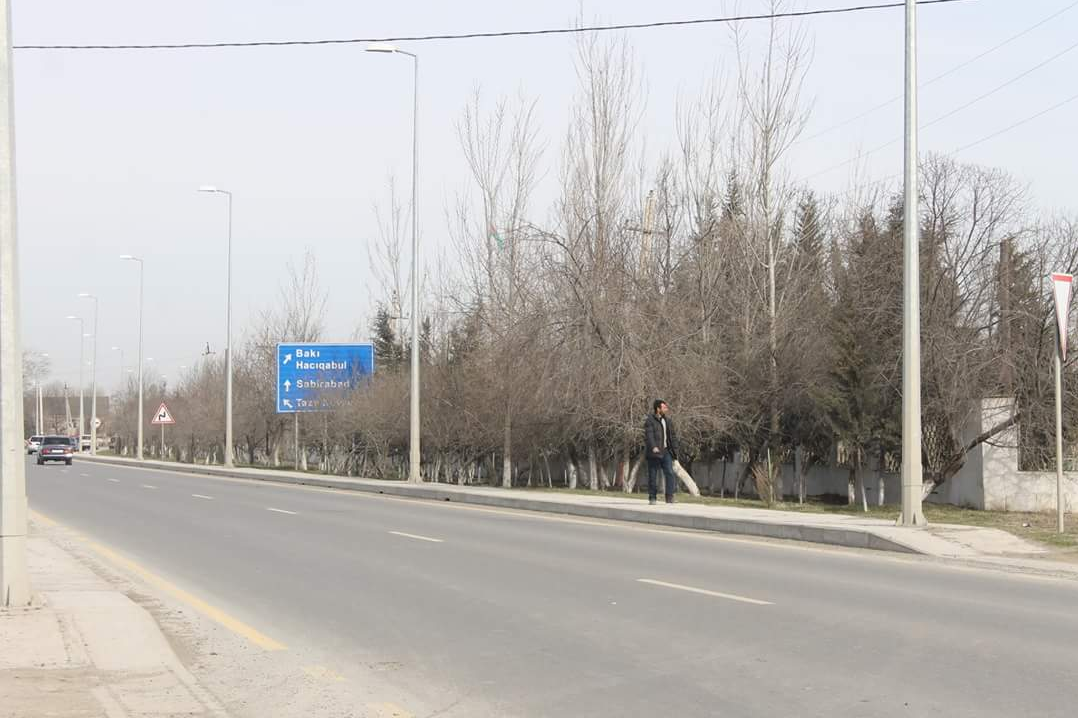
Cemetery.

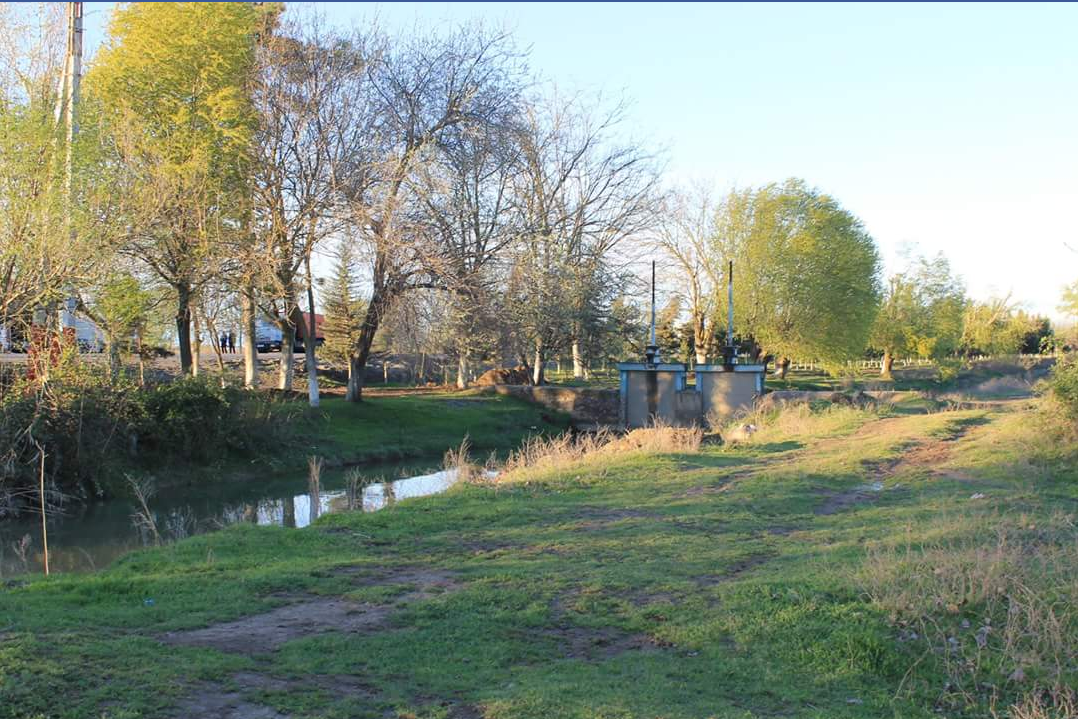
Water channel.The gateway.

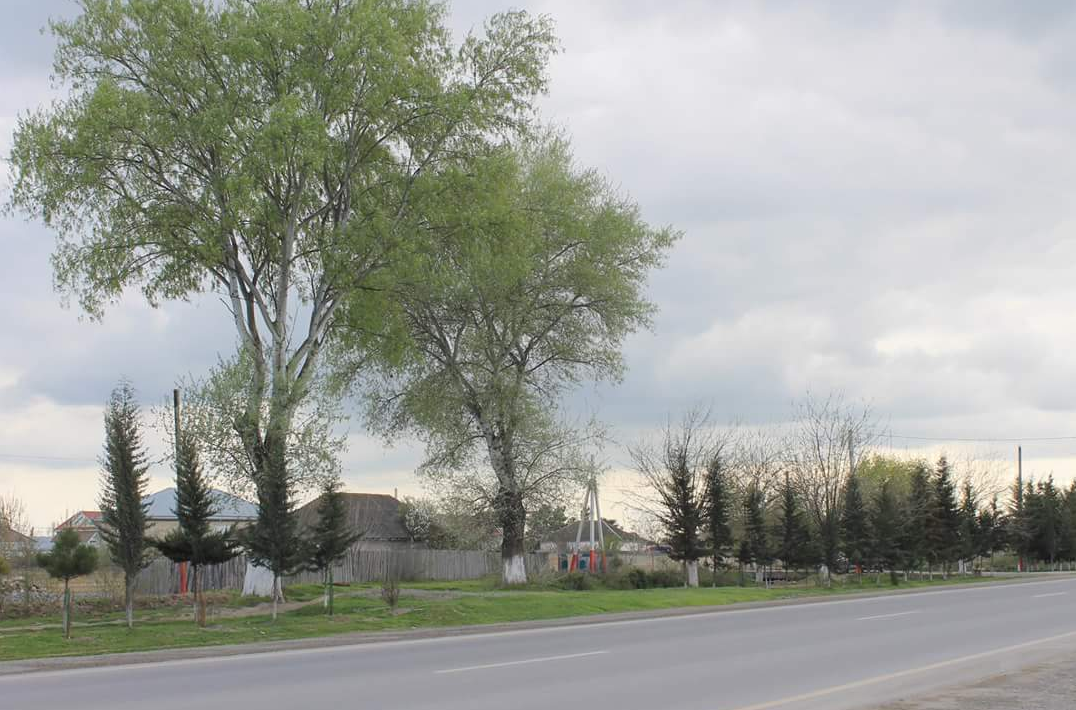
The hawk tree.

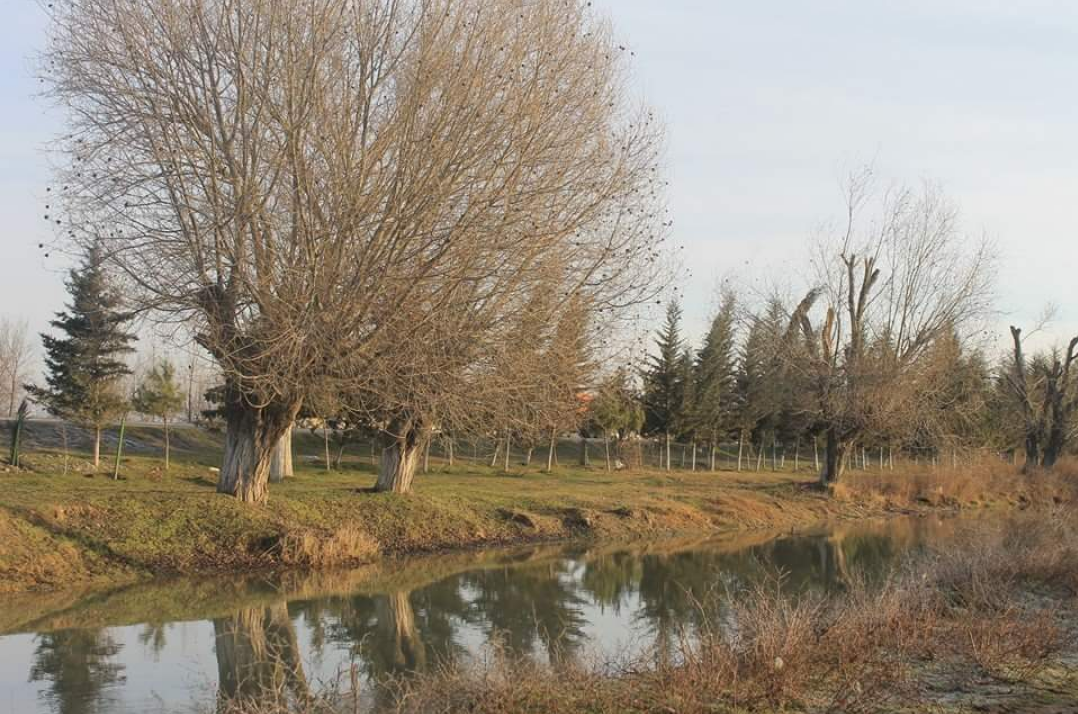
Fir trees.

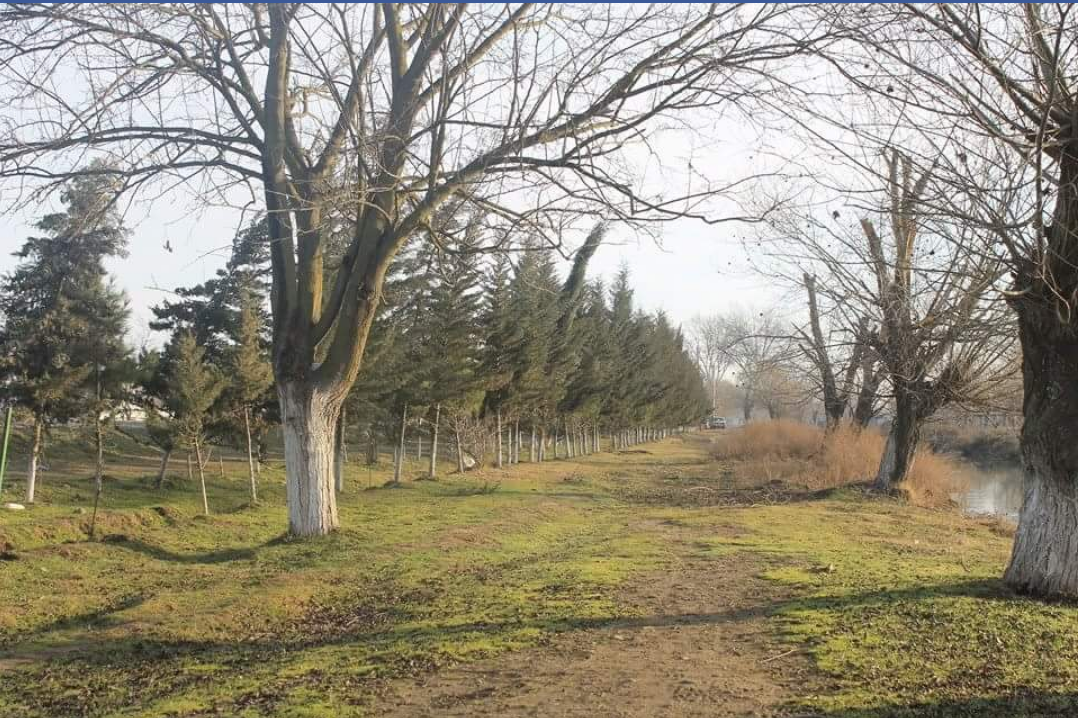
Fir trees.

== See also ==
- Sabirabad District
- Sabirabad
- Javad Khanate
- Djevatskoye Uyezd

== Sources ==
- ŞAHİN FƏRZƏLİYEV (ŞAHİN FAZİL) - tarix elmləri doktoru, professor. Quba xanlığı: əhali tarixi və azadlıq mücadiləsi. Bakı, 2012,336 sah. ISBN 978-9952-453-43-0
- Ənvər Çingizoğlu, Həsən xanın törəmələri, "Soy" dərgisi, 2 (22), Bakı, 2009, səh.13-17,
- Географический атлас Российской империи, Царства Польского и Великого Княжества Финлянского, расположенный по губерниям на двух языках с означением в онных городах, местечек, сель, деревень и всех примичательнийших мест, почтовых и больших проезжих дорог, станций и расстояния между оными, и прочими селениями в верстах и милях на 70 листах с Генеральною картою и Таблицей расстояния верст по почтовым дорогам между знатнийшими городами.Сочинен по новейшим и достоверным сведениям, в пользу обучающихся Российской Географии и для составления дорожников путешественникам,служащих Военно-топографического дела, Его Императорского Величества по квартирмейстерской части подполковником Пядышевым.
