= Sabirabad (city) =

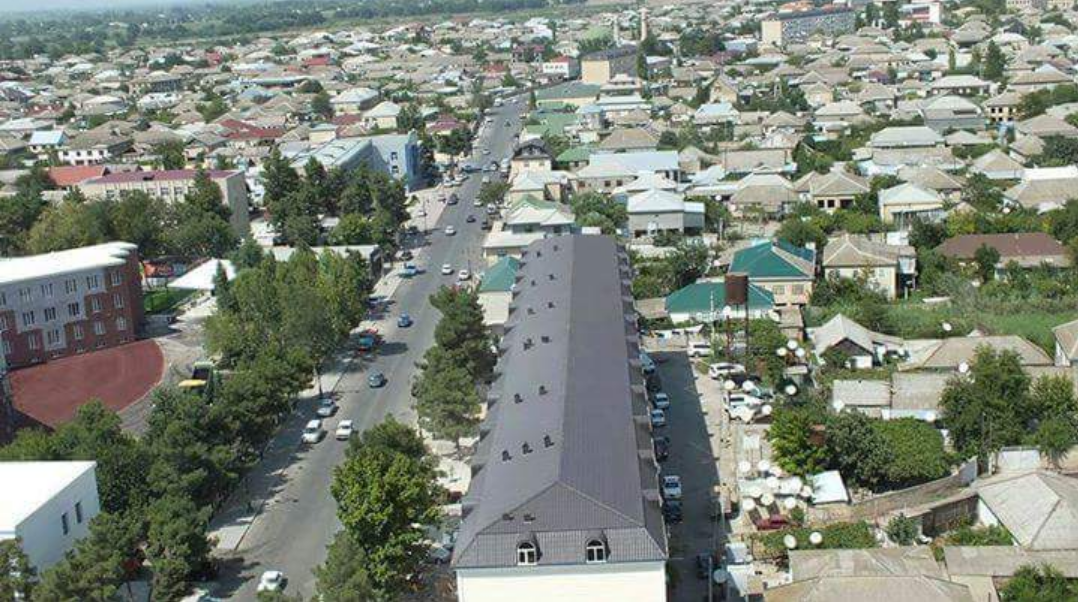

- Location in Azerbaijan
- Coordinates: 40°00′46″N 48°28′44″E
- Country: Azerbaijan
- District: Sabirabad
- Established date: 1888

Government
  - City executive representative: Ahadagha Aliyev

Area
  - Total: 1,246 km^{2} (481 sq mi)
- Elevation: −12 m (−39 ft)

Population (2018)
  - Total: 30,612
  - Density: 2,460/km^{2} (6,400/sq mi)
  - Population Rank in Azerbaijan: 21st
- Time zone: UTC+4 (AZT)
- Area code: +994 21
- Vehicle registration: 54 AZ
- Website: sabirabad-ih.gov.az

Sabirabad (also, Galagayin, Petropavlovka, and Petropavlovskoye) is the capital city of the Sabirabad District of Azerbaijan. The city was renamed in honor of the poet Mirza Alakbar Sabir. Sabirabad is the administrative center of Sabirabad District of the Republic of Azerbaijan. In 1935, the district received the status of subordinate city. Sabirabad is located on the right bank of the Kura River. In the vicinity of the city of Sugovushan, the Araz River is merged with the Kur River.

== History ==
According to Gulistan Peace Treaty of 12 October 1813, a part of the khanates of Azerbaijan was occupied by the Russians, as well as the territory of Mughan. As a result of the administrative territorial reforms carried out in Russia, a new territory—Javad Uyezd—was established in 1868. Later, a large group of Ukrainian peasants was settled in Javad, and the settlement was referred to as Petropavlovka after 1888.

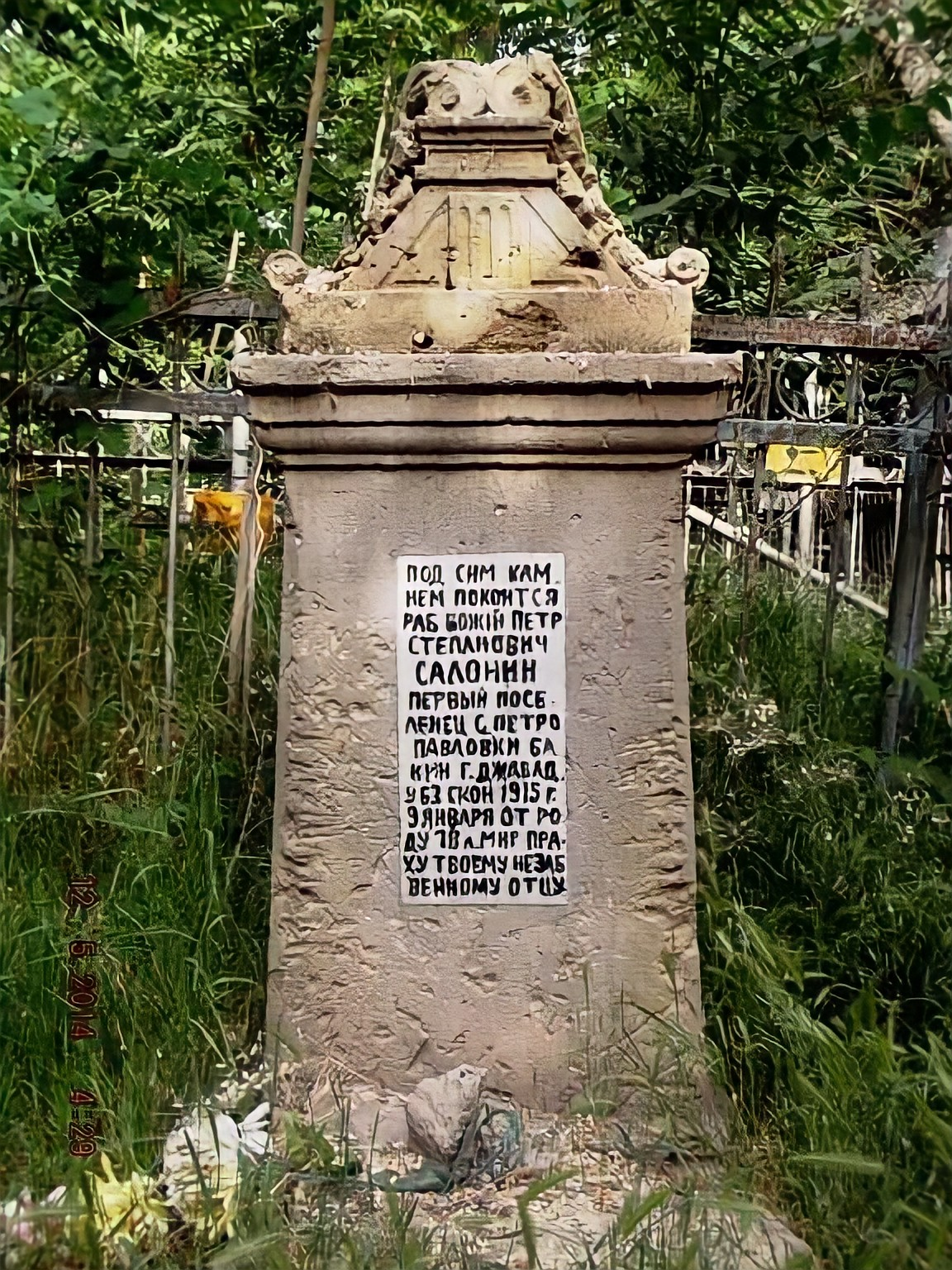
In Russian: On January 9, 1915, Pyotr Stepanovich Solonin, the first inhabitant of the village of Petropavlovka (now Sabirabad city), Javad uyezd of Baku province, was buried under this stone at the age of 78.

Petropavlovka was part of the Javad area (gaza) of the Baku Governorate. In 1901, there were only 87 farms in the area, and in 1907 the number of Russian villages in those areas was 13. In 1913, there was a cotton-cleaning plant, and two industrial enterprises-mills were put into operation. On May 1, 1920, Petropavlovsk became the local state power body of the Revolutionary Committee of the Djevatskoye Uyezd, after Azerbaijan once again came under Russian control following the Soviet offensive that absorbed the Azerbaijan Democratic Republic. From May 1, 1921, to April 8, 1929, Sabirabad region operated as the Petropavlovsk district of Djevatskoye Uyezd . On April 8, 1929, by the decision of the VI All-Azerbaijani Soviet Congress, it was called the Petropavlovsk district of Mugan district. On August 8, 1930, according to the Central Executive Committee's decision # 476, the district system was abolished and Petropavlovsk became an independent region. Almost a year later, on October 7, 1931, by the Decree of the Central Executive Committee of Azerbaijan, Petropavlovsk was renamed after Azerbaijani poet Mirza Alakbar Sabir, considered the founder of public satire in Azerbaijani classical literature.

== Creation of Sabirabad city ==
=== Javad city ===
Ancient Javad was one of the main points on the trade route between Europe and the East. A number of European and Russian travelers and diplomats traveled to Javad, including British Anthony Jenkinson (October 6, 1561), Russians Artemy Sukhanov (1551-1552) and Fyodor Kotov (August 1623), German Adam Olearius (March 31, 1637), Dutchman Jan Jansen Struys (1671-1672), Scottish John Bell, (7 December 1716), and went to Iran, crossing over a bridge over the ships bound by chains.

Some of them wrote here that the town was reminiscent of the city, they have seen many brilliant artisans who produced bricks, cane houses, mud-watered houses, gardens, carpets and various silk fabrics, and even saw weavers. Anthony Jenkinson's remarks, which were in Javad in the Safavid rule, are very interesting. He writes in his October 6, 1562, that "The king's yard has a beautiful palace filled with all kinds of fruits." On his return from Iran in 1563, in Javad on April 6, he met with Abdulla Khan Ustajli, the Shirvan governor in his palace. She also receives a certificate from a gentleman, which permits free trade. In his memoirs A.Jenkinson, reported that the mausoleum was written in his palace in Javad, and was confirmed by the seal of the 12th year of his reign and called himself the "king of Shirvan and Girgan". Javad was a large settlement in the 17th and 18th centuries. Travelers Evliya Çelebi, İ.Lerx, I.Garberq, along with other Shirvan's sights, also saw Javad's "fabric and manufactures" combined with great feudal weavers who produced silk fabrics, carpets and other things, and wrote their own thoughts.

Javad has been an important point in the midst of the 19th centuries, on the sea and the dry trade routes used by the Europeans. Another line of the line called Astrakhan-Rasht road was "Shamakhi-Javad" and "Javad-Lankaran". The Javad's road also became very popular among the people.

Graf Valerian Zubov was camped near Javad on November 21, 1795, when he came to Azerbaijan with the tsarist forces. In this area where the two rivers met, they wanted to set up a city named Yekaterinoserd, to deploy two thousand soldiers there, to marry them with Armenian and Georgian daughters, to provide them with land and agricultural tools. The ships coming from Astrakhan had to vacate their cargo here. They wanted to use this city as a contact point in Georgia, Ganja, Baku, Salyan, Shamakhi and trade with Iran. On March 8, 1736, Nadir Shah was convened here in the place called "Sugovushan", in Galagain, with 100,000 attendees and 20,000 delegates from them. Along with the convention, the agreement, which was discussed with the Ottoman ambassador, was approved at the congress. The name of Javad was given to a major uyezd. It has been a crucial point for a long time on the Kura ship. From the middle of the 19th century the "Baku-Salyan" and "Salyan-Astara" postings were opened. Meanwhile, Javad began to lose its previous significance slowly. But it remained a fishing point for a long time.

=== Sabirabad ===
The history of Sabirabad city begins in 1868. There was a traditional weekly market (Thursday) in the area between the ancient Sugovushan and Galagain villages on Kur and Araz. The first two-storey building and orthodox church is built from the bricks to create a long-awaited city of Javad this year.

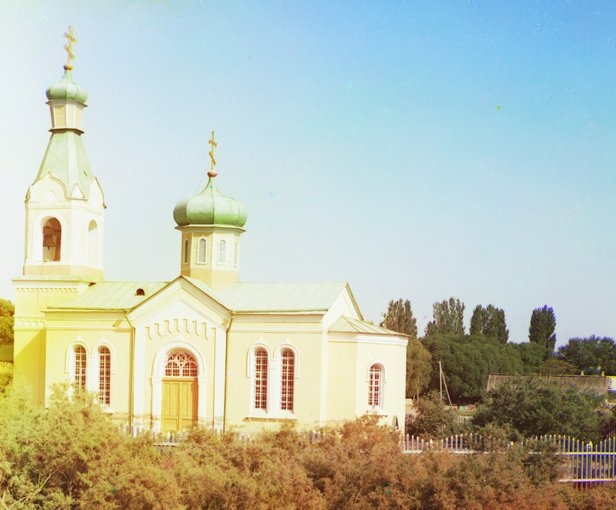
Orthodox Church.Sabirabad (Petropavlovka)

But later, the idea of rebuilding the city was abandoned. In 1887, when Ukrainian villagers were transferred to Mughan, 26 families were settled in this settlement and the village was called Petropavlovsk. There were 87 farms here in 1901. At the end of the 19th century, the village of Petropavlovka was built in the territory of the present city. In 1887, the Ukrainians began to move here.

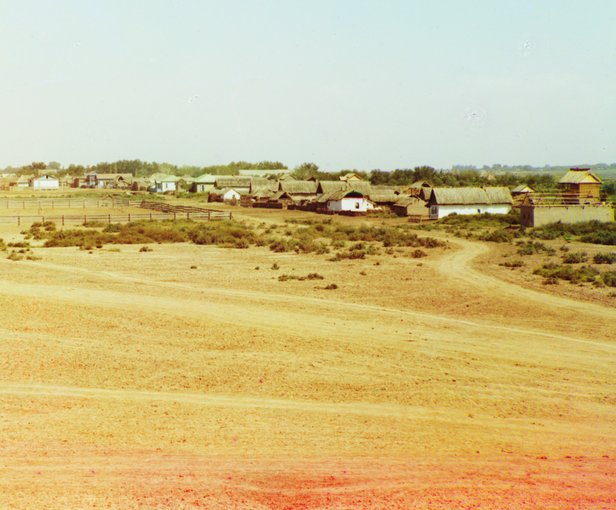
Sabirabad (Petropavlovka) .General view. Kura river from northwest.

The village began to develop in the early 20th century. On August 8, 1930, Petropavlovsk became the center of the district. On October 2, 1931, Sabirabad was renamed. In 1952, the settlement took its status as a city on December 4, 1959.

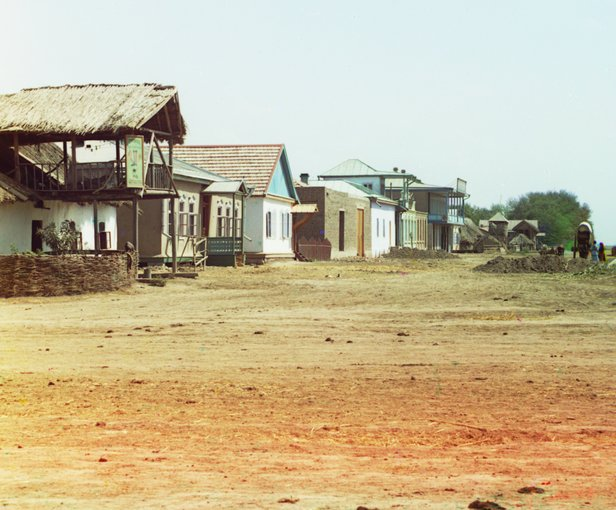
Sabirabad (Petropavlovka)

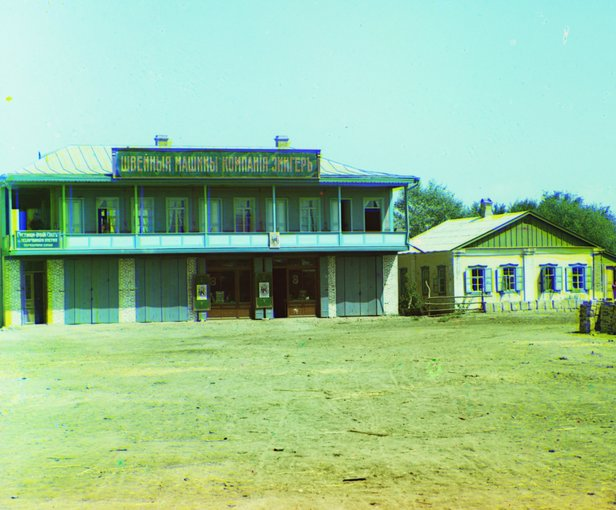
The shop of "Singer" tailor company is on the top floor. The furniture store is on the left from the floor.

After the second half of the 19th century, the Tsar of Russia sent noble two brothers, Peter and Paul to give them instructions to cultivate cotton here. They lay the basis of a shipyard and shipyard in the present-day Sabirabad city, at the intersection of the cotton plant and the current Heydar Hamidov street and Vidadi street, behind the secondary school named after S. Vurgun on near the junction of Kura Araz, near Javad, Galagain and Kurkandi villages. At that time, the Araz River was in the vicinity of the Kura River. When Pyotr and Pavel produced cotton at the factory, they were going to take the Kura river to the Caspian Sea and then to the Volga River and Russian cities through the ships. Cotton should be harvested in nearby villages. In this way, by giving cotton seeds and other means to nearby villages, they were encouraged to plant cotton and to sign a contract for the purchase of the product.

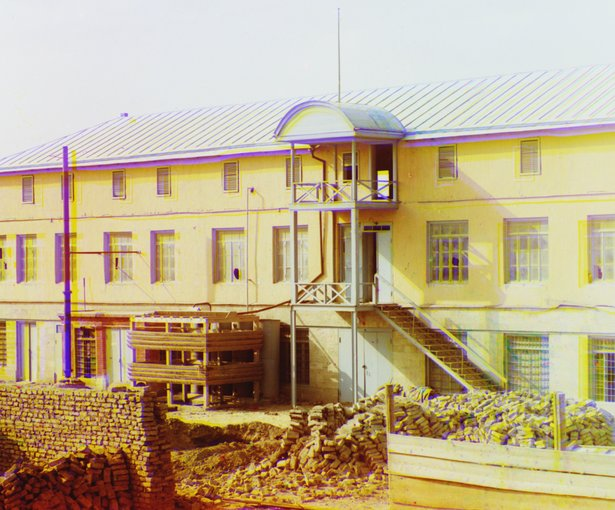
Samedov Cotton plant.

Many professionals and other workers from Russia are brought here with their families to work at the plant and shipyard. Homes, including hospitals, clubs, and other public buildings are also being built in the area of the plant and port for their survival. Thus, in the territory of present Sabirabad one Russian village is formed. Despite the distortion of the facts, the logic of the Russian empire's policy is so appropriate. After the Turkmenchay treaty of 1828, the Russian Empire completed its occupation policy in the South Caucasus. The southern borders of the empire were known after agreeing with the Iranian kingdom.However, because of the lack of confidence in the protection of these borders, it was entrusted to the people who were deported from Russia and Ukraine. From the Nakhchivan to Astara, Russian villages were built along the entire border. In the territory of Sabirabad, Krasnoselsk (Kara Nuru), Pokrovka (Garatapa), Novodon (Navadan), Aleksandrovka (Shahriyar), Vladimirovka (Nizamikend), Khersonovka (Nasimikend) and other villages were built. The present Sabir canal was also drawn to the Araz River in order to grow crops and meet other water requirements in these villages. Newly populated Russian villages were also located around this canal. In order to undermine the idea of the local community, it was alleged that those who were moved here were expelled from their homeland. In fact, the climate of this place was favorable for their homeland to live. In Siberia, Tyga, and other places in Russia for the exile, it is inexhaustible. It was part of the osvivatization (to own) policy. The local population began to move here from neighboring villages and districts. After the earthquake in Shamakhi in the early twentieth century, a flow of Shamakhi people began and they constructed "Shamakhililar" neighborhood, cemetery and mosque here.

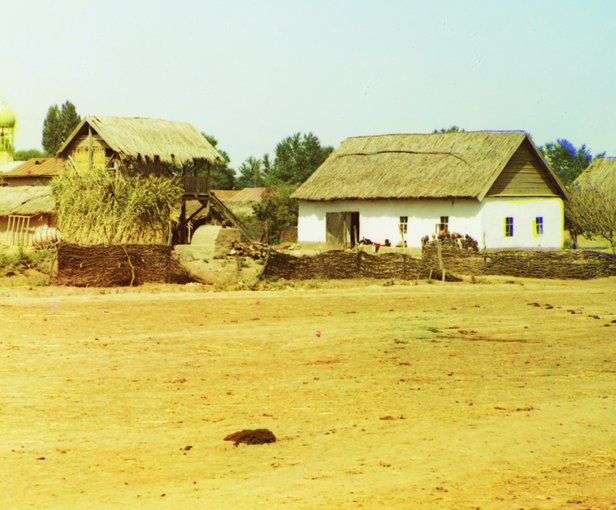
Sabirabad (Petropavlovka). mosque on back.

After the revolutionary movements in Iran were deposited, the Iranians immigrated here and settled here in the "hamshary" neighborhood.From western Azerbaijan, those who were deported by Stalin's orders were brought here.Meskhetian Turks also sheltered here.Thus, the population of Sabirabad was formed. After the Tsar empire was replaced by the Soviet Empire, Lenin's attitude towards Azerbaijan was different from that of the previous Tsar. It is said that, after Lenin's coming to power, he did not recognize all the Tsar's treaties apart from the Turkmenchay Treaty. Even Stalin remained loyal to this treaty, and in 1945 Soviet troops were in Tehran, but did not merge Iranian Azerbaijan into the USSR. However, the purpose of the USSR was to capture the lands of neighboring countries in the name of spreading socialism worldwide. South Belarus, Western Ukraine, Bessarabia, Pribaltika were united into the USSR but Iranian Azerbaijan was not merged.

There was also a need for a factory to transform the raw cotton. The Tsar government entrusts this work to the Vagen brothers. They, in turn, invite experts from Germany to build a plant and put into operation in 1906.

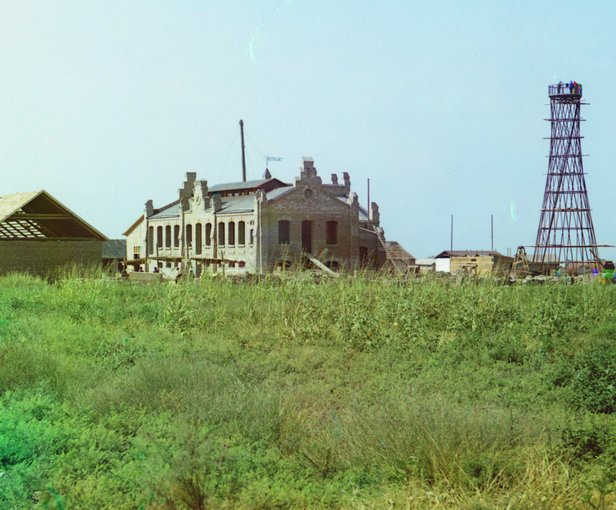
Sabiravad (Petropavlovka). Construction of the Bogau Cotton Mill.

Each year, the Kura and Araz rivers flooded the city, causing great damage to the surrounding villages. Thus, the USSR government made a decision to establish a brigade of only two units in the country. Then, as the technique increased, auto stations and tractor repair stations were also created. There were Russian neighborhoods around these offices. These neighborhoods, the surrounding area of the bus station, were called osvoenni.

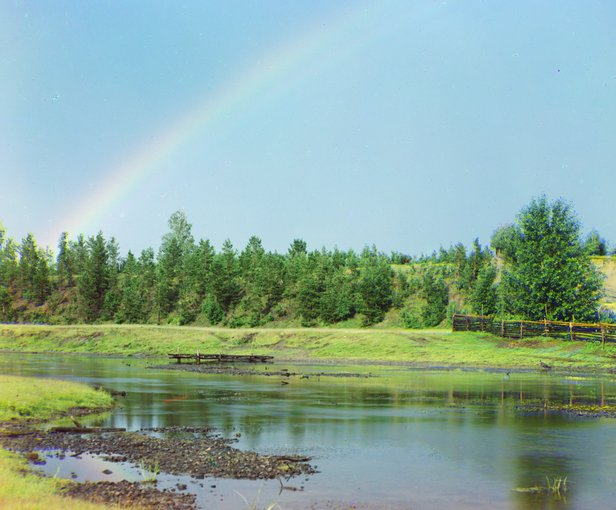
Navigable Stretch of the Kura River at Petropavlovka. A Dock. Mugan Steppe.

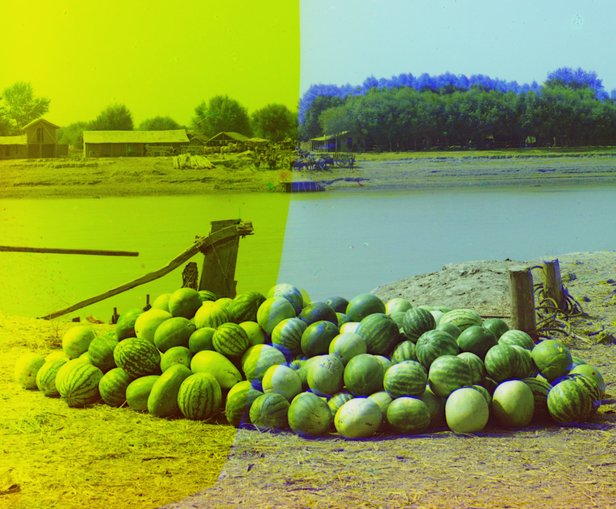
Watermelons. An Import along the Kura River in Petropavlovka. Mugan Steppe.

== Geography ==
Anthropogenic sediments are spread. The climate is related to the mild-warm semi-desert and dry desert climate. Basically, gray-grass soils are spread. The semi-desert plant prevails in the area. There is also a desert plant in some areas. It is found in saline soils in desert plants. In saline semidescopes often occurs on halophytes: black-brown, cherry orange. They form tuberous hills. Here, also, the Khazar shakhsevdisi, the cabbage rhinoceros, the caterpillar, as well as the one-year rugs - the salty bull and so on. plants are encountered. In the semi-desert group, wormwood, marginal and ephemeral semideserts are widely used in the region. Large areas of the Yovshan semi-arid zone are used under cotton and grain crops.

== Population ==
By January 1, 2018, the population of Sabirabad is 30,612 people.

== Culture ==
The architectural monument, known as Old Hamam, is located on Fizuli Street, 27. The building was built in 1901. At present, it is protected as a historical architectural monument and needs major repairs. The monument known as "Shamakhi Mosque" was built in 1903 by residents of Shamakhi who moved to Sabirabad after the earthquake in Shamakhi.

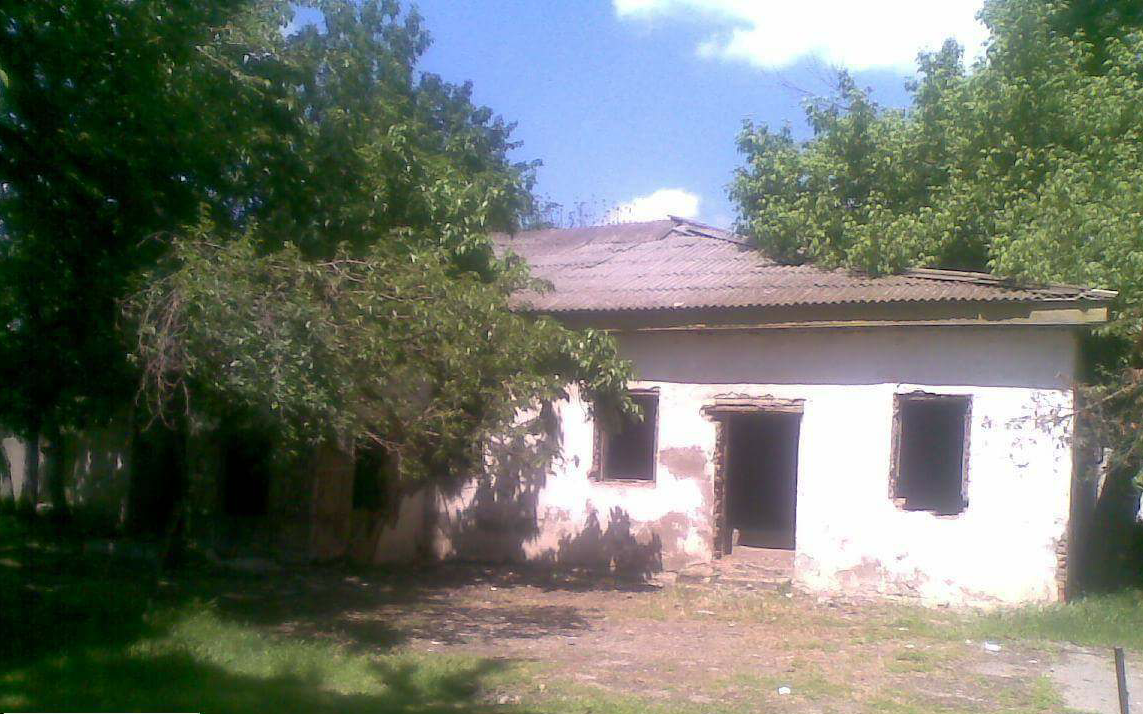
The bathhouse built in 1901

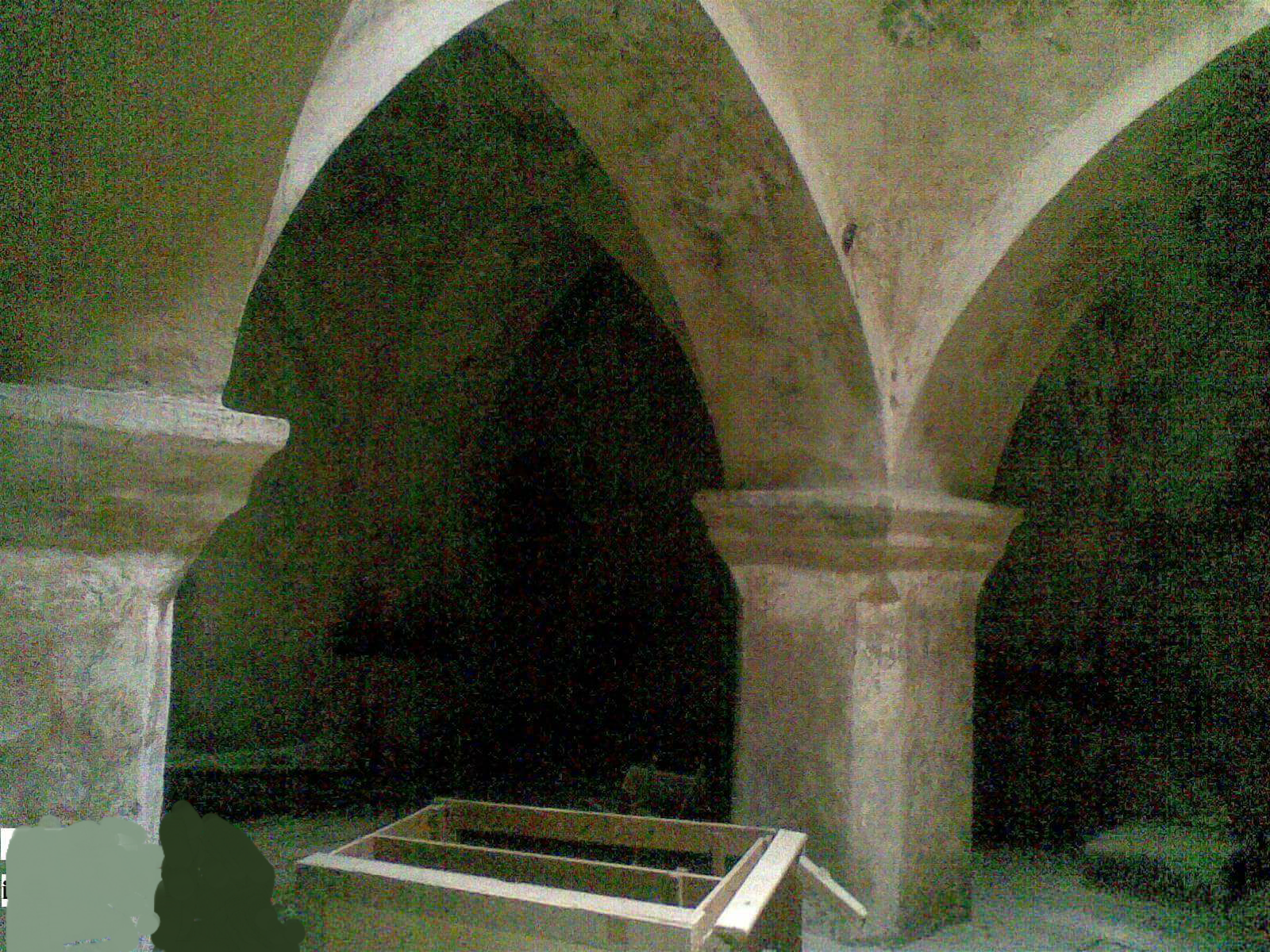
The inside of my bathroom.

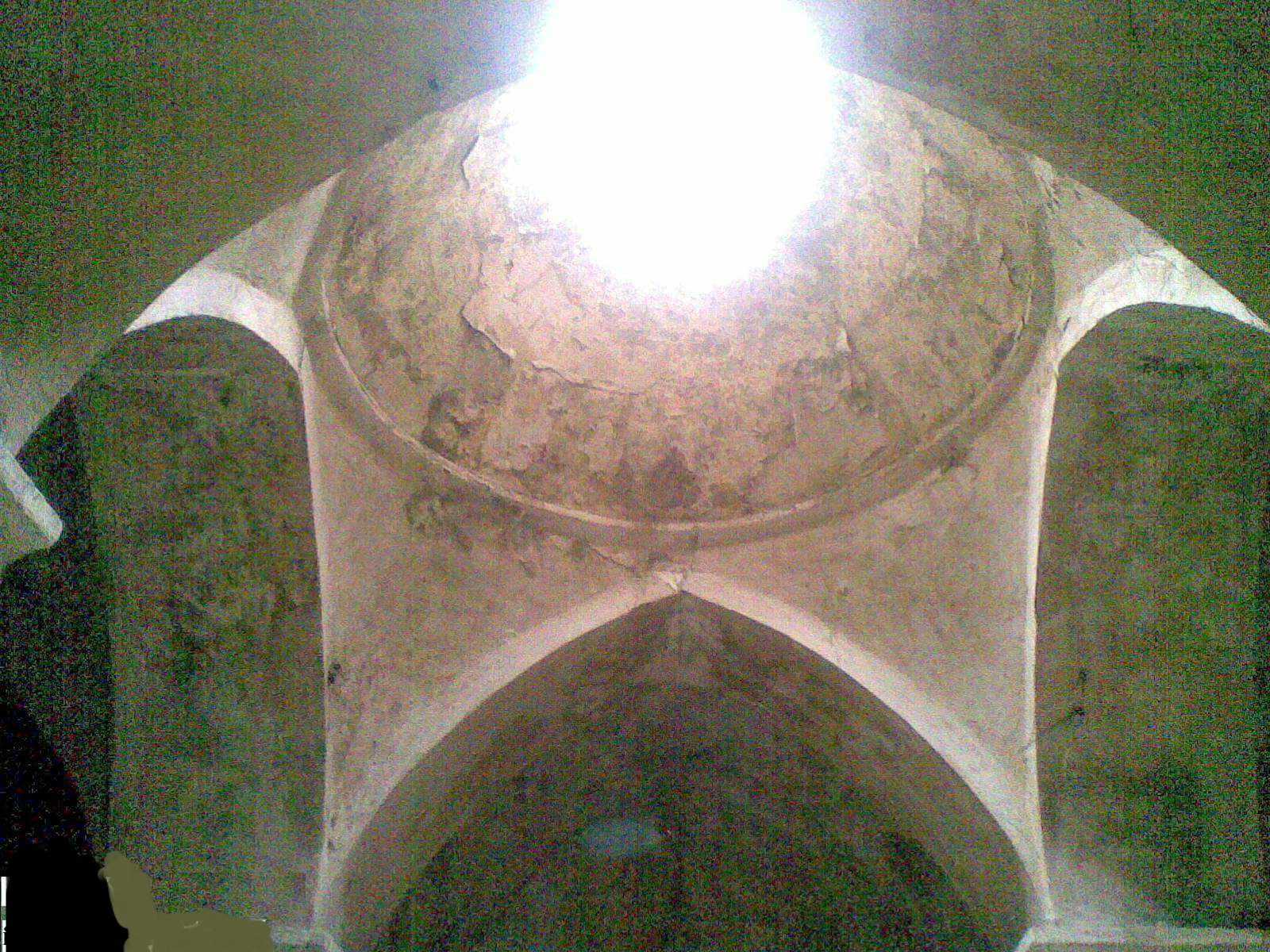
Bath-house interior view.

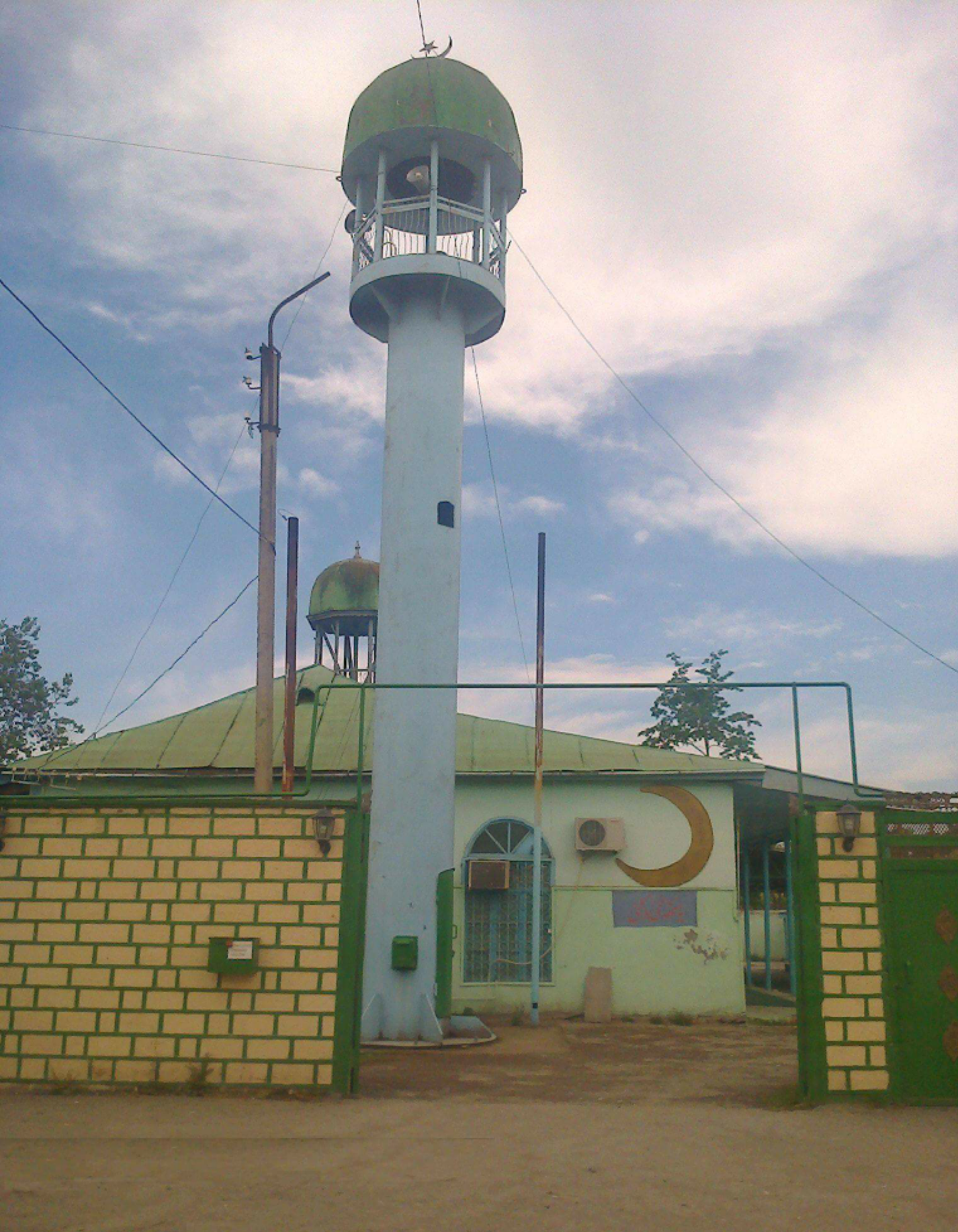
Shamakhi mosque, built in 1903

== Education ==
The number of secondary schools is 8, the total number of secondary schools is 8, and the number of secondary schools is 1.

=== State Social and Economic College ===
Sabirabad State Social and Economic College was established on the basis of Sabirabad Agricultural Technical School in accordance with the decision of the Cabinet of Ministers to improve the secondary vocational education network. There are 40 pedagogical workers in the college. The total number of employees is 93 people. At present 570 students study at the college on the following specialities:

- physical education
- vocational training
- organization of road traffic
- veterinary
- accounting
- financial business
- banking
- family and home education
- organization of municipalities
- archive business and clerical work
- library and information support

=== Sabirabad Vocational High School ===
Sabirabad Vocational High School was established in 1974 as a secondary vocational school, and in 1996 it was granted a high school status. Lisey is located in a 7-hectare area, has 1 study and 2 dormitories. 240 students study at the school. There are 8 speciality groups:

- tractor-machinist, repairer-fitter
- fitter for repairing agricultural machinery and equipment
- tractor-reconditioner, repairer-fitter
- Technique for artificial insemination on animals
- hand power welders
- computer master
- cotton grower

38 students, including 24 teachers and 14 production trainers, are engaged in the training and retraining of pupils.

19 vocational cabinets were established at Vocational High School.

== Sport ==
The Sabirabad District Youth and Sports Department have been operating since 1994. Since its inception, the management has united around all sports organizations. Sabirabad Olympic Sports Complex was commissioned in 2008 on the initiative of President Ilham Aliyev. The commissioning of the Sabirabad OSC has made a great contribution to the development of the Sabirabad district. At present, Sabirabad Olympic Sports Complex is training freestyle wrestling, boxing, mini football, karate, simulator, ping-pong, swimming and athletics. Information on the activities of the Sabirabad District Youth and Sports Office can be obtained from the official website of the department.

=== Football ===
Currently, a football pitch with artificial coating has been built in the district. The construction of the second artificial paved area has been started. The children's football team is in the age group of three. The Futsal team is playing in the national championship.

=== Wrestling ===
There is an interest in this kind of sport. Currently, about 500 adolescents and young people are engaged in freestyle wrestling. The wrestlers are the national champions Seyfulla Mehdiyev, Vugar Kerimov, Shahin Abbasov. Sabirabad RCS "KCIC's UGIM, the District Education Department's UGIM is engaged.

=== Boxing ===
Boxing Sport has been created for two years. This kind of sports deals with about 50 teenagers and young people.

=== Karate ===
Karate players have won various competitions, participating in republican championships.

=== Athletics ===
Athletics is more popular in secondary schools. Rufat Mehdiyev is the national champion of this kind of sport.

Table tennis and swimming in our district.

== Gallery ==
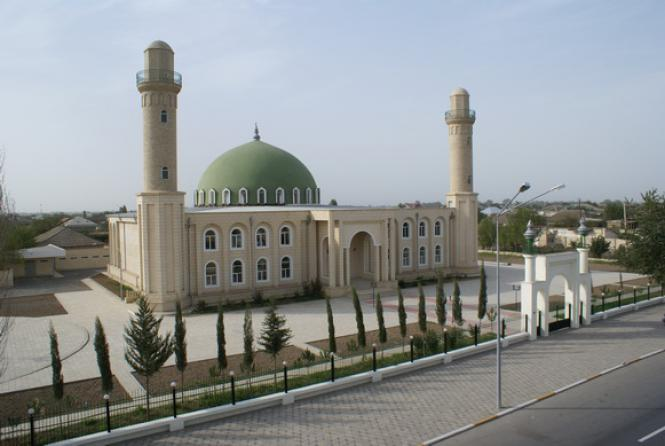
Heydar mosque.

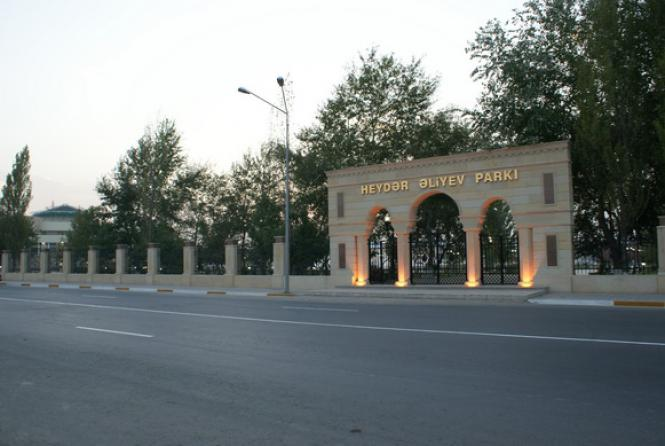
Park

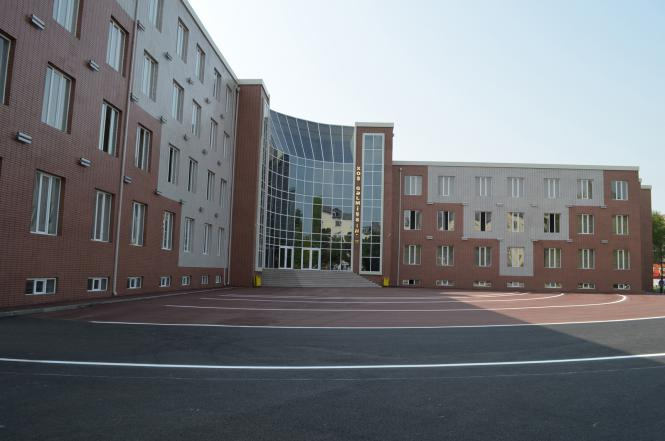
The city school named after great poet Mirza Alakbar Sabir.

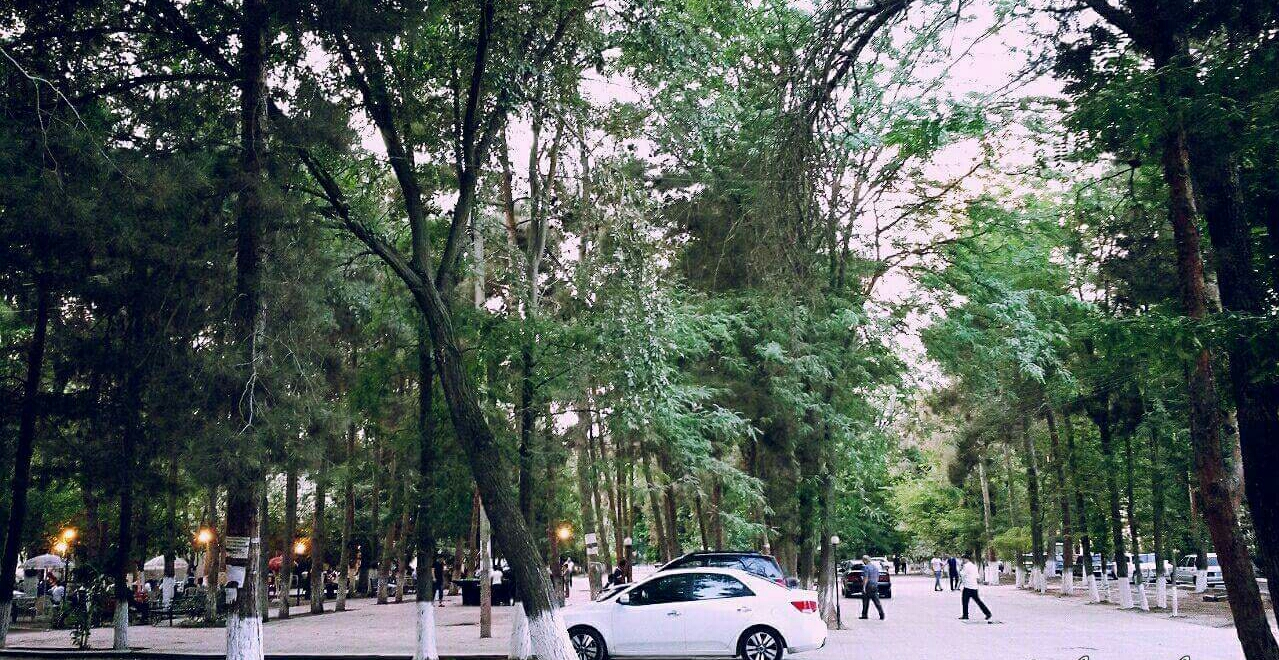
Sabirabad. The garden on behalf of Sabir.

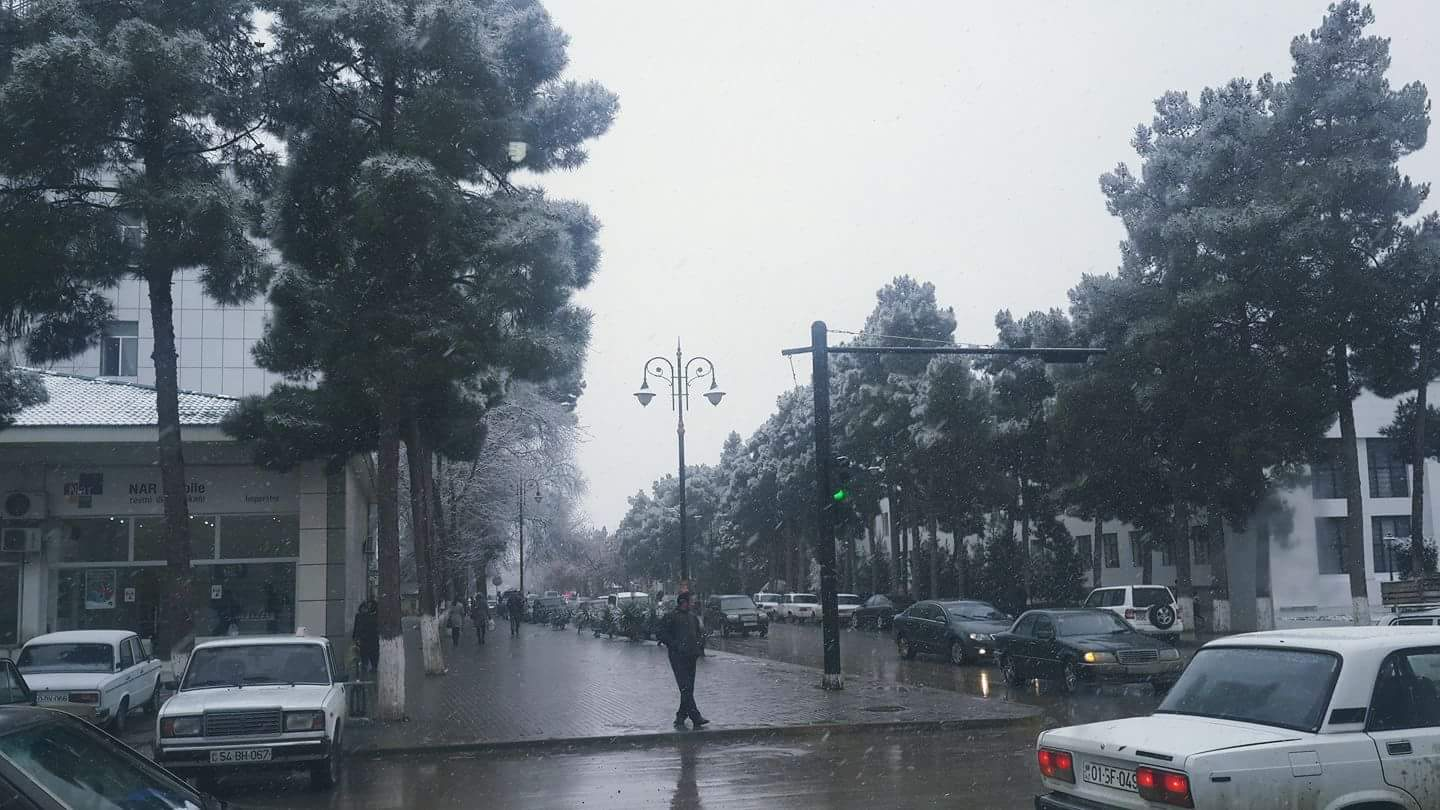
Sabirabad city. Road to traditional market.

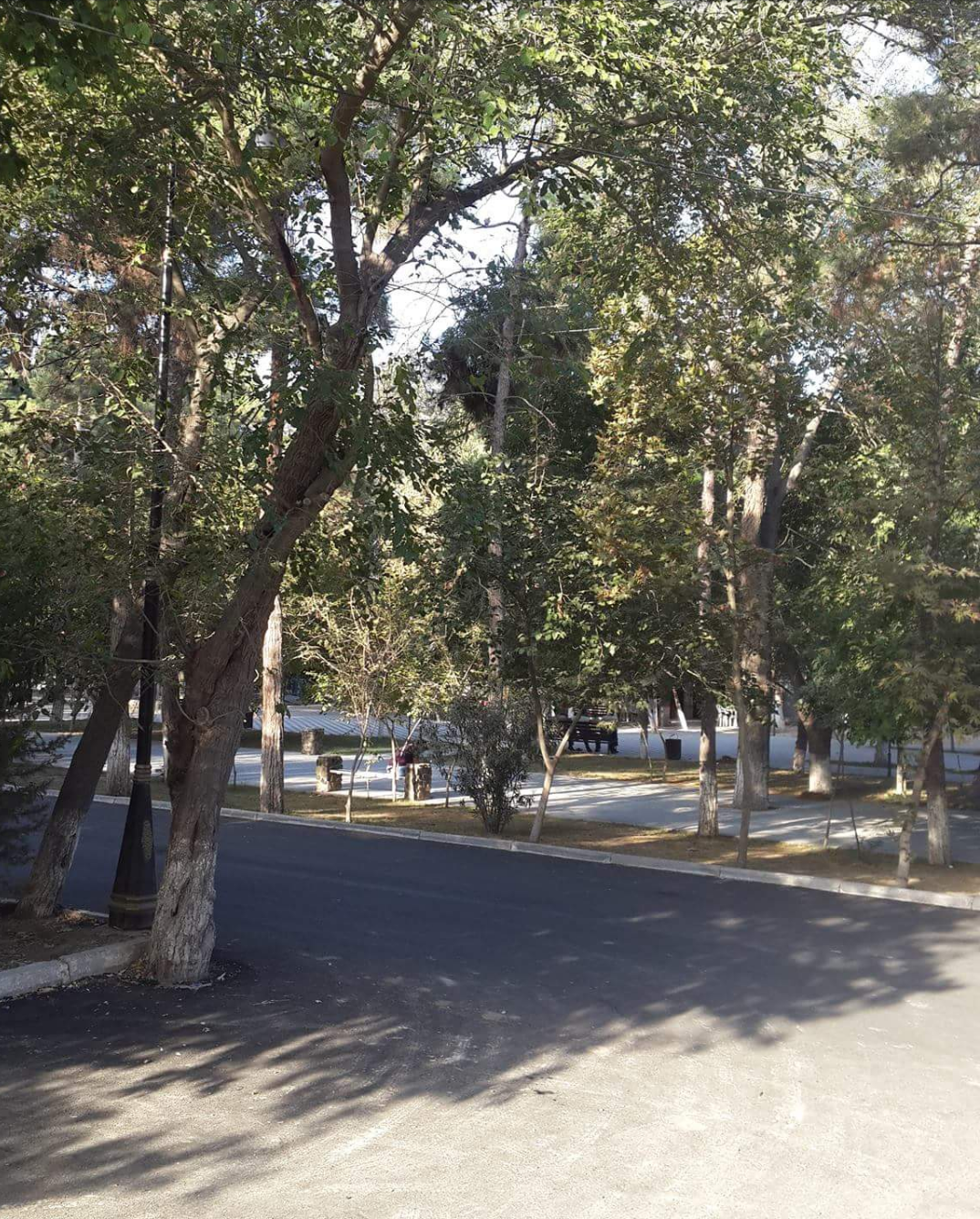
The garden on behalf of Sabir.

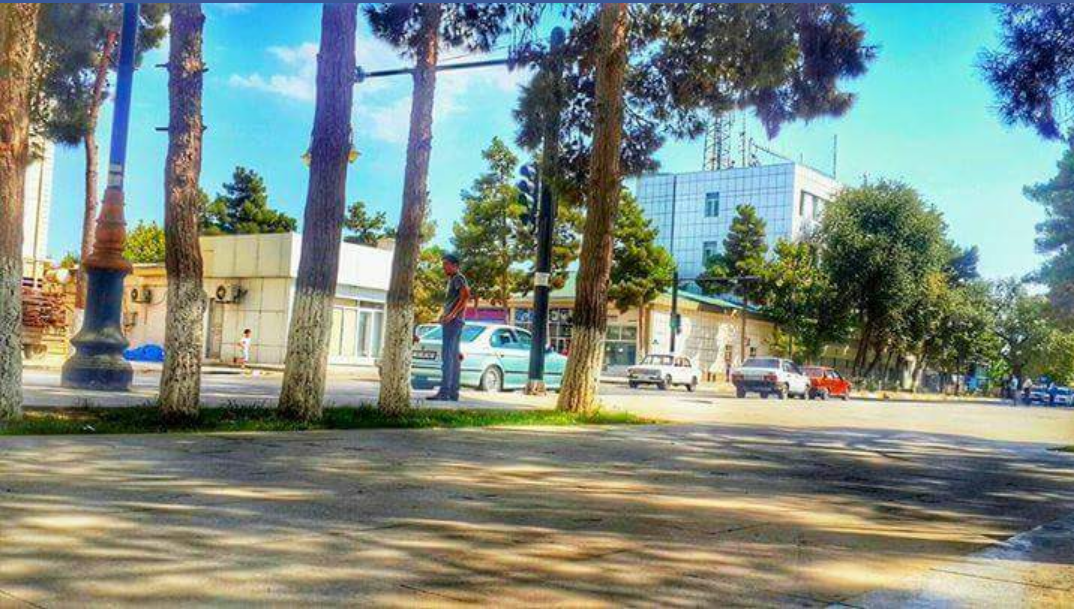
Post Office and Communication junction.

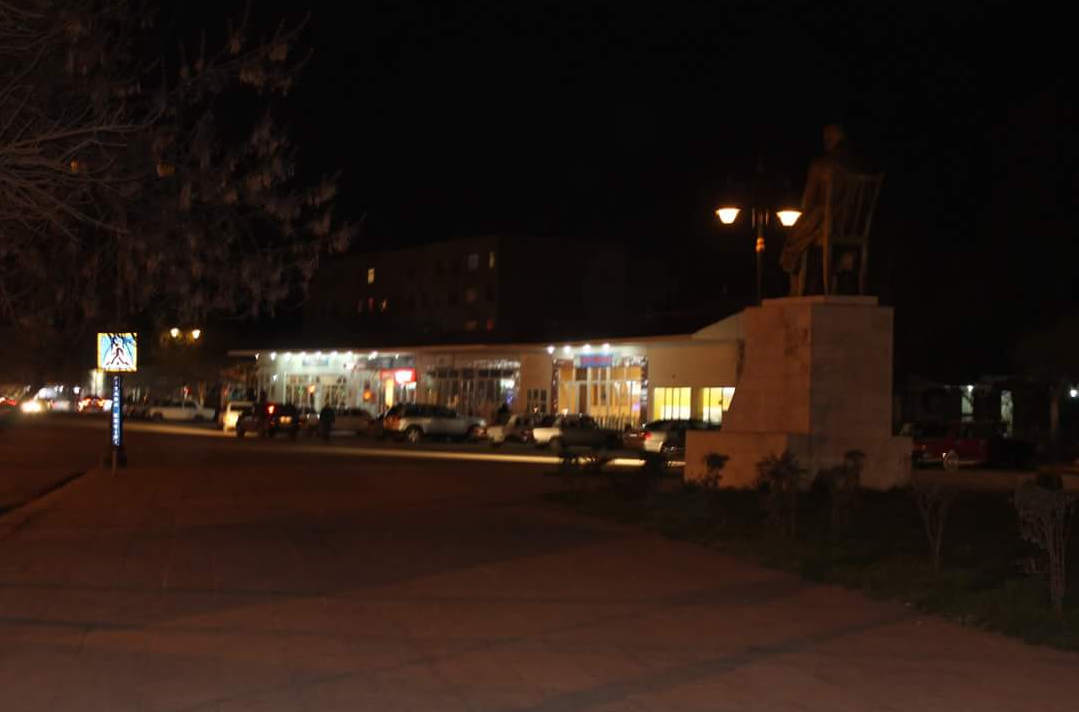
Sabirabad nights

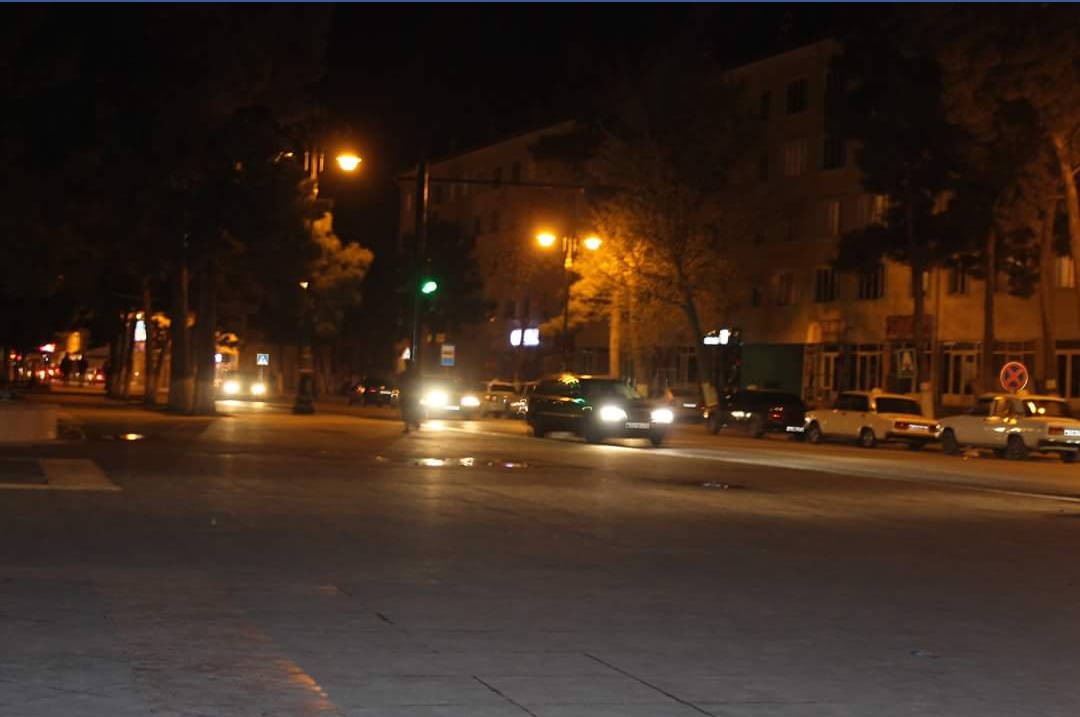
Nighttime

Youth Center and Club in Sabirabad city

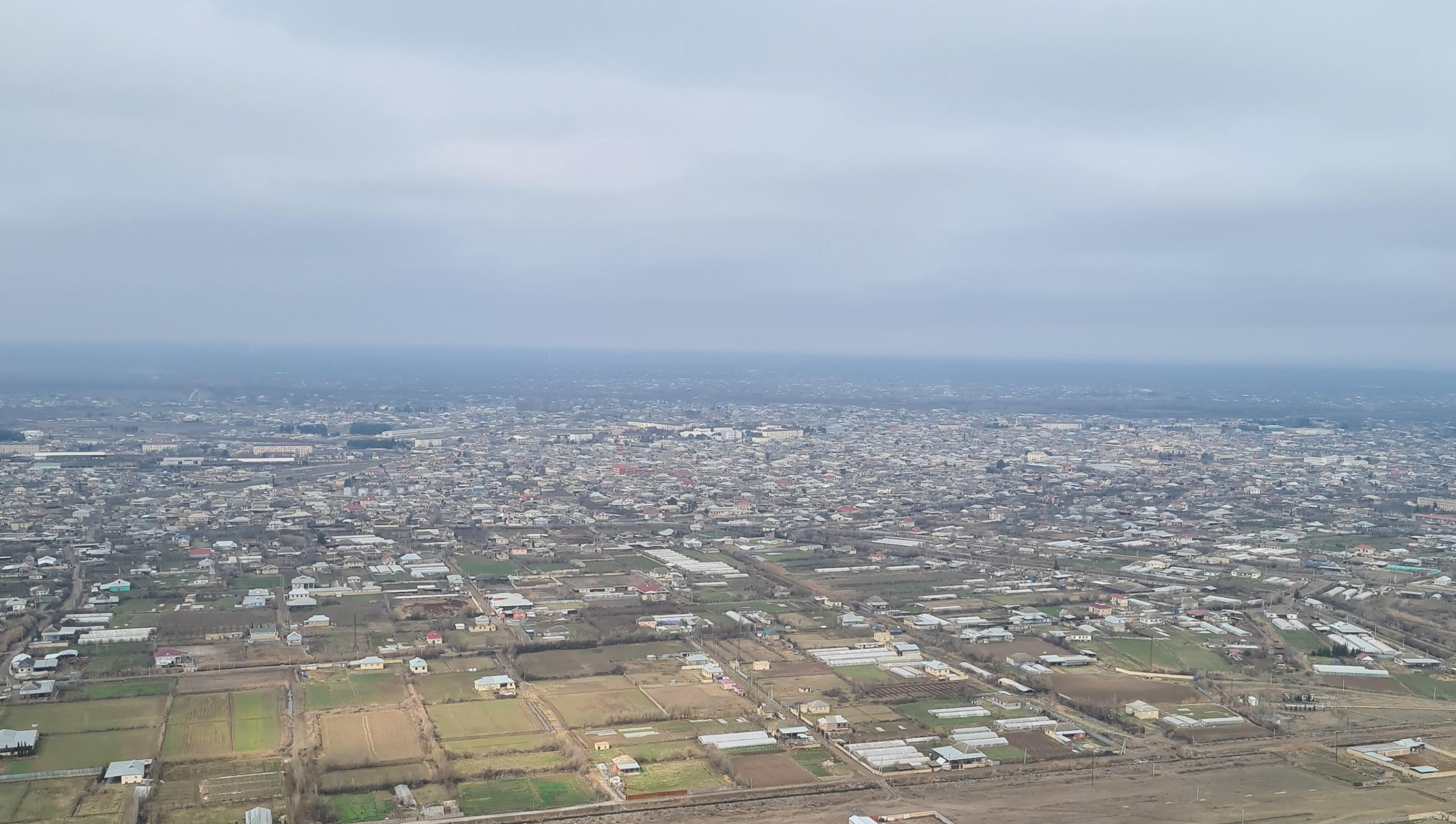
Aerial view of Sabirabad

== Notable natives ==
- Lutfiyar Imanov — Azerbaijani Soviet singer (dramatic tenor), People's Artist of USSR (1977).
- Elvin Aliyev - football player.

== See also ==
- İnşaatçı Sabirabad FK
- Sabirabad District
- Qalağayın
- Javad Khanate
- Djevatskoye Uyezd

== Sources ==
- Əliyarlı, S. (1996), Azərbaycan tarixi [History of Azerbaijan] (in Azerbaijani), Baku: Azərbaycan
- A. P. Berje, ed. (1868), Acts of the Caucasian Archeographic Commission (АКАК), vol. II, 69 document 455, Tiflis: Main Office of the Governor of the Caucasus
