= Cavad =

- Municipality
- Location within Azerbaijan
- Coordinates: 40°02′32″N 48°28′15″E
- Country: Azerbaijan
- Rayon: Sabirabad

Population
  - Total: 3,151
- Time zone: UTC+4 (AZT)
  - Summer (DST): UTC+5 (AZT)

Cavad (also, Dzhavad and Dzhavat) is a village and municipality in the Sabirabad Rayon of Azerbaijan. It has a population of 3,151. It takes its name from the short lived Javad Khanate.
