= List of castles and fortresses in Azerbaijan =

This is a list of castles and fortresses in Azerbaijan. There are many castles in Azerbaijan which were built in ancient and medieval times. Thus the names of some castles have "qala", "divar" or "qüllə" suffixes.

== Karabakh Region ==
| No. | Name | City | Year | Founder and Era | Picture |
|---|---|---|---|---|---|
| 1 | Garakopaktapa | Fuzuli District | 3rd millennium BC | Eneolithic Age | |
| 2 | Askeran fortress | Khankendi | 1751 | Melik Shahnazar II/Panah Ali Khan | |
| 3 | Kachag Castle | Khankendi | 9th century | Principality of Khachen | |
| 4 | Shahbulag Castle | Aghdam | 1752 | Karabakh Khanate | |
| 5 | Shusha fortress | Shusha | 1751 | Melikdoms of Artsakh/Karabakh Khanate | |
| 6 | Koroghlu Fortress | Gedebey | 16th century | Safavid Empire | |
| 7 | Maiden Tower | Gedebey | 9th century | Bagratid Armenia | |
| 8 | Andorab Castle | Tartar | 8th century | Bagratid Armenia | |
| 9 | Izz Castle | Tartar | 7th century | Arminiya | |
| 10 | Gulistan Castle | Goranboy | 5th century | Kingdom of Armenia | |
| 11 | Lex Castle | Kalbajar | 1140s | Kingdom of Artsakh | |
| 12 | Shalat Castle | Goranboy | 4th century | Kingdom of Armenia | |
| 13 | Chilgigala Castle | Lachin | 10th century | Bagratid Armenia | |
| 14 | Bayat Castle | Tartar | 1748 | Karabakh Khanate | |
| 15 | Baylakan Castle | Beylagan District | 5th century | Kingdom of Armenia | |
| 16 | Barda Castle | Berde | 1122 | Kingdom Of Artsakh | |
| 17 | Maiden Tower | Jabrail | 12th century | Shaddadids | |
| 18 | Jomard Castle | Kalbajar | 6th century BC | Orontid Armenia | |
| 19 | Kalaboynu Castle | Kalbajar | 4th century BC | Kingdom of Armenia | |
| 20 | Ktish Castle | Khojavend | 5th century BC | Orontid Armenia | |
| 21 | Kerki Castle | Khankendi | 4th century BC | Orontid Armenia | |
| 22 | Khan Castle | Khankendi | 2nd century | Kingdom of Armenia | |
| 23 | Shahid Castle | Agjabedi | 1918 | Democratic Republic of Azerbaijan | |

== Absheron Region ==
| No. | Name | City | Year | Founder and Era | Picture |
|---|---|---|---|---|---|
| 1 | Baku fortress | Icheri Sheher | 12th century | Shirvanshahs | |
| 2 | Quadrangular Castle | Mərdəkan (Baku) | 12th century | Akhsitan I ibn Minuchihr III | |
| 3 | Nardaran Fortress | Baku | 1301 | Shirvanshahs | |
| 4 | Ramana Castle | Baku | 14th century | Shirvanshahs | |
| 5 | Round Castle | Sabunchu District | 1232 | Shirvanshahs | |
| 6 | Maiden Tower | Icheri Sheher | 9th century BC (The second time 12th century) | Shirvanshahs | |
| 7 | Bilgah Castle | Sabunçu, Baku | 14th century BC | Shirvanshahs | |
| 8 | Shagan Castle | Baku | 12th century | Shirvanshahs | |
| 9 | Shikh Castle | Baku | 1232 | Ilkhanake Empire | |
| 10 | Burjs of Pirallahi | Pirallahi Island | 1329 | Ilkhanate Empire | |

== Ganjabasar Region ==
| No. | Name | City | Year | Founder and Era | Picture |
|---|---|---|---|---|---|
| 1 | Ganja Fortress | Ganja | 16th century | Safavid Empire | |
| 2 | Askipara Monastery Castle | Gazakh | 5th century | Kingdom of Armenia | |
| 3 | Old Ganja Castle | Ganja | 10th century | Shaddadids | |
| 4 | Koroghlu Castle | Tovuz | 16th century | Safavid Empire | |
| 5 | Shamkir fortress | Shamkir | 17th century | Safavid Empire | |
| 6 | Hunan Castle | Tovuz | 8th century | Bagratid Armenia | |
| 7 | Didivan Castle | Gazakh | 6th century | Kingdom of Armenia | |
| 8 | Zurnabad Castle | Goygol | 13th century | Ilkhanate Empire | |

== Shaki-Zaqatala Region ==
| No. | Name | City | Year | Founder and Era | Picture |
|---|---|---|---|---|---|
| 1 | Sumug Castle | İlisu | 18th century | Elisu Sultanate | |
| 2 | Shamilgala (Galacha) | Gakh | 1850s | Zakatal Okrug | |
| 3 | Shaki fortress | Shaki | 15th century | Shirvanshahs | |
| 4 | Gelersen-Görersen fortress | Shaki | 8th century | Shirvanshahs | |
| 5 | Jinli Castle | Ağçay | 8th century | Caucasian Albania | |
| 6 | Fairy Castle (Parigala) | Zagatala | 3rd century | Caucasian Albania | |
| 7 | Kabalaka | Gabala | 1st century BC | Caucasian Albania | |
| 8 | Aydinbulag Castle | Sheki | 9th century | Sheki Kingdom | |
| 9 | Hazrat Ali Castle | Shaki | 8th century | Arab Caliphate | |
| 10 | Nukha Castle | Sheki | 18th century | Mahammadhuseyn Khan/Shaki Khanate | |
| 11 | Elisu Castle | Gakh | 1840s | Elisu Sultanate | |
| 12 | Chingis Castle | Gakh | 15th century | Safavid Empire | |
| 13 | Icheri Bazar Castle | Gakh | 1710s | Safavid Empire | |
| 14 | Hasan Khan Castle | Gakh | 1860s | Zakatal Okrug | |
| 15 | City Castle | Sheki | 3rd century BC | Caucasian Albania | |
| 16 | Zagatala Castle | Zagatala | 1830 | Zakatal Okrug | |
| 17 | Oguz Castle | Oguz | 7th century BC | Median Empire | |
| 18 | Girls Castle | Gabala | 820s | Salarids | |
| 19 | Surkhay Khan Castle | Oguz | 18th century | Elisu Sultanate | |
| 20 | Bum Castle | Gabala | 5th century | Caucasian Albania | |
| 21 | Vandam Castle | Gabala | 5th century | Caucasian Albania | |
| 22 | Malug Castle | Oguz | 9th century | Shaki Kingdom | |
| 23 | Saray Castle | Sheki | 1750s | Shaki Khanate | |

== Castles in Janub (South) Region ==
| No. | Name | City | Year | Founder and Era | Picture |
|---|---|---|---|---|---|
| 1 | Kynon Castle | Lankaran | 8th century | Khurramites | |
| 2 | Balabyur Castle | Lankaran | 7th century | Caucasian Albania | |
| 3 | Shindan Castle | Astara | 7th century | Caucasian Albania | |
| 4 | Lankaran Castle | Lankaran | 1726 | Safavid Empire | |
| 5 | Zindan Fortress | Lankaran | 1747 | Afshar Empire | |
| 6 | Chay Castle | Masally | Khurramites | 810s | |

== Shimal (North) Region ==
| No. | Name | City | Year | Founder and Era | Picture |
|---|---|---|---|---|---|
| 1 | Chirag Gala | Shabran District | 4th century | Caucasian Albania | |
| 2 | Shabran Castle | Shabran | 1st century BC | Massagetae | |
| 3 | Turan Castle | Kusar | 7th century | Caucasian Albania | |
| 4 | Anig Castle | Kusar | 9th century | Emirate of Darband | |
| 5 | Khoja Castle | Khachmaz | 12th century | Seljuk Empire | |

== Aran Region ==
| No. | Name | City | Year | Founder and Era | Picture |
|---|---|---|---|---|---|
| 1 | Baghravan Castle-City | Unknown | 2nd millennium BC | Kura–Araxes culture | |
| 2 | Ultan Castle | Sabirabad | 4th century | Caucasian Albania | |
| 3 | Surkhay Castle | Agdash | 17th century | Arash Sultanate | |
| 4 | Seljuk Castle | Bilasuvar | 11th century | Seljuk Empire | |
| 5 | Galagayin Castle | Sabirabad | 13th century | Ilkhanate | |
| 6 | Bayramkoha Castle | Goychay | 3rd century | Caucasian Albania | |
| 7 | Safavid Castle | Shirvan | 1512 | Safavid Empire | |
| 8 | Su (Water) Castle | Yevlakh | 18th century | Arash Sultanate | |

== Shirvan Region ==
| No. | Name | City | Year | Founder and Era | Picture |
|---|---|---|---|---|---|
| 1 | Shamakhi Fortress | Shamakhi | 1045 | Shirvanshahs | |
| 2 | Javanshir Fortress | Ismailli | 640s | Caucasian Albania | |
| 3 | Niyal Castle | Ismailli | 3rd century | Caucasian Albania | |
| 4 | Kala-Bugurt | Shamakhi | 14th century | Shirvanshahs | |
| 5 | Bashkal Castle | Ismailli | 13th century BC | Shirvanshahs | |
| 6 | Gulustan Castle | Shamakhi | 9th century | Sajid dynasty | |
| 7 | Maiden Castle | Ismailli | 7th century | Caucasian Albania | |
| 8 | Khan Castle | Ismailli | 17th century | Safavid Empire | |
| 9 | Haram Castle | Agsu | 16th century | Safavid Empire | |
| 10 | Kasim Han Castle | Ismailli | 17th century | Safavid Empire | |
| 11 | Fit Castle | Agsu | 18th century | Afshar Empire | |
| 12 | Spring Castle | Agsu | 1741 | Afshar Empire | |

== Nakhchivan Autonomous Republic ==
| No. | Name | City | Year | Founder and Era | Picture |
|---|---|---|---|---|---|
| 1 | Chalkhankala Fortress | Kangarli | 3rd millennium BC | Aratta/Bronze Age | |
| 2 | Sadarak Castle | Sadarak | Turukkis/15th century BC | Bronze Age | |
| 3 | Gazanchi Castle | Julfa | 2nd millennium BC | Lullubi Kingdom/Bronze Age | |
| 4 | Oglan Castle | Sharur | 2nd millennium BC | Bronze Age | |
| 5 | Gavur Castle | Nakhchivan | 2nd millennium BC | Kura–Araxes culture | |
| 6 | Abbasabad (fortress) | Babek District | 1810 | Nakhichevan Khanate | |
| 7 | Jugha Castle | Shahbuz | 11th century | Bagratid Armenia | |
| 8 | Karasu Castle | Sharur | 2nd millennium BC | Bronze Age | |
| 9 | Yezidabad Castle | Nakhchivan | 640s | Sasanian Empire | |
| 10 | Shapur Castle | Shahbuz | 1st century | Kingdom of Armenia | |
| 11 | Alinja Tower | Julfa | 1140s | Kingdom of Syunik | |
| 12 | Ordubad Castle | Ordubad | 104 | Kingdom of Armenia | |
| 13 | Duylun Castle | Babek District | 6th century BC | Median Empire | |
| 14 | Nahajir Castle | Julfa | 2nd millennium BC | Shulaveri-Shomu culture | |
| 15 | Marzban Castle | Babek District | 9th century | Salarids | |
| 16 | Gul Kala | Sharur | 1140s | Eldiguzids | |
| 11 | Kharabagilan | Ordubad | 5th century | Kingdom of Armenia | |

== See also ==
- List of castles
