= Maiden Tower =

Maiden Tower may refer to:

- Maiden Tower (Baku), Azerbaijan
- Maiden Tower (Gadabay), Azerbaijan
- Maiden Tower (Ismayilli), Azerbaijan
- Maiden Tower (Jabrayil), Azerbaijan
- Maiden Tower (Szczecin), Poland
- Maiden Tower (ballet)
- Maiden's Tower, Istanbul, Turkey
