= Indie =

Indie is a short form of "independence" or "independent"; it may refer to:

== Arts, entertainment, and media ==
- Independent media, media free of influence by government or corporate interests
- Indie art, fine arts made by artists independent of commercial fine arts establishments
- Independent film, a film produced outside of the major film studios
  - Indiewood
- Indie game, video games created without financial backing from large companies
- Indie role-playing game, a role-playing game published outside of traditional, "mainstream" means
- Independent animation
- Indie comics, independently published comics
- Indie design, for handmade products by independent artisans
- Indie literature, a book published outside mainstream publishing
- Indie poster, or alternative poster, a poster created by a novice graphic designer
- Small press, or indie press, a book or magazine publisher whose publications appeal to small, niche audiences, and are typically not distributed widely

=== Music ===
- Independent music, subculture music that is independent of major producers
  - Indie dance, or alternative dance, a type of dance music rooted in indie rock and indie pop
  - Indie electronic, a music genre
  - Indie folk, a music genre that arose in the 1990s from singer/songwriters in the indie rock community influenced by folk and country music
  - Indie hip hop, hip hop music that primarily exists in the independent music scene
  - Indie music scene, localized indie music, listed by country
  - Indie pop, a genre of alternative pop music
  - Indie rock, a genre of alternative rock music
- Independent record label, operates without major corporate funding

== Sports ==
- Independent baseball league, a professional league in the U.S. and Canada not affiliated with Major League Baseball
- Independent circuit, or indie circuit, in professional wrestling, comprising smaller promotions that do not have national TV contracts

== Other uses ==
- Independent business (unique and not part of a chain or larger corporation).
- Independent soda, made by small, privately run companies
- Non-denominational church, or independent church, a church unaffiliated with a denominational organization

== See also ==
- Independent (disambiguation)
- Indi (disambiguation)
- Indies (disambiguation)
- Indy (disambiguation)
- List of independent radio stations
- The Independent (disambiguation)
