= Indies (disambiguation) =

The East Indies, or Indies for short, is used to describe the lands of South and Southeast Asia.

Indies may also refer to:

- Canadian Independent Music Awards, also known as the Indies, a Canadian award
- Indies Records, a Czech record label
- West Indies, the islands of North Atlantic Ocean and the Caribbean

== See also ==
- East Indies (disambiguation)
- West Indies (disambiguation)
- Indi (disambiguation)
- India (disambiguation)
- Indian (disambiguation)
- Indie (disambiguation)
- Indy (disambiguation)
