= Javad (fortress) =

Javad Fortress
- Azerbaijani: Cavad qala şəhəri
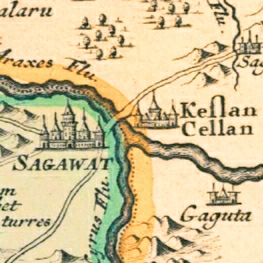
- A map of the Caspian Sea area made by Reiner Ottens (1698-1750), Jakob Keyser (1710-1745) by order of Peter I (1720). Javad and Galagayin ("Sagawat" and "Kellan") (forts)

- Location within Azerbaijan

General information
- Status: ruins have remained
- Type: Fortress
- Architectural style: Architectural school of Shirvan-Absheron
- Location: Javad, Sabirabad, Azerbaijan
- Coordinates: 40.0232°N 48.2815°E
- Completed: IX century

Javad was a medieval fortress city of Shirvan in Javad village of Sabirabad District located at the confluence of Kura and Aras. It was founded in the 9th century.

== Etymology ==
The name "Javad" is derived from the Arabic word "jawz" which means "crossing". Since the toponym is Arabic, it can be concluded that the city was founded in the 9th century during the Shirvanshahs state. The name of the city of Javad is mentioned in sources in the 16th century.

Javad (Tsawat). Author Adam Olearius (1599–1671). The map was drawn in the first quarter of the 18th century."

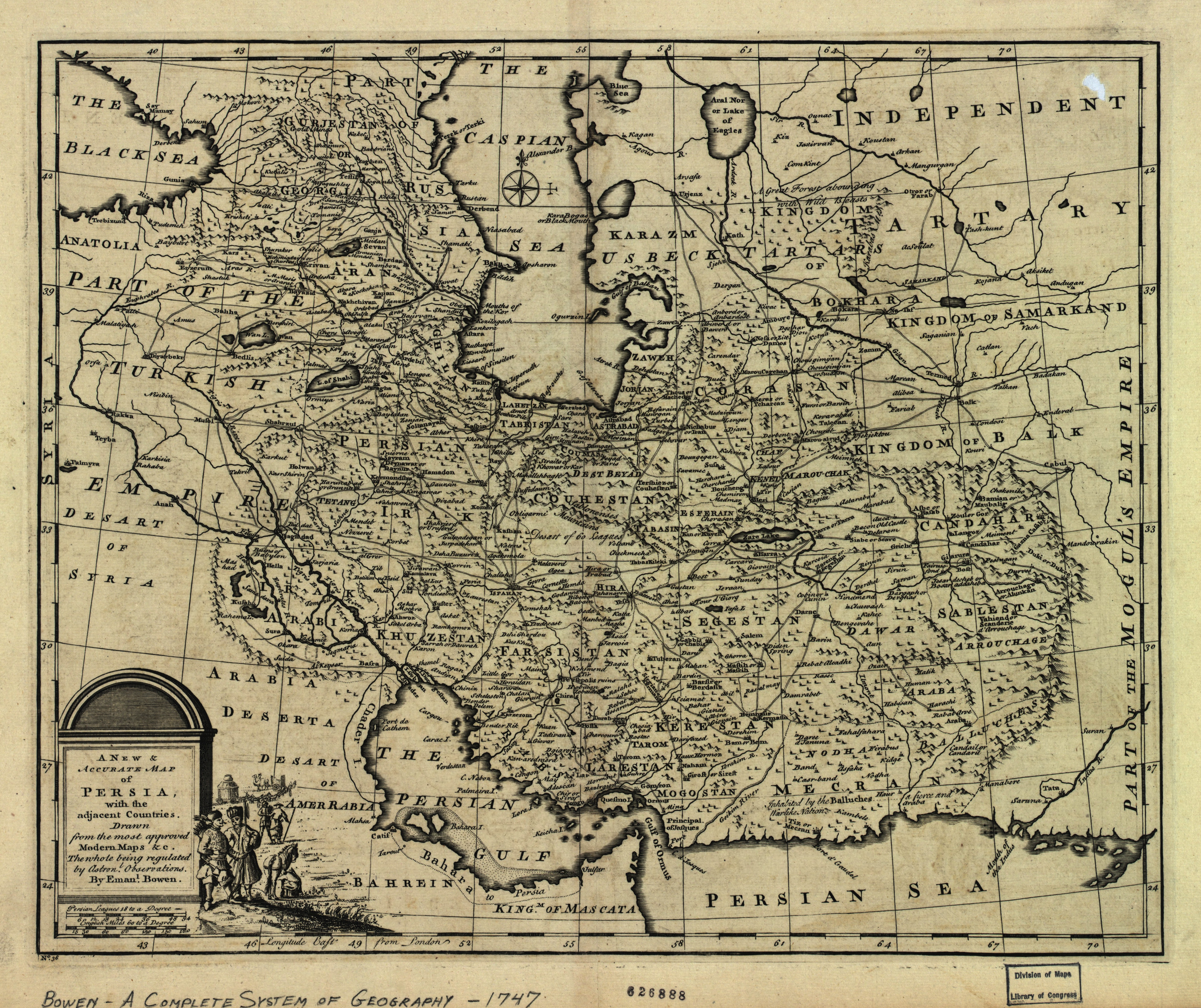
Jawat (Jawat). Map by Emanuel Bowen (1694–1767). The description dates back to 1747. The map was drawn up in 1750.

== History ==
Ancient Javad was considered one of the main points on the trade route between European and Eastern countries. A number of European and Russian travelers and diplomats including Englishman Anthony Jenkinson (October 6, 1561), Russians Artemi Sukhanov (1551-1552) and Fyodor Kotov (August, September 1623), German Adam Olearius (March 31, 1637). ), Dutchman Jan Janszoon Struys (1671-1672), and the Scotsman Bel (December 7, 1716) visited Javad and crossed a bridge built over ships connected by chains to Iran. Some of them wrote that there was a settlement there resembling a city, houses built of bricks and reeds and plastered with mud, gardens. Famous artisans who produce carpets and various silk fabrics were said to have lived there. Antony Jenkinson, a merchant-traveler who was an agent of the "Moscow Company", reported: "Again, on the same October 6, 1562, I left Shamakhi with my companions, and after walking 60 miles, the king (Abdollah Khan Ustajlu, governor of Shirvan) with all kinds of fruits I reached the city of Javad, where there is a beautiful palace with many gardens."

According to Adam Olearius, it originated from the word "javaz", meaning crossing or ferry. On his way back from Iran in on April 6 1563, he met Abdulla Khan Ustajlu, the beylarbey (governor) of Shirvan in his palace in Javad. He received a document allowing free trade from Beylerbayi. In this document, a copy of which is kept in Jenkinson's memoirs, Beylarbayi states that it was written in his palace, it was confirmed with a seal in the 12th year of his reign, and he called himself "the reigning king of Shirvan and Girgan". Javad was a large settlement in the 17th and 18th centuries.

In the 1720s, they destroyed Javad and the surrounding villages as well as other regions of historical Shirvan. In the fall of 1726, Russian troops headed by General-Lieutenant Shtof entered the Javad settlement on the Kura River. The settlement was severely destroyed by the rebels. The border passed through the mulberry groves around the Kura and Aras rivers.

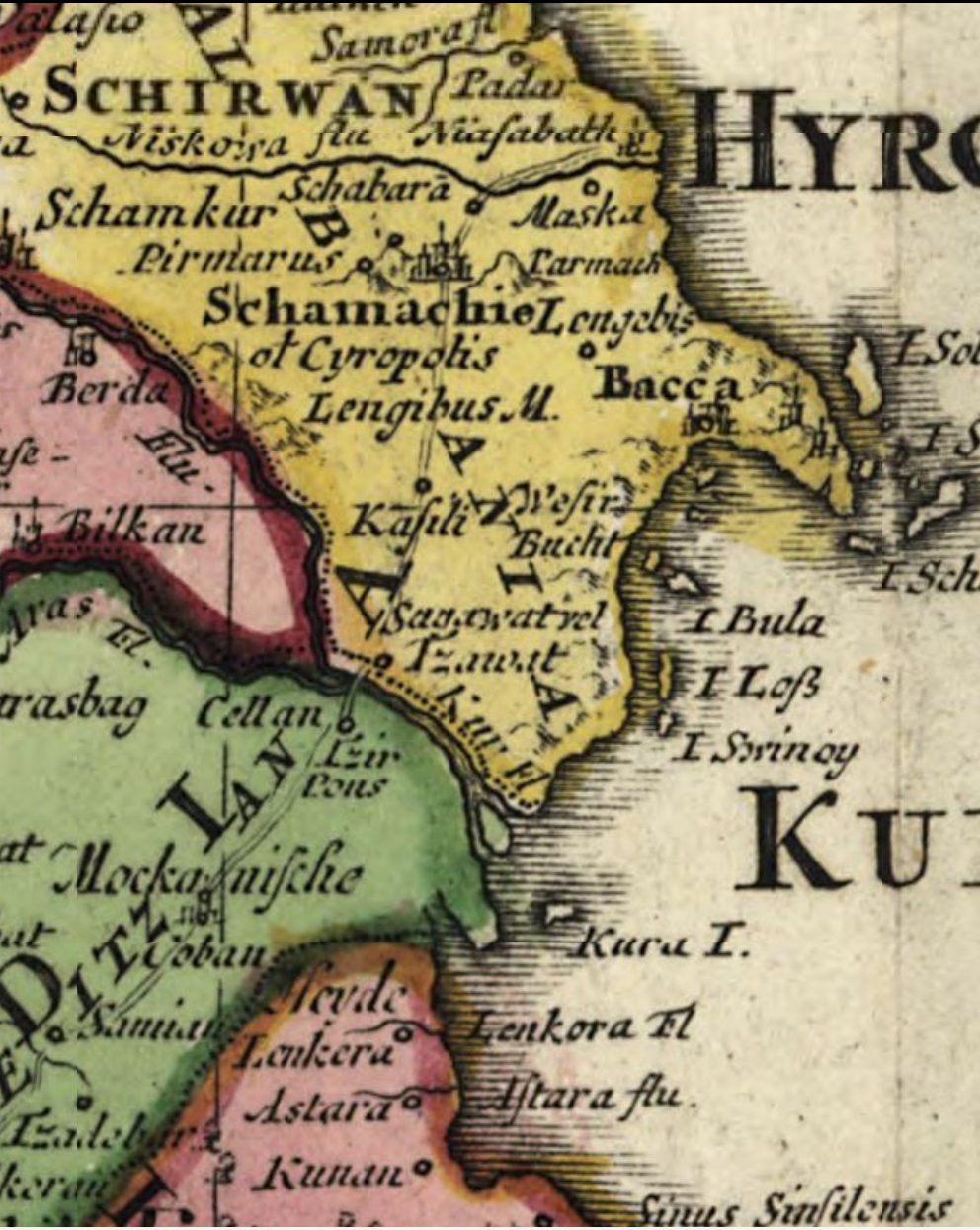
Javad (Tzawat). It was compiled in 1730. The author is Matthäus Seutter (1678–1757).

In 1778, the ruler of Gilan, Hidayat Khan, under Karim Khan, attacked Javad and captured Hasan Khan. On April 6, ruler of Gilan attacked Javad after capturing Salyan. The city was fired 7 times. The townspeople were in panic. It could not be defended. After that, Hasan Khan left the city with his brother and son and came to the ruler of Gilan to beg for forgiveness. According to historical sources, the population of Javad (between 900 and 7500 people) was transferred as captives to Rasht.

They were taken in the direction of Rasht and Anzali for use in heavy earthworks, fort construction, and agricultural. This event had a negative impact on the historical demographic situation of the population of Javad Khanate. Javad was destroyed and never recovered.

== Sources ==
- Абдуллаев, Г.Б. (1965). Азербайджан в XVIII веке и взаимоотношения его с Россией (in Russian). Баку: Изд-во Академии наук Азербайджанской ССР.
- Абдуллаев, Г.Б (1960). Иранские происки против кубин- ского ханства и Картли - Кахетинского царства в 1776 и 1778 гг (in Russian). Баку: Известия АН Азербайджанской ССР (серия общественных наук).
- Gerber, I. G. (1958). Описание стран и народов вдоль запад- ного берега Каспийского моря 1728 г [Description of the countries and peoples along the western shore of the Caspian Sea in 1728]. In Kosven, M.O. (ed.). История, география и этнография Дагестана ΧVΙΙΙ-ΧΙΧ вв. [History, geography and ethnography of Dagestan in the 18th-19th centuries] (in Russian). Moscow: Изд-во восточной литературы [Publishing House of Oriental Literature]. pp. 60–119.

== See also ==
- List of castles and fortresses in Azerbaijan
