= Genoese East Indies expedition =

1648 expedition by the Republic of Genoa

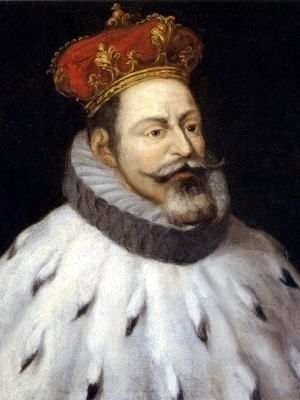
- Giovanni Battista Lomellini, Doge of Genoa from 1646 to 1648
Date	1648 – 1649
Location	Europe, Atlantic Ocean, Africa, and the East Indies
Result	Genoese failure; End of the Genoese East India Company (Note: Succeeded by the Compagnia Marittima di San Giorgio.)

Belligerents
(Republic of Genoa) CGIO	(Dutch East India Company) VOC

Commanders and leaders
(Republic of Genoa) Jan Maas (surrendered) (Republic of Genoa) Jan Benning †	(Dutch East India Company) Cornelis van der Lijn (Dutch East India Company) Capt. van der Meulen

Units involved
(Republic of Genoa) St. John the Baptist (Republic of Genoa) St. Bernard	Unknown

Strength
2 ships	15 ships

Casualties and losses
2 ships captured	None

The Genoese East Indies expedition, or simply the Genoese expedition, was a maritime voyage launched in 1648 by the Republic of Genoa with the aim of establishing a Genoese presence in the East Indies. The expedition ended in 1649 with the surrender of the Genoese ships to the Dutch East India Company.

== Background ==
From the very beginning, the Genoese expedition to the East Indies faced opposition from both the Portuguese and the Dutch, whose maritime powers were already well established in the region. As early as 1647, the Portuguese ambassador in The Hague, Francisco de Sousa Coutinho, had been informed from Lisbon about the Genoese plans.

By July, Sousa Coutinho had already warned the Dutch East India Company about the appearance of Genoese competitors and had agreed to collaborate with them to eliminate the threat. In September, both King John IV of Portugal and the VOC's governing board the Seventeen sent orders to their officials in Goa and Batavia, ordering them to block the Genoese expedition. On September 14, John IV also wrote to his agent in Genoa, Giovanni Giudice Fiesco, that "some merchants of that city were forming a company and outfitting vessels to enter the territories of India", which violated Portuguese monopoly on Indian trade. He also mentioned that the Genoese could obtain spices more safely and cheaply through Lisbon.

Despite this, the Republic of Genoa gave official support to the venture. On July 4, 1647, the Senate granted the newly formed "Compagnia di Negotio" (CGIO), a trading company with a capital of 100,000 scudi, a monopoly on commerce with the East Indies.

Explorer Jan Janszoon Struys recounts that two ships: the St. John the Baptist, which he boarded and was armed with 28 guns, and the St. Bernard, equipped with 26 guns, set sail from Texel on January 4, 1648, after some delay, under the command of John Maas. After a stormy two-month journey, the ships reached Genoa on February 25, 1648.

There, the Doge of Genoa commissioned both ships for an expedition to the East Indies, with the goal of establishing a Genoese presence and opening trade with the region, particularly Japan and its neighbors.

On March 5, fully loaded with supplies, weapons, and a crew of which two-thirds were Dutch, the expedition set sail again, beginning a planned three-year journey.

== Expedition ==
The Genoese ships passed through the Straits of Gibraltar six weeks after departure and continued south along the West African coast, facing Barbary corsairs, making supply stops at the Cape Verde Islands, and encountering Sierra Leonians. In Antongil Bay, they were met with armed Malagasy awaiting them, however, a reunion instead took place between Commander Jan Maas and Chief Diembro, a former slave of Maas who understood Dutch.

The stay in Madagascar was extended for many months due to monsoon winds. That autumn, Jan Benning died, and a dispute broke out over which of the two ship captains should succeed him. In the end, Maas resolved the issue by imprisoning one of them, Harmen Voogd, and appointing Hendrik Christiaensz in his place.

After a six-month stay, the expedition resumed its and reached the Indonesian archipelago near Sumatra in June. There, the Genoese initially made a deal with local authorities to purchase a cargo of pepper. However, some locals resisted the trade, mistaking the Genoese flag for that of the English, likely due to the shared use of the Saint George's Cross. Years earlier, Englishman John Weddell had left a bad reputation in the region as a pirate. In response, the Genoese seized two junks from the Aceh Sultanate. According to Reysen, the Italian crew committed sexual assault on a captured woman and threw Sumatran men overboard.

The Genoese continued raiding Acehnese junks for several weeks until they encountered a fleet of 14 ships owned by the Dutch East India Company, with vessels dispatched from Batavia by its governor general. Later reinforced with a man-o-war. Recognizing the threat to their trade monopoly, the VOC compelled Commander Maas to lower his sails and surrender. The ships were escorted to Batavia, the capital of the Dutch Asian empire.

== Aftermath ==
Upon arrival in Batavia, on April 26, the crew was by interrogated Captain van der Meulen with formal orders from Heer van der Lijn, then Governor-General of the Dutch East Indies, with Jan Maas dying shortly after arrival. After approximately two weeks in detention, the remaining crew submitted a petition for release, which was granted. Though technically guilty of threatening VOC trade interests, they were spared punishment, likely due to treaties of friendship between Genoa and the Dutch Republic, and the VOC's lack of personnel.

Many crew members, including Struys, were offered positions within the VOC. Struys signed a three-year contract as a sailmaker for 18 guilders per month, the same wage he had been earning under Genoese service.

Some of the other crew members returned home, concerned on the fate of the 312,000 reales in letters of exchange seized by the Dutch.

The seizure caused a diplomatic incident between Genoa and the States General, but neither side wished open rupture. Genoa relied on Dutch grain shipments, and the Dutch wanted to preserve good relations with a wealthy, neutral port. Correspondence dragged on for over two years.

On August 13, 1650, the Genoese government protested the seizure of its ships, claiming the expedition posed no threat to Dutch interests and had been openly prepared in good faith. The letter implied Dutch consul Muilman failed to warn the States General but made no direct accusations, likely due to the VOC's strong legal position. Genoa sought compensation and sent Gio Batta Cattaneo to The Hague. Later, in December 1650, news confirmed that both ships had been "miserably destroyed" in Batavia.

== Bibliography ==
- Boterbloem, Kees (September 30, 2008). The Fiction and Reality of Jan Struys. Palgrave Macmillan UK. ISBN 9780230583658.
- Struys, Jan Janszoon (1684). The Voyages and Travels of John Struys.
- Presotto, Danilo. Da Genova alle Indie alla metà del Seicento (PDF) (in Italian).
- Tosco, Giorgio Giòrs (2014). La Compagnia Genovese delle Indie Orientali e i rapporti fra Genova e le Province Unite nel Seicento (PDF) (in Italian). University of Pisa.
