= Arts of Fashion Foundation =

- Type: Nonprofit organization
- Headquarters: San Francisco, CA, United States
- Key people: Nathalie Doucet
- Website: www.arts-of-fashion.org

The Arts of Fashion Foundation is a 501(c) (3), public, non-profit organization, based in San Francisco, California. Established in 2001, the focus of the foundation is supporting creativity and design in fashion and the arts linked to it. Among their projects are the International Arts of Fashion Competition, The MasterClass Series, the CarteBlanche and Debut Series (and the latter's spinoff, InvestFashion), The Tandem Series and Fashion.edu.

The Foundation, in cooperation with the Council of Fashion Designers of America, created a petition in support of the Design Piracy Prohibition Act - IDPPPA (S.3728).

== Nathalie Doucet ==
Nathalie Doucet, a French-born US citizen, is the founder of Arts of Fashion Foundation. She is also the founder of InvestFashion, an online platform created to finance entrepreneurial fashion designers by way of crowdsourcing/crowdfunding. It is geared towards finding and uniting investors with awarded fashion designers.
