= East India (disambiguation) =

East India is a region of India consisting of the states of West Bengal, Bihar, Jharkhand, and Odisha.

East India may also refer to:

- East Indies, a term used by Europeans from the 16th century onwards to identify what is now known as South Asia and Southeast Asia
- East India Company, an English joint-stock company founded in 1600
- East India Docks, a small group of docks in the Blackwall area of East London
- East India DLR station, a railway station in East London

East Indian(s) may refer to:

- East Indian (ship), several ships
- Bombay East Indians, a Marathi-Konkani ethnoreligious group in Mumbai, India.
  - East Indian language, the dialect of Marathi-Konkani spoken by East Indian people in Mumbai, India
- Indian Americans, residents of the United States descended from migrants from India
- Indian Canadians, residents of Canada descended from migrants from India
- Indo-Caribbean people, residents of Caribbean countries descended from migrants from India

== See also ==
- Indian subcontinent
- East India Company (disambiguation)
- East Indies (disambiguation)
- East India Club
- Dutch East Indies, the Dutch colony that became modern Indonesia following World War II
