= Maiden Tower (Ismayilli) =

11th-12th century monument in Ismayilli, Azerbaijan

Coordinates: 40°52′45″N 48°09′32″E

- Azerbaijani: Qız qalsı
- Interactive map of Maiden Tower
- Location: Ismayilli, Azerbaijan
- Type: Tower
- Completion date: 11–12th centuries

Maiden Tower (Azerbaijani: Qız qalası) is the remains of a medieval fortress, located on top of a steep cliff 3 km north of Khanagha village, Ismayilli district, Azerbaijan. The exact construction date of the citadel is unknown. Historians attribute it to the 11–12th centuries.

== Architecture ==
The total area of the territory occupied by the Maiden Tower fortress is 1.5 hectares. The plan of the citadel has a complex shape. During the construction of the defensive structure, there were stone and baked bricks used. The outer part of the fortification is located in the Karasu valley. The length of this part of fortress is 28.6 meters, the height is 7.7 meters, the thickness of the walls in this place is 1.8 meters. There were arched gates located in the center.

The construction of a fortification on this territory was carried out in order to protect the mountain crossing.

The inner part of the citadel covers an area of 300 m^{2} and occupies a dominant position. It borders on a side with the eastern wall of the outer fortress, and on the other side there is a steep cliff. According to historians' assumptions, an underground tunnel 7 km long went from this defensive complex to the fortress of Javanshir.
