= East India Company (disambiguation) =

East India Company is a general term, referring to a number of European trading companies established in the early modern era to establish trade relations with and subsequently political control over the Indian subcontinent, the Indonesian archipelago and the neighbouring lands in Southeast Asia. They would include:

- British East India Company (1600–1874)
- Dutch East India Company (1602–1799)
- Danish East India Company (1616–1650), re-established 1670–1729
- Portuguese East India Company (1628–1633)
- Genoese East India Company (1649–1650)
- French East India Company (1664–1769), re-established 1785–1794
- Swedish East India Company (1731–1813)
- Austrian East India Company (1776–1781)

== Other uses ==
- East India Company (video game)
- The East India Company, a retail business founded by Sanjiv Mehta in 2010 and bankrupt by November 2025
- Dutch East India Trading Company, a defunct American record distributor

== See also ==
- 10649 VOC, a minor planet, the asteroid VOC (Dutch: Vereeniging van de Oostindische Compagnie, lit. 'East India Company'), the 10649th asteroid registered, a main-belt asteroid
- West India Company (disambiguation)
- East India Company College – Former college in Hailey, Hertfordshire, England
- East India (disambiguation)
- Colonial India – Period of Indian history characterised by European colonial rule
- Christianity in India
- Christianity in Indonesia
