= East Indian (ship) =

Several ships have been named East Indian:

- East Indian (1799 ship): See Seringapatam (1799 ship)
- East Indian (1815 ship) was launched at Calcutta. She remained a country ship, that is, a British vessel trading east of the Cape of Good Hope, until 1819. In 1819 she apparently sailed to England and may briefly have assumed British registry. By 1824 she had returned to Calcutta registry. She was wrecked in 1826 near Saugor.
- East Indian (1819 ship) was built at Hull in 1819. Her first major voyage was to carry immigrants to South Africa under the British Government's 1820 Settlers scheme. She returned to England but then wrecked on 22 or 23 December 1821 outward bound for London and Bengal.
- East Indian (1894 ship), of 1,745 gross register tons (GRT), was built by Robert Duncan & Co, Port Glasgow, as a steel, three-masted sailing barque. After a series of changes in name and ownership she was broken up in 1929.
- East Indian (1918 ship), of 8,159 gross register tons (GRT), was built in 1918 as Beikoku Maru (America ship) at Uraga, Japan, and completed in July as East Indian for the United States Shipping Board. On 3 November 1942 she was en route from Calcutta and Table Bay, bound for Punta Arenas, New York and Baltimore. She sank after being torpedoed by U-181.
