= Galagayin (fortress) =

Galagayin Fortress
- Azerbaijani: Qalaqayın/Qayın qalası
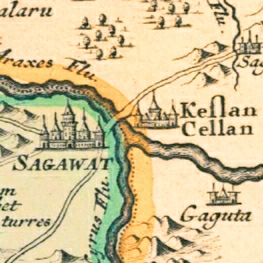
- A map of the Caspian Sea area made by Reiner Ottens (1698-1750), Jakob Keyser (1710-1745) by order of Peter I (1720). Javad and Galagayin ("Sagawat" and "Kellan") (forts)

- Location within Azerbaijan

General information
- Status: ruins have remained
- Type: Fortress
- Architectural style: Architectural school of Shirvan-Absheron
- Location: Qalaqayın, Sabirabad, Azerbaijan
- Coordinates: 39.9707°N 48.4621°E
- Construction started: The second half of the 13th century
- Demolished: 1868 year

Galagayin (Galagah, Kala al Nagia, Galagani) is a fortification and nahiyah fortress that surrounded the historical center of Qalaqayın, Azerbaijan.

== Background ==
The sound "y" in the toponym "Galagayin" was added in conversation. In the source of the last century, the name of the village is mentioned as "Galagani". A source compiled in the 20s of the 19th century shows that "Galagani" is the name of a fort, and the ruler of the surrounding villages lives there. It seems that this castle still existed in the Middle Ages, the German traveler Marshal von Biberstein, who was there in 1798, writes: "At the confluence of Kur and Araz, the ruins of the castle called Galagani can be seen. From this information, it is clear that the toponym "Galagayin" is divided into parts "Gala" - "fortified place" and "Kayin" and means "Kayin's fortress" as a whole. As mentioned, this toponym was actually like "Gala Gany", but the sound "y" was added in conversation. However, studies have shown that the word Gayin (Kanyi) in the toponym of Galagayin is it is the name of a tribe of Turkish origin. The names of the villages of Kani-Turgoba, Gani-Yurt and Kars province, which are part of this toponym, are known in other places. There are settlement names reflecting the name of this tribe in other countries. In Kazakhstan, there are 3 villages called Kaindi (actually it should be Kainli, because the "l" sound in Kazakh is pronounced as "d" and "t") and Kain there is a river called In Kyrgyzstan, there is a village and a tribe called Boston-Kain. A village named Kain (or Qain) is also mentioned in Iran. As early as the 13th century, there was a district and a city named Qain in the east of Iran-Khorasan. These toponyms show that they were created as a result of the settlement of the Kain tribe in different places. It is interesting that the tribe called Gain exists in the Bashkirs and the Shores in Western Siberia. Presumably, a certain part of the ancient Kain and Qain tribe came to Iran and Azerbaijan from the Khorasan side as part of the Seljuk Oghuz, and from there a part went to Georgia. A Turkic tribe named Qain lives near the city of Qum in Iran, and there are many toponyms reflecting its name. In 1796, Marshal Bieberstein, the author of the famous work "Flora tauro-caucasica", who accompanied Count V. A. Zubov on the Qajar campaign, and later as a sericulture inspector, often visited Galagayin, the South Caucasus region where Araz joins (Kur). At the confluence of the Araz with the Kur, the citadel attached to the Javad (fortress) was recently destroyed by Agha Muhammad Khan. Marshal von Biberstein, a German traveler who was there in 1798, writes: "At the junction of Kur and Araz, the ruins of a fortress called Galagani can be seen. Bieberstein believes that this is "Kala al Nagia" (Gala al Nahiya), which Herbelot considered a famous fortress on the border of Azerbaijan. In the report of Colonel Mishchenko of the Russian army to Adjutant General Paskevich, dated October 23, 1826, while he was in the Javad village camp; "I immediately received information from Hashim Khan, a high-ranking guard guarding Salyan, that the Persian (Qajar) troops who had been driven from the Javad Pass had stopped at Sarikamish and were immediately met by 2,000 soldiers. They stopped to help them at the Javad Pass to occupy the Mughan fortress of Galagain, and are still there. He does not yet know what they intend to do, but he will report to me after receiving the information he is interested in," he informed. This fact proves that the Galagayin fortress was repaired again by the Russians in the first half of the 18th century. In 1820, it existed as the center of Mughan Mahal as a fortress of Galagayin.

The mahalbayi (vicegerent) who ruled the Mughan Mahal used to stay in Galagayin. In the source, it was mentioned that up to 100 families settled in Galagayin. There was a paint house in Galagain whose rent was 150 Shirvan rubles. Previously (until 1820 — S. I.) the rent was given to Mustafa Khan. A customs fee of 6 abbas was charged for each load of the caravan passing through Mughan Mahal from Iran and other places. There were 6 salt lakes in 6 trees from Galagain. While the local population used the salt lakes without paying taxes, those who came to take salt from other parts of Shirvan province had to pay 1 abbasi per load. Mughan people living behind Kura were exempted from other taxes and duties, except for chervon (golden coin of 10 chervon). Instead, the people of Mughan had to prevent any danger coming from Mughan desert from the side of Iran, against Russia, guard and always be ready for military service. Thus, the people of Mughan paid a tax of approximately 1 chervon per family to the treasury.

== Source ==
- Azərbaycan toponimlərinin ensiklopedik lüğəti (in Azerbaijani). Bakı: Azərbaycan Milli Elmlər Akademiyası. Nəsimi adına Dilçilik İnstitutu. 2007.
- Fərzəliyev, Şahin-tarix elmləri doktoru, professor. (2012). Quba xanlığı: əhali tarixi və azadlıq mücadiləsi (in Azerbaijani). Bakı.
- Mustafazadə, Tofiq (2005). Quba xanlığı (in Azerbaijani). Bakı.
- Г.Б. Абдуллаев (1965). Азербайджан в XVIII веке и взаимоотношения его с Россией (in Russian). Баку: Изд-во Академии наук Азербайджанской ССР.
- Bayramova, Nailə (2009). Şamaxı xanlığı (in Azerbaijani). Bakı: Təhsil.
- Описание Ширванской провинции, составленное въ 1820 году, по распоряжению главноуправляющего въ Грузии А.П.Ермолова, генералмаером князем Мадатовымъ и действи- тельным статским советником Могилевским (in Russian). Тифлис: типо- графия Главного Управления наместника Кавказского. 1867.

== See also ==
- List of castles and fortresses in Azerbaijan
