= Javanshir Fortress =

- Azerbaijani: Cavanşir qalası
- Location within Azerbaijan

General information
- Type: Fortress
- Architectural style: Architectural school of Caucasian Albania
- Location: Lahij, Ismailli, Azerbaijan
- Coordinates: 40°48′07″N 48°11′59″E
- Completed: VII century
- Client: Javanshir

Technical details
- Material: Stone

Javanshir Fortress is a defensive fortress located 4 km north of the village of Talystan in the Ismayilli region, on the right bank of Aghcachay. The castle was built by the ruler Javanshir during the reign of Mehranids dynasty in the Caucasus Albania. The fortress is named after him. It is believed that the fortress was used as an administrative center.

== Structure ==
The fortress was constructed of lime and river stones. The area of the fortress is about 1.5 – 2 hectares. It consists of a fortress and an inner fortress called Naringala. It is surrounded by the valley of the Agchay river from three sides. The complex consists of the main part and Ichgala. The polygonal-shaped Ichgala was built on the highest point of the mountain. In most places only the basis of it remains. The walls of the Ichgala are demolished. The thickness of the southern wall of the main portion is 2 meters and its height is more than 10 meters. The western walls were completely destroyed by landslides. The defense complex includes 6 towers and their height are up to 8 meters. At the northern end of the tower there is a wall with a width of 2 meters and a ledge length of 50 meters. The wall is completed with a cylinder-shaped tower. The entrance to the castle was only from the southern side. There was a gate place with 2.5 m width. There were comb-shaped merlons about 0.5 m from each other on top of the walls. Tower was built to strengthen the walls of the castle. Ichgala is in the northern part of the fortress. Towers are four-cornered on the south, and rounded on other sides. Some of their diameters reach 8 meters. The main surveillance point is located at the northern end of the fortress. There used to be a hidden path on the north-eastern side of the fortress. This gave the opportunity to the fortress to communicate with the outside during a blockade.

The exact scheme of it was first compiled by Professor, Doctor of Geographical Sciences, Ramazan Tarverdiyev in 1963.

== See also ==
- Architecture of Azerbaijan
