= Indy =

Indy may refer to:

== Computing and technology ==
- Indy (software), used for Internet access to music
- Internet Direct (or "Indy"), a software library used in Delphi and C++Builder
- SGI Indy, a computer workstation

== People ==
- Indy (musician), a New Zealand singer-songwriter
- Indy de Vroome, a Dutch tennis player
- Indy Neidell, an American-Swedish documentarian, historian, and actor
- Indy Sagu, a British Sikh record producer, singer and DJ

== Periodicals ==
- The Indy, shorthand for newspapers that include "Independent" in their name, e.g.:
  - The Independent (Newfoundland), published in Newfoundland and Labrador, Canada
  - The Independent, a daily British newspaper
  - The College Hill Independent, published in Providence, Rhode Island
  - The Indydependent, a newspaper published by the Independent Media Center (also known as "Indymedia" or "Indy Media")
- The Indianapolis Star, a newspaper published in Indianapolis, Indiana (often referred to as the IndyStar)

== Sports ==
- Indianapolis 500, also known as "Indy 500", an auto race
- Gold Coast Indy 300, a former auto race
- IndyCar, auto racing sanctioning body for North American open wheel racing
- Indy Eleven, Indianapolis' United Soccer League team
- Indy Fuel, Indianapolis' ECHL ice hockey team
- Indy grab, a board-sport maneuver

== Other uses ==
- Indy (gene), a fruit-fly longevity gene
- Indy (album), the second EP by Motograter
- Independence High School (San Jose, California), also referred to as Indy, a public high school
- Indiana Jones, nicknamed "Indy", a fictional adventurer and archaeologist
- Indy (dog), the leading actor from the 2025 film Good Boy
- Indianapolis, nicknamed "Indy", the capital city of the U.S. state of Indiana and its surrounding metropolitan area
- Indy Aircraft, an American aircraft manufacturer based in Independence, Iowa
- IndyGo, the popular name for the bus service in Indianapolis

== See also ==
- Indi (disambiguation)
- Indiana (disambiguation)
- Indie (disambiguation)
