= East Indies (disambiguation) =

The East Indies are the lands of South (Indian subcontinent) and Southeast Asia.

East Indies may also refer to:

- Patriarchate of the East Indies, a Roman Catholic Church geographic division
- East Indie, a domestic ornamental breed of duck

== See also ==
- Danish East Indies, former Danish colonies in India and the Nicobar Islands
- Dutch East Indies, a former Dutch colony, now Indonesia
- East India (disambiguation)
- East Indies and China Station
- East Indies and Egypt Seaplane Squadron
- East Indies Barrier, a WWII allied battle line
- East Indies campaign (disambiguation)
- East Indies Fleet, a WWII-era British Royal Navy fleet
- East Indies Station, the British Empire naval duty station India, including the East Indies Squadron
- Indies (disambiguation)
- Indo-Australian Archipelago
- South Asia
- Southeast Asia
- Spanish East Indies, modern Philippines, Guam and the Mariana Islands
- West Indies
- West Indies (disambiguation)
