= West Indies (disambiguation) =

The West Indies are a subregion of North America and the island region of the North Atlantic Ocean and the Caribbean.

West Indies may also refer to:

- West Indies (film), a 1979 Algerian-Mauritanian film
- West Indies cricket team
- West Indies Federation, a short-lived Caribbean federation
- "West Indies", a 2021 song by Koffee
- Any of the territories within the West Indies during the colonial times:
  - British West Indies
  - Danish West Indies
  - Dutch West Indies
  - French West Indies
  - Spanish West Indies

== See also ==
- East Indies (disambiguation)
- Indies (disambiguation)
- West Indian, an inhabitant of the West Indies
- Dutch West India Company, a former chartered company of Dutch merchants
- The West Indian, a 1771 play by Richard Cumberland
- Western India or West India, the western region of India
