= Indie art =

Art produced independently

Indie art, a shortened form of independent art is art produced by artists independent of the mainstream commercial fine arts market, which includes such institutions as art auctions, art dealers, and major art galleries. Galleries featuring indie art also exist.

The term "indie art" is a parallel construction, following independent music's more commonly used, shortened name, indie music, and is similar in concept to other related terms like indie game, indie role-playing game and indie design.

== See also ==
- Economics of the arts and literature
- Outsider art
