= West India Company =

West India Company may refer to:

- Danish West India Company, (1659–1776), Danish-Norwegian chartered company, also active in the slave trade
- Dutch West India Company aka GWC or WIC (1621–1792), Dutch chartered company, with jurisdiction over slave-trade in the Atlantic, Brazil, the Caribbean, and North America
- French West India Company (1664–1674), French trading company, with a monopoly on the slave trade from Senegal
- Swedish West India Company (1787–1805), Swedish chartered company, main operator in the Swedish slave-trade
- West India Company, a band formed in 1984 by Vince Clarke

== See also ==
- East India Company (disambiguation)
