= Xanəgah, Ismailli =

Xanəgah
- Municipality
- Location within Azerbaijan
- Coordinates: 40°51′15″N 48°09′08″E
- Country: Azerbaijan
- Rayon: Ismailli

Population
  - Total: 505
- Time zone: UTC+4 (AZT)
  - Summer (DST): UTC+5 (AZT)

Xanəgah (also, Xanagah, Khanaga, Khanagyakh, and Khanegya) is a village and municipality in the Ismailli Rayon of Azerbaijan. Its population is 505.
