= East Indian (1819 ship) =

1819 ship

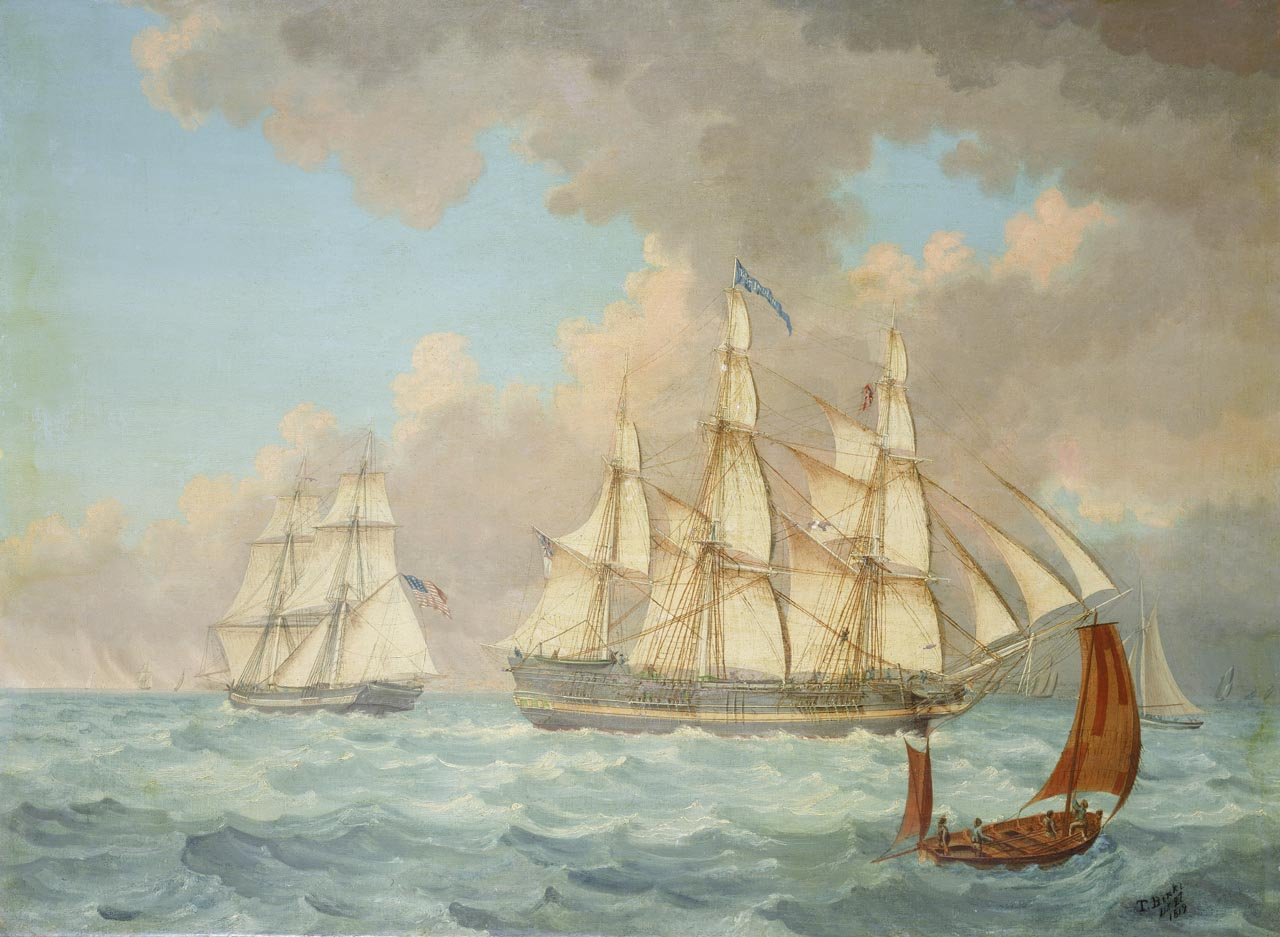
- The East Indiaman‚ East Indian, painting by Thomas A. Binks

History

United Kingdom
- Name: East Indian
- Owner: Bolton (or Boulton) & Co.
- Builder: Hull
- Launched: 1819
- Fate: Wrecked December 1821

General characteristics
- Tons burthen: 390 (bm)

East Indian was a ship built at Hull in 1819. Her first major voyage was to carry immigrants to South Africa under the British Government's 1820 Settlers scheme. She returned to England but then wrecked on 22 or 23 December 1821 outward bound for London and Bengal.

East Indian entered Lloyd's Register (LR) in 1819 with Wishart, master, Boltons, owner, and trade Hull–India. In its next volume LR showed her master changing from Wishart to A. Hogg.

== Emigrant ship ==
In 1820 East Indian carried 220 settlers to South Africa under the British Government's settler scheme. Captain Archibald Hogg left Cork on 12 February and arrived at Simon's Bay on 1 May. East Indian arrived at Saldanha Bay in mid-May.

== Loss ==
On 23 December 1821, East Indian was wrecked on the Kettle-bottom Sand, in the North Sea off Great Yarmouth, Norfolk. A fishing vessel rescued her 20 crew. She was on a voyage from Hull to London. Lloyd's List reported that a tremendous gale had driven East Indian, Knill, master, of and from Hull to London and Bengal, on to the Cross Sand, where she sank. In its next issue, Lloyd's List reported that East Indian had now nearly sunk to her tops, and that logs from her were washing ashore.

One source reports that she sank on Cross Island on her way from Bengal to London, but that appears to be a transcription error.
