= Indy Sagu =

Musical artist (born 1980)

Inderpal Singh Sagu
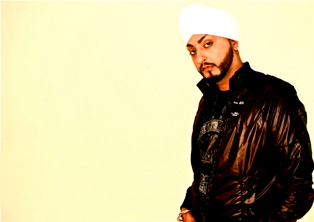
- Indy Sagu in 2009

Background information
- Also known as: Indy Sagu
- Born: 25 July 1980 (age 46)
- Origin: Bradford, West Yorkshire, UK
- Genres: British bhangra, hip-hop, UK garage
- Occupations: Record producer singer, multi-instrumentalist, entrepreneur
- Instruments: Harmonium, dholki, tumbi, tabla, vocals, synthesizer, keyboard, drums, drum machine
- Years active: 1996–present
- Labels: Lioncore, Virgin, Warner Bros., Sony BMG, EMI, World Music Network, Untouchables
- Website: www.IndySagu.com

Inderpal Singh Sagu (Punjabi: ਇੰਡਰਪਾਲ ਸਿੰਘ ਸਗੂ, born 25 July 1980), better known by his stage name Indy Sagu, is a British Sikh record producer, singer and DJ. Sagu has made a global name for himself as a leading Asian pioneer of fusion genre, his urbanized record production infuses the sounds and incorporates the elements, musical instruments, and hook lines of traditional bhangra with urban western sounds, primarily with a special emphasis on American hip hop.

== Life and musical career ==
Sagu was born and raised in Bradford, UK and began his professional musical career in his hometown in 1996. Sagu's musical talents were essentially inherited from his family's musical background. From an early age his father taught him how to play various Indian instruments such as the harmonium, dholki, tumbi, and tabla and Sagu then taught himself to play the keyboards and drums.

Having purchased his first set of turntables at age 16 he quickly made his debut in the Asian underground scene and became known throughout the UK as the pioneering DJ who infused traditional bhangra sounds into an urbanized street sound that was simply fun and unique. Sagu spent the proceeding four years in the DJ circuit and while DJing at major Asian events he began focusing on his record production and keyboard skills. His musical record production talents lead to him being signed with Untouchables Records in 2000 and he then focused on music production for other artists and began featuring on various compilation albums alongside American labels Warner Bros. Records, Virgin Records, Sony BMG, and EMI Records. The release of these urban compilation albums firmly established Sagu as a pioneering record producer. Sagu established a reputation as the Asian sensation hailing for the Untouchables Record label and was featured in The Face Magazine gaining the label "The Asian So Solid Crew."

In 2001, Sagu's breakthrough album The Debut launched his career in spectacular form by topping the UK Asian music billboards with hit releases "Bari Khol Khe," "Come to me Beautiful-Aja Soneeay," and "Let's Laugh & Dance-Haseeai Nacheeay." He won the UK Best Newcomer Award for his solo album The Debut. The Debut was critically acclaimed and was one of the most successful albums on the UK Album charts. It was the release of this album which helped popularize him as an artist and record producer worldwide particularly among the South Asian community.

In 2004, Sagu released his second album entitled Indyustructable which fulfilled the sudden demand surging from Britain for a genre combination of Bhangra and Hip Hop sounds. The album was significantly influenced by both sounds and the resulting sound was praised to be a genre that was inexplicable and distinctive to the record producer Sagu himself. Hit releases were "Son of a Sadar-Putt Saradaran Dhe," and "Let's Dance-Dovey Nachiey." This success helped further establish Sagu as a recognized urban Sikh artist and record producer across the Asian and mainstream community. Sagu featured on the Asian Beat Bazaar compilation alongside Virgin and EMI and featured on The Rough Guide to Bhangra Album alongside the World Music Network. This album brought together Asian artists and was credited as playing a role within the Bhangra music scene especially within the Asian Diaspora community, this further helped extend Sagu's international fan-base.

Sagu parted from Untouchables Records in 2004 and established himself as an entrepreneur, he founded his own independent label Lioncore Records and owns his own publishing company. Under his formed label he launched his third album Reincarnated in 2008 which served to re-affirm his artistic musical recording production talents. This album as the name suggests was the rebirth of Sagu both personally and as an artist in many ways. Empowering releases with strong meaningful lyrical content were "Gabru Top Dha," "Punjabi Gabru," and "Gideh Vich.". During the launch of this album Sagu assumed the role of being the record producer and record executive.

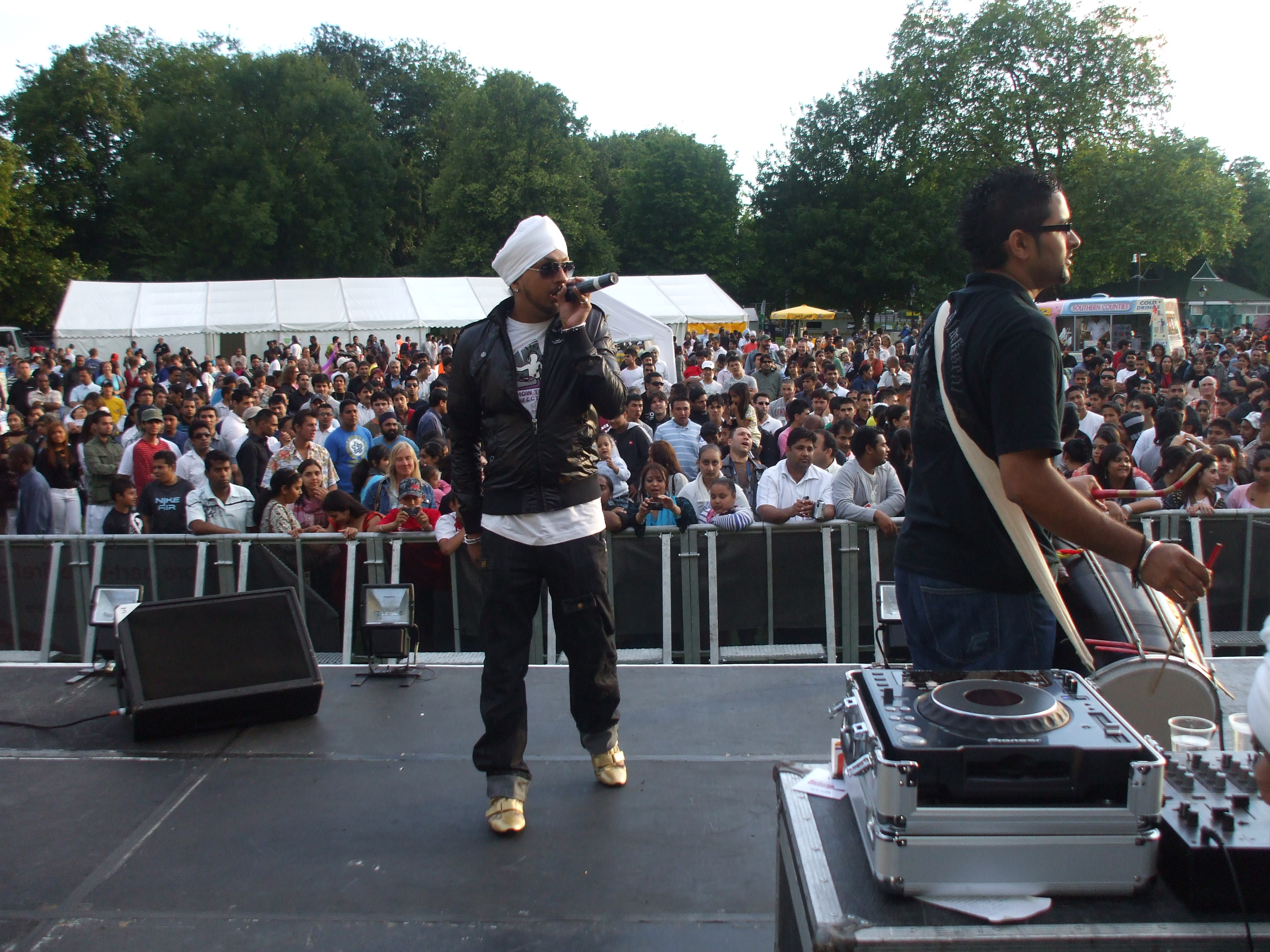
Indy Sagu "Don't Be A Victim" Campaign

Sagu released his 2010 bootleg IndyNation. The album features legendary hip hop artists. The tracks feature a fusion of British bhangra and hip hop. The album alongside his other solo and compilation albums have been musically composed, arranged, produced, and mastered completely by Sagu.

Sagu has toured internationally and has collaborated with Indian Artists Surinder Shinda, Kuldeep Manak, Bally Sagoo and performed alongside So Solid Crew, Jay Sean and Hip Hop artists Public Enemy, Pras from the Fugees, Craig David, and Sean Paul.

== Musical sound and inspiration ==
Sagu has found much success in record producing across many genres of music, particularly in his speciality of bhangra, hip hop, house, UK garage, and rock. Sagu spends time exploring and experimenting with a variety of sounds from various genres of music. Drawing on this wide array of genre inspiration he concentrates on the production of music, specifically infusing traditional Punjabi music with sounds from around the world. Sagu spends much time learning percussion with the goals to introduce new vibrant beats, well structured rhythms, funky riffs, sync fueled anthems, and captivating melodies along with meaningful lyrical content, all of which results in a refinement of a uniquely fused urbanized East-West street sound. His sound is also strongly influenced by his personal life experiences and his Sikh heritage. He encompasses these inspirational influences and incorporates them into the production of his music. Sagu is recognized as a leader who has redefined the music industry by focusing on creating a defying musical niche of fusion British bhangra that is distinct to him.

As a record producer, musician, and artist, Sagu is the sole producer who single-handedly composes, arranges, produces and masters all musical tracks with live multi-layered instruments, string arrangements, and piano loops. Sagu also performs using the harmonium, tabla, dholki, drums, and keyboards.

== Charity supporter ==
Sagu in 2008 formed an alliance with the UK Beat Bullying Organization. Sagu has become an official representative of the renowned two time award-winning UK Beat Bullying charitable organization. His mission is to support and promote this charity by educating and entertaining people through his music. He believes music is a powerful tool in influencing and expanding people's social consciousness and uses his music to unleash his suppression and to reach out to others. Sagu has taken a personal interest in helping people who have and who continue to be a victim of bullying and has therefore devised a campaign entitled "Don't Be A Victim" in support of the BeatBullying charity. Through this campaign he wants to bring global awareness that bullying exists and there are support systems for anyone who is being bullied. The campaign focuses significantly on empowering others to help reduce and whenever possible deter the increasing incidents of bullying amongst young adults as well as encouraging young adults to begin adapting a lifestyle that is "Bully-Free."

Sagu formed an affiliation in 2009 with UK Desi Donors Organization and stands proud to say "I’m a Desi Donor, are you?" Sagu is an official supporter of the Desi Donors Organization. Desi Donors aim is to promote and raise awareness for Bone Marrow and Blood Donation's within the Asian and ethnic communities. Their aim is to get more people on The Anthony Nolan Bone Marrow Trust's register of potential donors as there is currently an urgent need to increase the representation of Asians and minority ethnic communities on the register. In being an official representative of Desi Donors, Sagu supports the organization by using the power of his music to raise awareness and expand people's societal consciousness of the importance of being a donor. He will use the power of his music to educate and reach out to the Asian and ethnic communities.

== Discography ==
=== Albums ===
- TBA – Indy Sagu's Fourth Studio Album (2011) Lioncore Records
- IndyNation (2010) Lioncore Records
- Reincarnated (2008) Lioncore Records
- Indystructable (2004) Untouchables Records
- The Debut (2002) Untouchables Records

=== Compilation albums ===
- Bhangra Dance (2006) World Music Network
- Urban Explosion (2004) Warner Bros. Records
- Asian Beat Bazaar (2004) Virgin Records / EMI
- Danger 3 (2004) Untouchables Records
- Bombay Mix (2003) Sony BMG
- Urban Flavas 2 (2003) Untouchables Records
- Heavy (2003) Untouchables Records
- Danger 2 (2002) Untouchables Records
- Urban Flavas (2002) Untouchables Records
- Sounds of the North (2002) Untouchables Records
- Danger (2001) Untouchables Records

=== Collaborations ===
- Kuldeep Manak, "Metz & Trix" (2001)
- Metz & Trix, "Danger" (2001)
- Gubi Sandhu, "Dil Karda" (2003)
- Lehmber Hussainpuri, "Indystructable" (2004)
- Manak-E, "Indystructable" (2004)
- RDB, "Reincarnated" (2008)
- Ranjit Mani, "Danger 2" (2002)
