= Indi =

Indi may refer to:

- Indi, or Mag-indi language, a Malayo-Polynesian, in the Philippines
- Division of Indi, an electoral division in the Australian House of Representatives
- Parish of Indi, New South Wales, Australia
- Indi, Karnataka, a town in the state of Karnataka, India
- Instrument Neutral Distributed Interface, a distributed control system with particular focus in astronomical instrumentation

== See also ==
- Indie (disambiguation)
- Indy (disambiguation)
