= Galarsan-Gorarsan =

Historic fortress in Azerbaijan

Gelersen-Görersen fortress
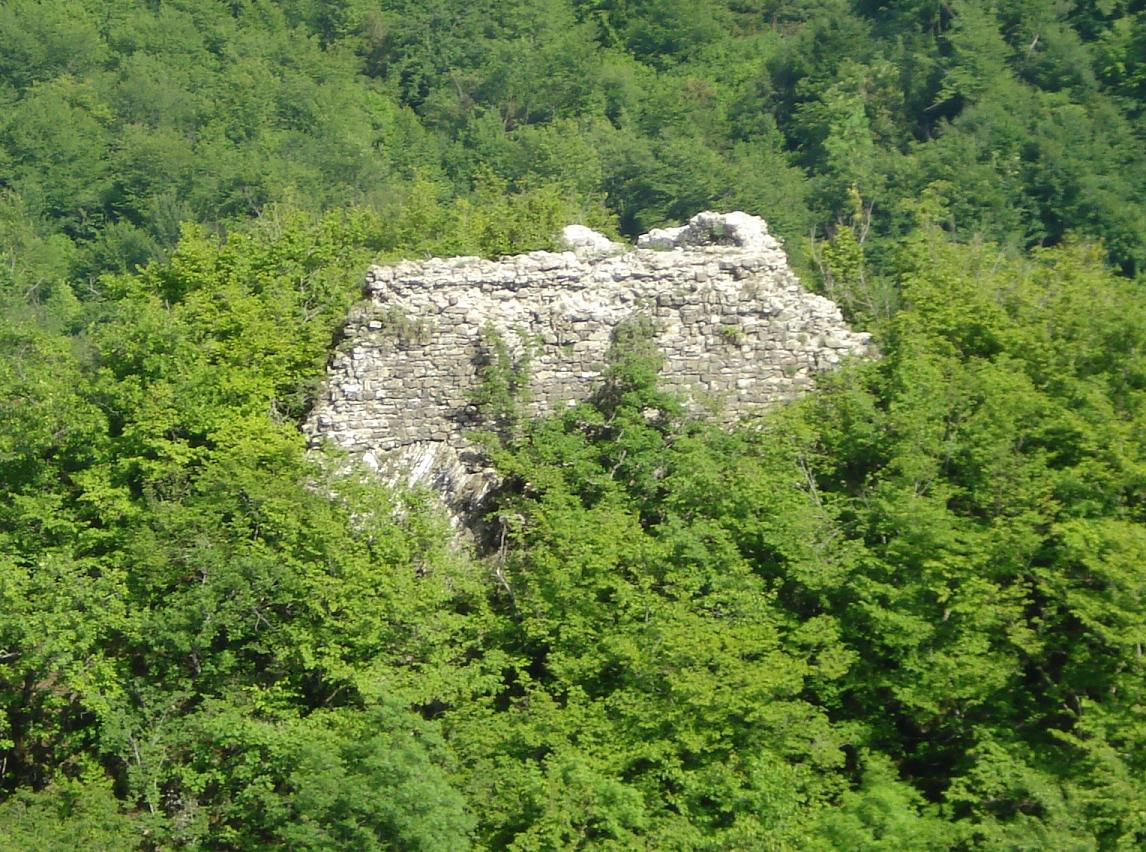
- Interactive map of the Gelersen-Görersen fortress area

General information
- Location: Shaki city, Azerbaijan
- Coordinates: 41.2633°N 47.2285°E
- Completed: 8th or 9th century

Galarsan-Gorarsan (Azerbaijani: Gələrsən-Görərsən) is a fortress in Azerbaijan, built in the Middle Ages, ruins of which remain on the coast of the Kish River, about 4 kilometres (2.5 mi) from Shaki city, on the summit of Garatepe Mountain.

== History ==
Construction of the fortress is dated back to the 8th or 9th century. Gelersen-Gorersen was thoroughly consolidated and was used for defence. In translation from Azerbaijani language the name of the fortress means “will come-will see”. An interesting episode from the history of Shaki Khanate is connected to it. When the ruler of Iran, Nader Shah, attacked Shaki Khanate in the 18th century, Haji Chalabi Khan, Khan of Shaki Khanate, secured in the fortress. When Nader Shah offered him to give in, Chalabi answered: “You will come and see”. The infuriated Nader Shah, who was not expected such an answer, decided to capture the fortress by force. In 1744, the Shah approached the fortress with a great army, but couldn't capture it and fell back. Since then the fortress was famed as Gelersen-Gorersen.

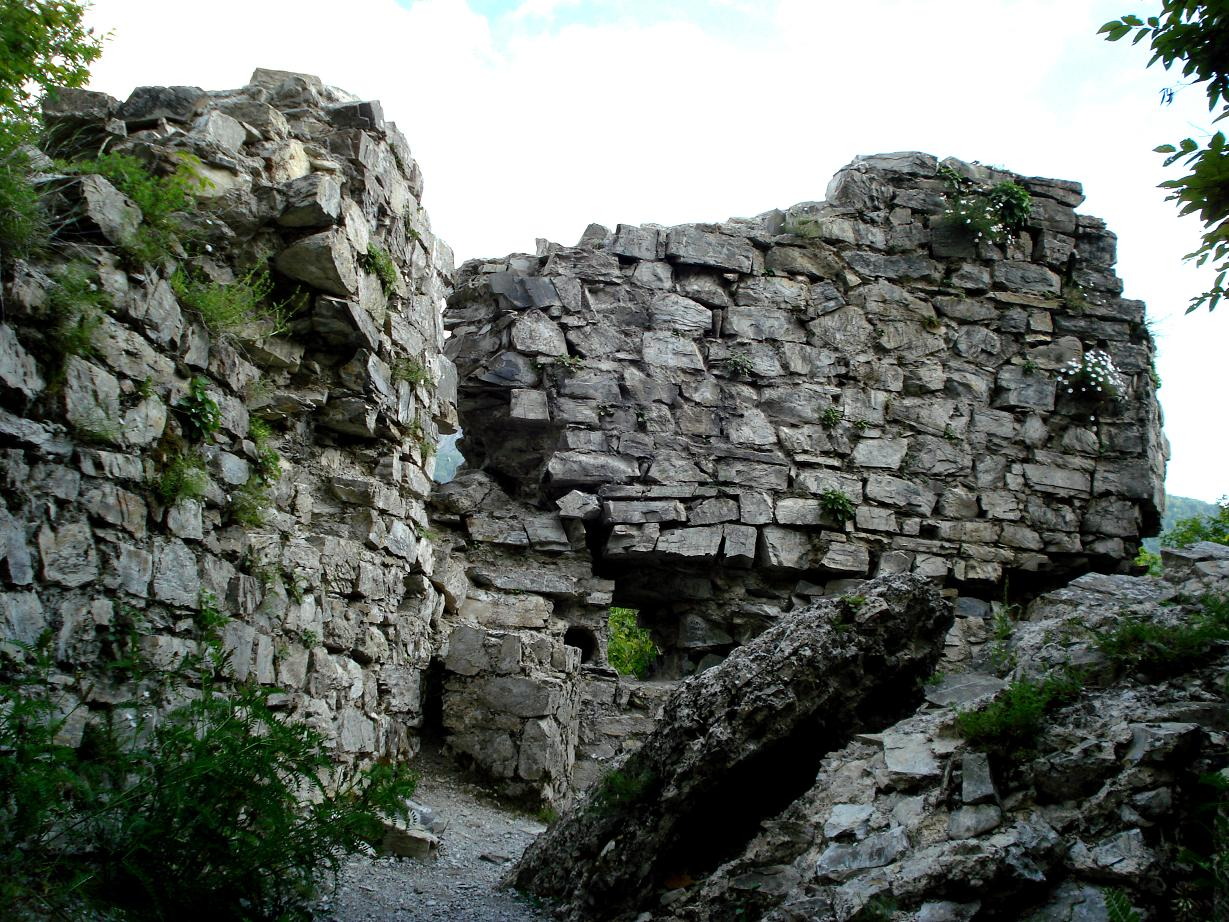
Walls of the fortress
