= Indie design =

Art movement

The indie design movement is made up of independent designers, artists, and craftspeople who design and make a wide array of products − without being part of large, industrialised businesses. The indie design movement can be seen as being an aspect of the general indie movement and DIY culture.

The designs created generally include works and art pieces that are individual to that creative individual. Such products may include jewellery and other fashion accessories, ceramics, clothing, glass art, metalwork, furniture, cosmetics, handicrafts, and diverse artworks.

== Marketing ==
Self-employed indie designers are supported by shoppers who are seeking niche and often handmade products as opposed to those mass-produced by manufacturing and retail corporations.

Indie designers often sell their items directly to buyers by way of their own online shops, craft fairs, street markets and a variety of online marketplaces, such as Etsy. However, they may also engage in consignment and/or wholesale relationships with retail outlets, both online and offline.

Corporate knockoffs

In recent years some large manufacturing and/or retail fashion and other lifestyle corporations have sold products which appear to closely resemble or directly copy innovative original works of indie designers and artists. This has caused some controversy.

== See also ==
- Design Piracy Prohibition Act
- Fashion design copyright
