= Independent soft drink =

Soft drink made by a small business

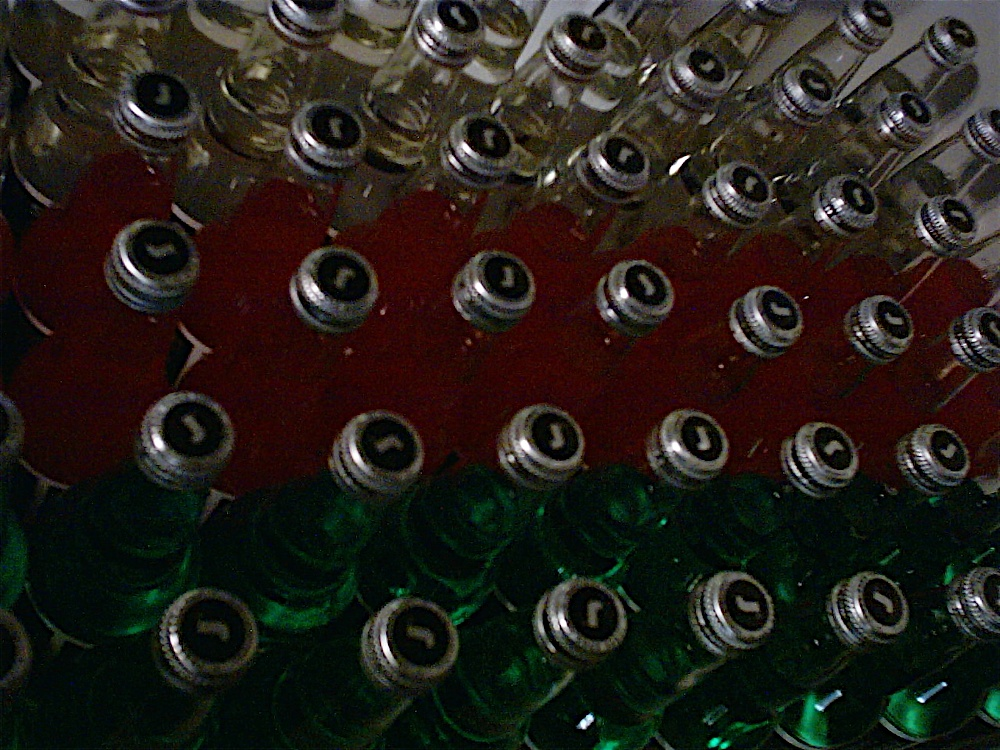
Bottles of Jones Soda, an independent soft drink

An independent soft drink is a soft drink generally made by smaller privately run businesses or smaller corporations who use alternative marketing strategies to promote their product.

The label was arguably started in the early 1970s in response to Coca-Cola and Pepsi Cola's mass media campaigns for the edge in the beverage market. Several groups decided to protest by making and in some cases publicly distributing their homemade brew.

Jones Soda is one of the more commonly known "independent" companies, founded in 1987, as well as Jarritos, a popular "independent" soft drink company based from Guadalajara, Jalisco, Mexico.
