= East Indian (1815 ship) =

History

United Kingdom
- Name: East Indian
- Builder: J.Kyd & Co., or Kyd & Richards, Kidderpore, Calcutta
- Cost: 150,000 sicca rupees
- Launched: 17 April 1815
- Fate: Wrecked December 1826

General characteristics
- Tons burthen: 518, or 53759/94, or 553 (bm)
- Length: 119 ft 9 in (36.5 m)
- Beam: 32 ft 9 in (10.0 m)

East Indian was launched at Calcutta in 1815. She remained a country ship, that is, a British vessel trading east of the Cape of Good Hope, until 1819. In 1819 she apparently sailed to England and may briefly have assumed British registry. By 1824 she had returned to Calcutta registry. She was wrecked in 1826 near Saugor.

== Career ==
A list of vessels registered at Calcutta in 1819 showed East Indian with H. Hogg, master, and Hogue & Co. owner. The Register of Shipping (RS) for (1820) showed East Indian with H. Hogg, master, Hogue & Co. owners, and trade London-Cape of Good Hope.

A list of vessels registered at Calcutta in 1824 shows East Indian with Peter Roy, master, and Davidson & Co., owners.

== Fate ==
On 25 July 1826, East Indian, Captain Peter Roy, was wrecked on the Saugor Sand. She had left Masulipatam on the 11th. She had attempted to ride out a gale that had come up but lost her anchors. By 26 December it was clear that she could not be saved. Roy and part of the crew took to her long boat and reached Edomonstone's Island (21.59°N 88.17°E). Some of the crew took to her cutter, which overturned; only two men were saved. Lloyd's List reported that she was coming from Rangoon, and stated that four men, natives, had drowned. It also gave the date of loss as 28 July.

== Sources ==
- Hackman, Rowan (2001). Ships of the East India Company. Gravesend, Kent: World Ship Society. ISBN 0-905617-96-7.
- Phipps, John (1840). A Collection of Papers Relative to Ship Building in India ...: Also a Register Comprehending All the Ships ... Built in India to the Present Time ... Scott.
