= Genoese East India Company =

Geonese company operating in India

The Genoese East India Company (Italian: Compagnia di Negotio or Compagnia Genovese delle indie orientali) was established by Genoa in early 1647 to profit off of the East India trade. Its first expedition, led by Jan Maes van Duijnkerken, resulted in the capture of the ships and the crew by the VOC at Batavia. Its successor, the Compagnia Marittima di San Giorgio, sent a few ships to Brazil but soon ceased operation.
