= Shaki fortress =

Fortress in Shaki, Azerbaijan

Coordinates: 41°12′14″N 47°11′48″E

Shaki Fortress
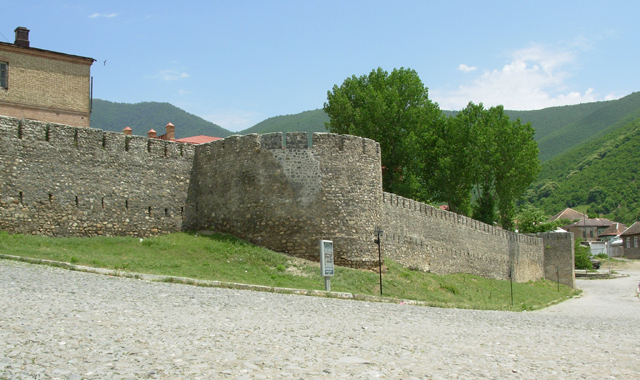
- Exterior view of Shaki Fortress
- Type: Medieval fortress
- Location: Shaki, Azerbaijan
- Built: 1743–1755
- Built by: Shaki Khan Haki Celebi

Shaki fortress is a medieval fortress located in the center of Shaki in northern Azerbaijan which served as Shaki Khan Haki Celebi's citadel. It consists of Shaki Khan’s palace.

== History ==
Built in the era of Shaki Khan Haki Celebi (1743-1755) in the capital of Shaki Khanate, the walls of fortress are 1,300 metres long, 2.2 metres thick and consist about 40 buildings. It reflects the important administrative and commercial role of the city and the status of hub of the silk trade, which the city had earlier. The winter palace, built in 1797, which acted as residence for the khan’s family and as servant’s quarters during Khan's reign is inside the fortress, and was inscribed as UNESCO World heritage site in 2019.

== Later history ==
The fortress underwent a restoration between 1958 and 1963. The city is based on the forests of the Greater Caucasus Mountains, while the fortress lies on the southern part of the range.
