= Design Piracy Prohibition Act =

The Design Piracy Prohibition Act, H.R. 2033, S. 1957, and H.R. 2196, were bills of the same name introduced in the United States Congress that would have amended Title 17 of the United States Code to provide sui generis protection to fashion designs for a period of three years. The Acts would have extended protection to "the appearance as a whole of an article of apparel, including its ornamentation," with "apparel" defined to include "men's, women's, or children's clothing, including undergarments, outerwear, gloves, footwear, and headgear;" "handbags, purses, and tote bags;" belts, and eyeglass frames. In order to receive the three-year term of protection, the designer would be required to register with the U.S. Copyright Office within three months of going public with the design.

== H.R. 2511, 112th Congress ==
H.R. 2511 was introduced July 13, 2011, by Representative Robert Goodlatte [R-VA6] with thirteen co-sponsors. On August 25, 2011, the U.S. House Committee on the Judiciary referred the Bill to the U.S. House Subcommittee on Courts, the Internet, and Intellectual Property. http://www.govtrack.us/congress/bill.xpd?bill=h112-2511

== H.R. 2033, 110th Congress ==
H.R. 2033 was introduced April 25, 2007, by Representative Bill Delahunt with fourteen co-sponsors. On May 4, 2007, the U.S. House Committee on the Judiciary referred the Bill to the U.S. House Subcommittee on Courts, the Internet, and Intellectual Property. A hearing was held February 14, 2008, but the bill never made it out of the subcommittee.

== S. 1957, 110th Congress ==
S. 1957 was introduced on August 2, 2007, in Washington, D.C. by Senator Charles Schumer (D-NY) with ten co-sponsors. The bill was referred to the Senate Committee on the Judiciary but progressed no further.

== H.R. 2196, 111th Congress ==
H.R. 2196 was introduced on April 30, 2009, by Representative Delahunt and twenty-three co-sponsors. The bill was referred to the House Committee on the Judiciary on the same day and then stalled in committee.

== Current Status of Fashion Design Protection ==
Currently, fashion may be protected by copyright only to the extent that its shape is non-utilitarian enough to qualify as a creative "sculpture," or to the extent that a design, pattern, or image on the clothing qualifies as "pictorial" or "graphic." While current laws against counterfeit goods do provide some protection for designers, this is so only when the trademark is used and not when merely the design is copied under a different label. In addition, fashion may be protected by design patents if the requirements for patentability are met. To be patentable an ornamental design must be new, original and non-obvious. The United States Patent and Trademark Office website (www.uspto.gov) has a searchable database of patents, and includes patents on apparel in class D2, carrying articles in class D3, and eyeglass frames in class D16. Technological advances to the means of textile and garment production, as well as increases in the number of distribution channels and the availability of cheap labor in emerging economies have enabled those who would copy these designs to do so quickly and inexpensively. Legislation targeting design piracy has already been enacted in Europe, India, and Japan.

== Criticism ==
Critics claim that, contrary to the bill's claims, the bill will actually harm independent fashion designers. The majority of independent designers do not have the litigation funds to effectively challenge big business should they be accused of copyright infringement. Furthermore, because distributors of accused designs can be penalized as well as the designer, distributors of clothing will become very wary of new designs unless the designer has adequate funds, influence, and power to hire skilled and effective lawyers. Pattern companies frequently utilize prevailing trends; so they too are vulnerable. Because of the legal risks of producing fashion patterns, fewer people will sew their own clothing, and fabric and sewing stores will suffer losses as well. As evidence of the bill's hypocrisy, critics point to how one of the most vocal supporters of the bill, Diane von Fürstenberg, was recently caught copying and distributing a piece of clothing originally designed by an independent Canadian designer. Critics also argue that the industry is already thriving commercially and encourages innovation. They point attention to the concept that originality in fashion design is too insubstantial for copyright law to distinguish protected elements from non-protected elements, and that extending copyright protection would stifle independent designers while giving powerful, big-business fashion houses a near-monopoly.

== Related Bills ==
=== H.R. 5055, 109th Congress: To Amend Title 17, United States Code, to Provide Protection for Fashion Design ===
H.R. 5055 was introduced March 30, 2006, by Representative Robert W. Goodlatte (R-Va.), with six co-sponsors from both parties. The bill was referred by the U.S. House Committee on the Judiciary to the U.S. House Subcommittee on Courts, the Internet, and Intellectual Property.

The subcommittee held a hearing on the bill on July 27, 2006, at which there was disagreement among legal experts as well as representatives of the fashion industry as to whether there was a need for copyright protection. Proponents of the Act claimed that new technology threatened American designers' ability to compete with the products of lower-cost countries, because the distribution of images of new designs and the automation of copying and manufacturing could occur within hours. They additionally pointed out that the United States was the exception among western nations in failing to protect designs.

=== S. 3728, 111th Congress: Innovative Design Protection and Piracy Prevention Act ===
S.3728 was introduced on August 5, 2010, by Senator Chuck Schumer with ten co-sponsors. On December 1, 2010, the Senate Committee on the Judiciary voted unanimously for the bill to proceed to the Senate floor. This is the furthest that any of the design bills has progressed since 2006.

Under the IDPPPA, a copy of a design would have infringed if it was found to be "substantially identical" to the original work with little to no changes to set that design apart. Penalties for false representation would have been increased from $500 to $5,000 and from $1,000 to $10,000. "Apparel" items that would be protected by this Act include women's, men's, and children's clothing as well as luggage, handbags, wallets and eyeglass frames. A "fashion design" under the IDPPPA would be defined as an entire article of apparel including its embellishment and also includes elements of the original apparel that are the creative work of the original designer and are unique.

Supporters argue that this act would create more protection for fashion designers. Opponents have argued that the bill would "bring more lawyers into every step of the design process," outlaw "inspiration and creativity," prevent "unrestricted use of works in the public domain," and "slow down the fast-paced design process." Some designers have supported the IDPPPA for protecting their current and future fashion designs. For example, Kurt Courtney of the AAFA has praised the bill as a "great compromise and a product of hard work," but added that its effects will largely be seen in court cases involving the bill.

=== S. 3523, 112th Congress: Innovative Design Protection Act ===
S.3523 was introduced on September 10, 2012, by Senator Chuck Schumer with ten co-sponsors. On September 20, 2012, the Senate Committee on the Judiciary voted for the bill to proceed to the Senate floor without amendment.

== See also ==
- Sara R. Ellis, Copyrighting Couture: An Examination of Fashion Design Protection and Why the DPPA and IDPPPA are a Step Towards the Solution to Counterfeit Chic, 78 Tenn. L. Rev. 163 (2010), available at http://ssrn.com/abstract=1735745.
- Witnesses Clash on Need for Granting Copyright Protection to Fashion Designs, Anandashankar Mazumdar. BNA's Patent, Trademark & Copyright Journal, August 4, 2006.
- Intellectual property legislation pending in the United States Congress
- THOMAS
