= Maiden Tower (Szczecin) =

Historical defensive tower in Szczecin, Poland

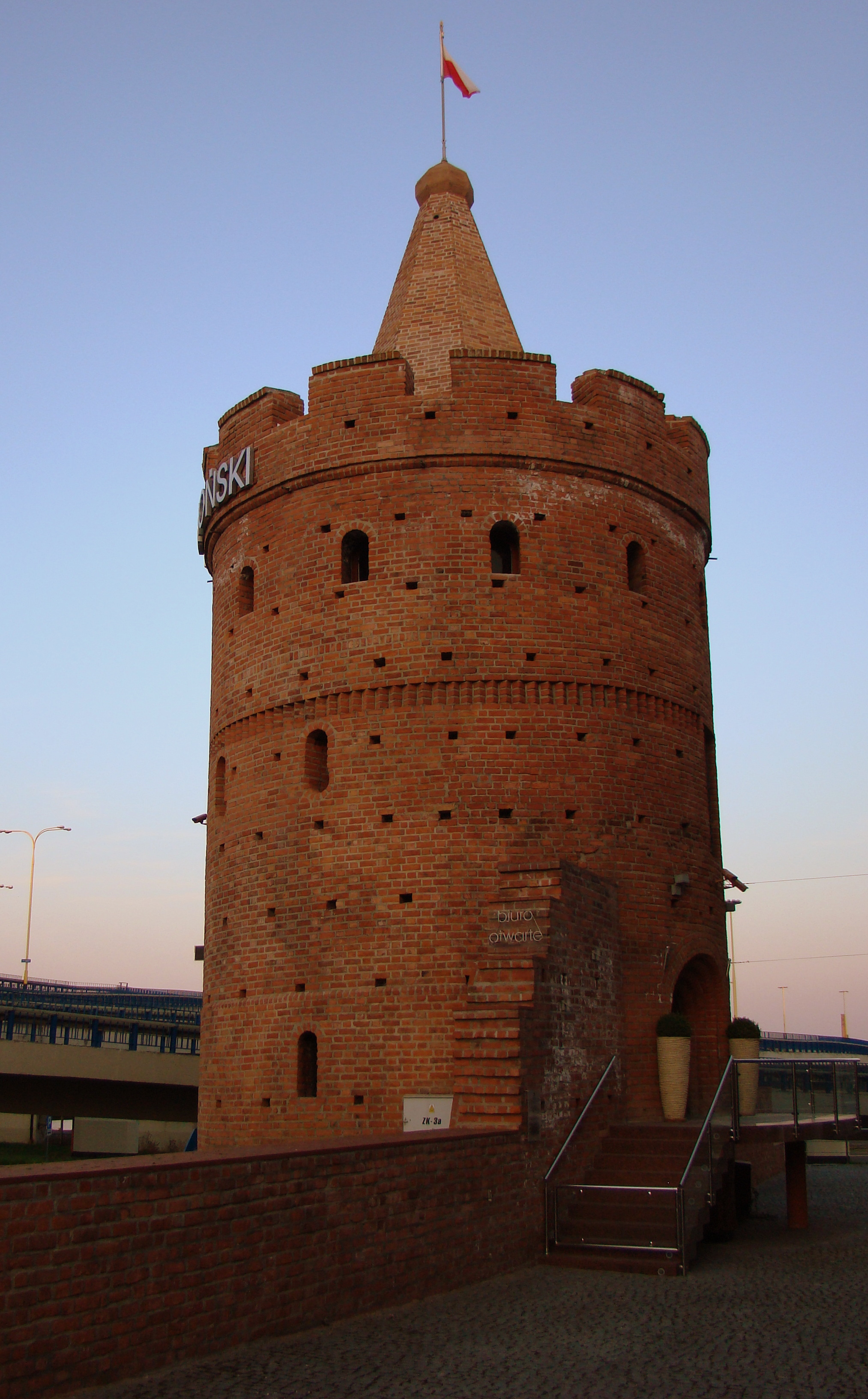
- The building in 2009.
- Interactive map of the Maiden Tower area

General information
- Type: Defensive tower
- Architectural style: Gothic
- Location: Szczecin, Poland, 47 Panieńska Street
- Coordinates: 53°25′34.5″N 14°33′45.6″E
- Completed: 15th century
- Renovated: 1961–1964

Dimensions
- Diameter: 9 m

Technical details
- Floor count: 2 (+ 1 underground)

The Maiden Tower (Polish: Baszta Panieńska; German: Frauenturm), also known as the Tower of Seven Coats (Polish: Baszta Siedmiu Płaszczy; German: Siebenmantelturm), is a historic Gothic defensive tower in Szczecin, Poland. It is located at 47 Panieńska Street in the administrative neighbourhood of the Old Town. It was constructed in the 15th century, sometime before 1462, as part of the city fortifications. It was decommissioned in the 18th century, and partially deconstructed at the turn of 20th century. Its base was used to construct a tenement, which was ultimately destroyed in 1944, while the tower was reconstructed and restored between 1961 and 1964.

== History ==
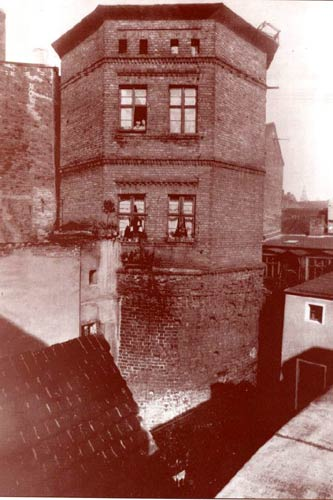
The tenement house build on the base of the Maiden Tower, sometime prior to 1945.

The two-storey tower was constructed as part of the city fortifications, sometime before 1462. It was used to guard the nearby Maiden Gate (Polish: Brama Panieńska; German: Frauentor), which is how the tower got its name. It in turn was named as such, as a street crossing it led to the female Cisterian monastery. The tower was financed by the local tailors, who are believed to also serve in its defence during attacks. As such it also became alternatively known as the Tower of Seven Coats. Until 1723, it was used as a prison for people sentenced to executions.

It was the only tower that was not deconstructed together with the rest of old city fortifications between 1724 and 1740. With time, it became surrounded by tenement houses, and became being used as a storage unit. Sometime at the turn of 20th century, probably corresponding to the decommission of the city fortresses, the upper portion of the tower was deconstructed. On its base was constructed an octagonal tenement building. It survived until 1944, when it was destroyed during a carpet bombing raid, together with most of the Old Town. In 1954, the tower was given the status of a protected cultural property. The remaining rubble was cleaned up in 1956, and the tower was reconstructed between 1961 and 1964.

== Characteristics ==
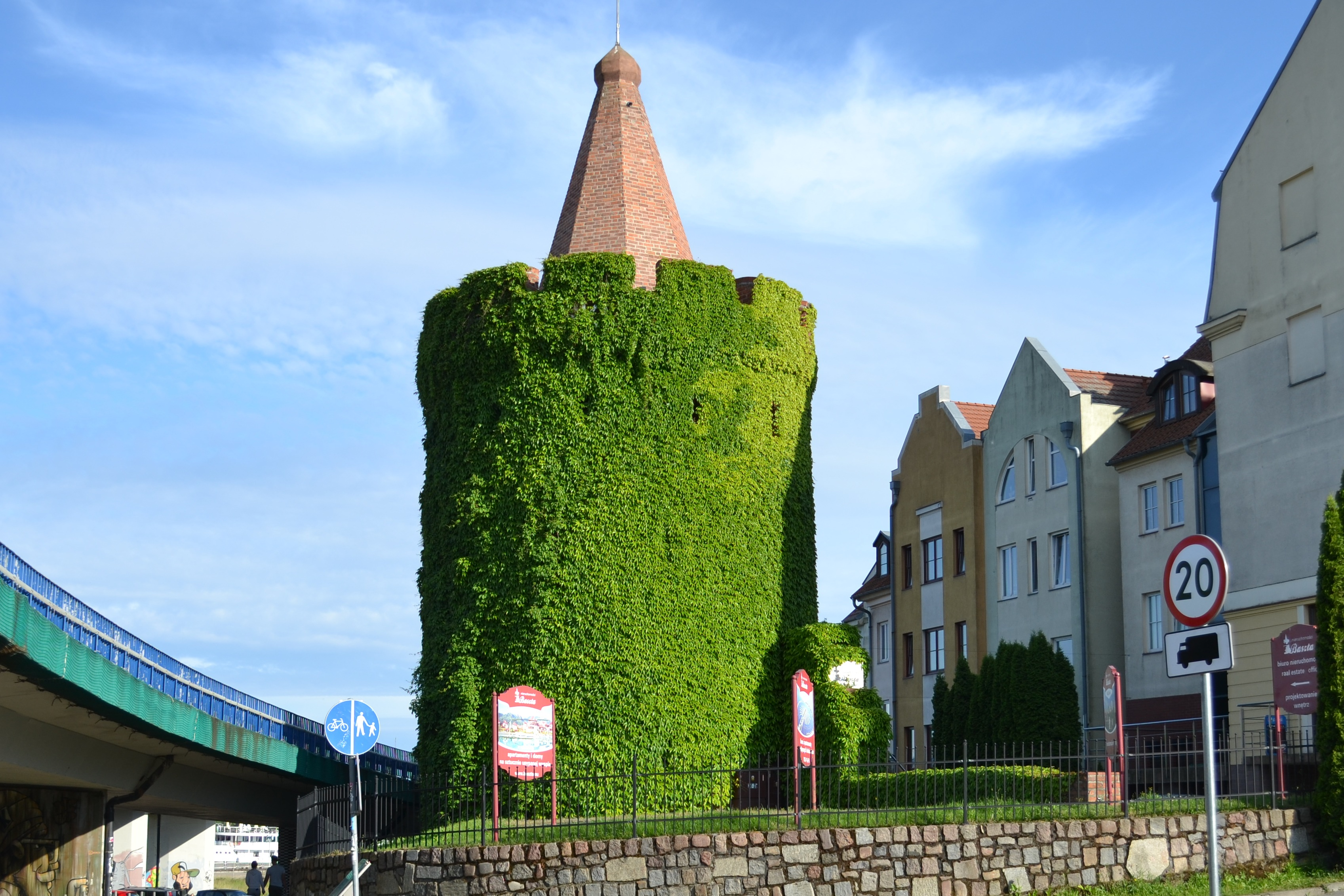
The Maiden Tower in 2021, covered in the foliage.

The Maiden Tower is a Gothic defensive tower of the former city fortifications, with outer diameter of 9 m, and inner diameter of 3.6 m. It has three storeys, including an underground one with the height of 4.6 m, the ground floor with 4.4 m, and the first floor with 2.5 m. It is topped off with battlement and tented roof.
