= Indie literature =

Book published outside mainstream publishing

The National Literary Awards define independent or "indie" literature as "books published outside mainstream publishing." Such books are rarely recognized and hard to pin down, but some examples include "Damastor" by Dimitri Iatrou, "Returning Home" by Marcus Blake and "Hope...Joy (and a Few Little Thoughts) for Pregnant Teens" by Rachel Brigoni.

== See also ==
- Indie publisher
