= Koroghlu Fortress =

Koroghlu fortress
- Azerbaijani: Koroğlu qalası
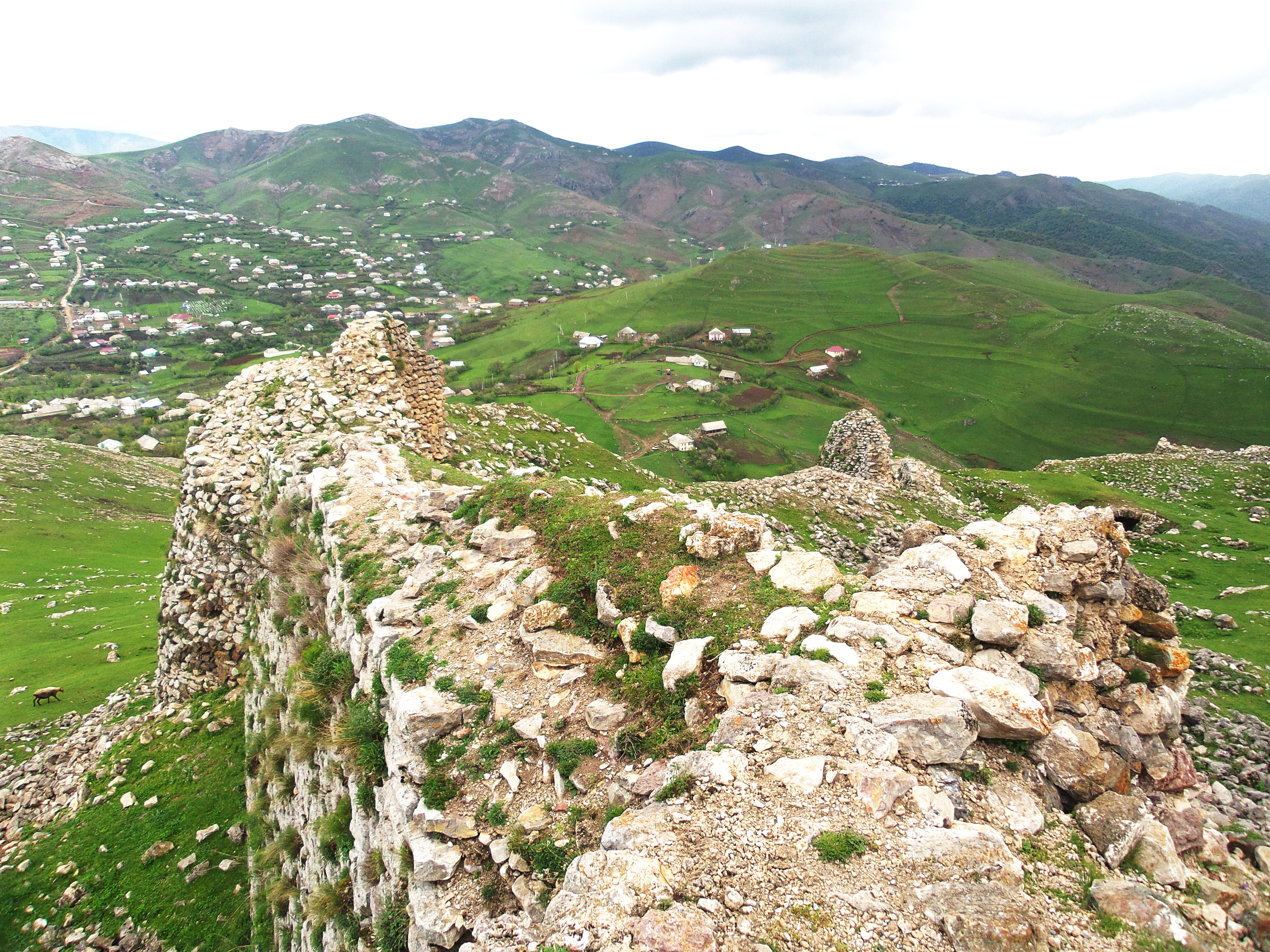

- Location within Azerbaijan

General information
- Type: Fortress
- Architectural style: Architectural school of Arran
- Location: Gala village, Gadabay, Azerbaijan
- Coordinates: 40.488714°N 45.752824°E
- Completed: 16th century

Technical details
- Material: Stone

Koroghlu fortress is a fortress located in the village of Gala in Gadabay district, Azerbaijan.

== History ==
The name of the fortress is connected to Koroglu, the national hero of the Turks. Fortresses with this name are encountered in Shamkir, Gadabay, Tovuz and other regions. Generally, common features of the Koroghlu fortresses are that they are mostly built in the 17th century and in a strategic military position in inaccessible places at high altitudes. Some researchers state that the age of the monument is older. According to them, the age of these monuments dates back further than Koroglu, who lived in the 16th–17th centuries.

== Location ==
It is located at an altitude of 2,000 meters above sea level. The fortress is located between the villages of Galakand and Miskinli, on the peak of a rocky cliff. The monument can be climbed only by foot. The western side of the tower is a steep cliff. The thickness of the walls is about 1 meter. Inside the fortress there are the ruins of windmill, tandoor and water reservoir. According to local residents, there are hidden underground roads that have not yet been explored in the fortress.

== See also ==
- Architecture of Azerbaijan
