= United States House Judiciary Subcommittee on Courts, the Internet, and Intellectual Property =

United States House Judiciary Subcommittee on Courts, the Internet, and Intellectual Property is a subcommittee within the House Committee on the Judiciary. It has jurisdiction over the following subject matters: copyright, patent, trademark law, information technology, antitrust matters, other appropriate matters as referred by the chairman, and relevant oversight.

== Members, 112th Congress ==
Majority	Minority
Bob Goodlatte, Virginia, Chairman; Howard Coble, North Carolina, Vice Chair; Jim Sensenbrenner, Wisconsin; Steve Chabot, Ohio; Darrell Issa, California; Mike Pence, Indiana; Jim Jordan, Ohio; Ted Poe, Texas; Jason Chaffetz, Utah; Harry Reid, Nevada; Charles H. Griffin, Mississippi; Tom Marino, Pennsylvania; Sandy Adams, Florida; Ben Quayle, Arizona	Mel Watt, North Carolina; John Conyers, Michigan; Howard Berman, California; Judy Chu, California; Ted Deutch, Florida; Linda Sánchez, California; Debbie Wasserman Schultz, Florida; Jerrold Nadler, New York; Zoe Lofgren, California; Sheila Jackson Lee, Texas; Maxine Waters, California

== See also ==
- United States House Committee on the Judiciary
