= Talıstan =

- Municipality
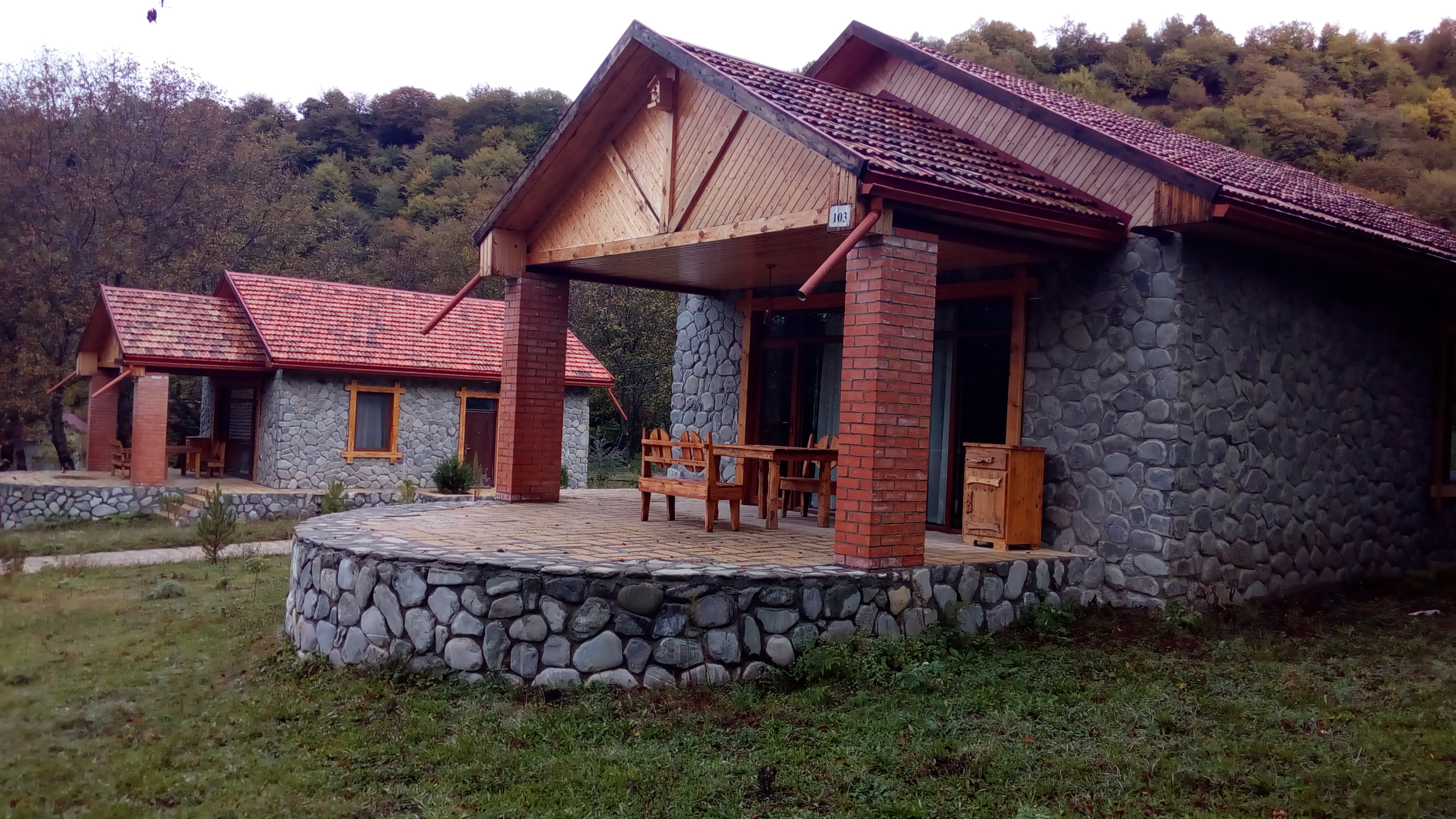
- Talıstan Forest Park

- Location within Azerbaijan
- Coordinates: 40°48′00″N 48°12′07″E
- Country: Azerbaijan
- Rayon: Ismailli

Population
  - Total: 2,183
- Time zone: UTC+4 (AZT)
  - Summer (DST): UTC+5 (AZT)

Talıstan (also, Talystan) is a village and municipality in the Ismailli Rayon of Azerbaijan. It has a population of 2,183.
