= Maiden Tower (Jabrayil) =

Architectural monument on Diridag Mount, Jabrayil Rayon, Azerbaijan

The Maiden Tower is an architectural monument, located on Diridag Mount in the Jabrayil region of the Azerbaijan Republic.
