= Maiden Tower (Gadabay) =

Medieval defensive tower in Söyüdlü, Gadabay, Azerbaijan

- Qız Qalası (Azerbaijani); برج دختر (Persian)
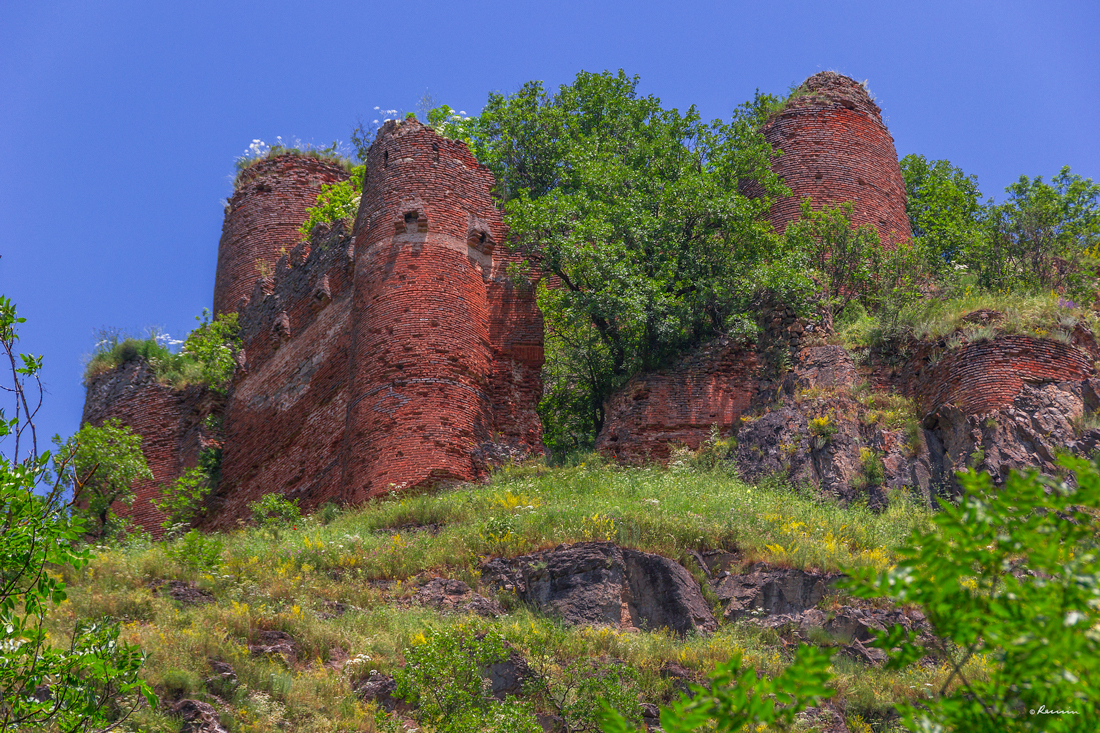
- Interactive map of Maiden Tower
- Location: Gadabay, Soyudlu

Site notes
- Elevation: 1800-2000 metres

Maiden Tower or Namerdgala (Azerbaijani: Qız Qalası or Namərdqala; Persian: برج دختر or نامرگلا) is a medieval defensive tower located in Azerbaijan Republic, Gadabay rayon, Soyudlu village.

== About ==
The monument is an integral part of the Khojaly–Gadabay cultural heritage. The tower is a local important architectural monument.

Maiden Tower is located in a densely wooded and mountainous area about 7–10 km from Soyudlu village. The tower was raised on a rocky shore along the Shamkir River. It is possible to climb on foot to the castle, which is surrounded by greenness and forests. The castle consists of five circular columns. Entry and exit are invisible. Columns are various in height and diameter. Circular-shaped constellations rise from the corners of the fort. The tower has two levels inside, which correspond to the rugged mountain relief. On the top floor, in the highest part of the mountain, there is a five-corner shaped inner tower. At the lower level, the second section of the fort is located. The part of the monument, which passes through the walls and constellations as a belt and completes the crown above, greatly enhanced the protection of the tower. Mountain towers were usually built of surrounding rocks and stones brought from river beds. The difference between the tower and other mountain forts is that its walls were made of baked bricks, and were covered with a number of polished bricks.

== History ==
At this time, it is not known what the historic significance of the tower and when it was built. Some researchers consider it to be the work of the 12th century - the Eldiguzids - era, because of its basic construction material and architectural features. But according to various sources the tower was built in 9th century. In official sources it is considered that built in 9-11th centuries.

== See also ==
- List of castles and fortresses in Azerbaijan
