= Jan Janszoon Struys =

Dutch explorer

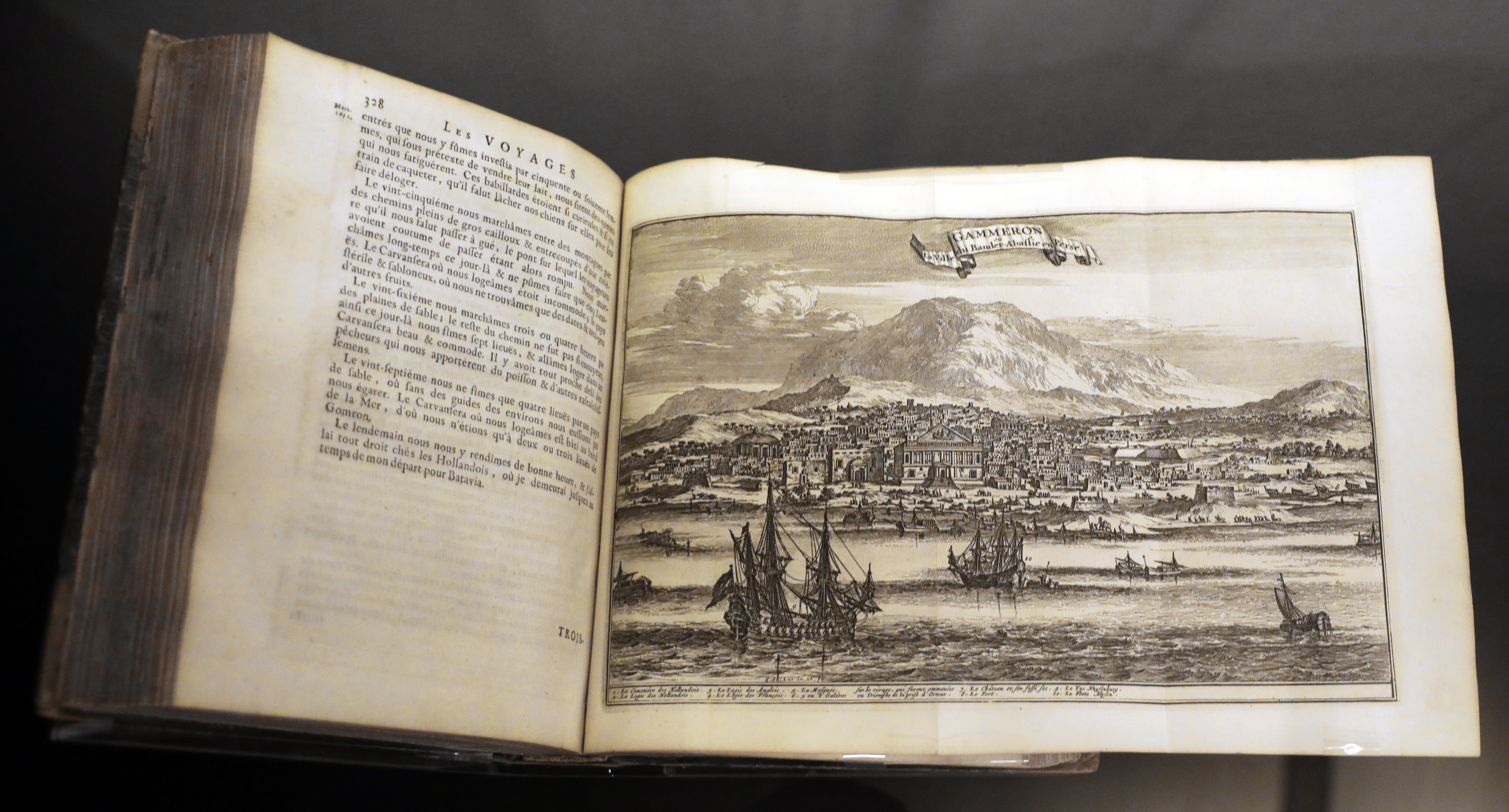
Les voyages..., by Jan Janszoon Struys, edited in Amsterdam in 1681 (Doha, Museum of Islamic Art)

Jan Janszoon Struys (1630–1694) was a Dutch sailor and sailmaker whose account of his world travels was published in Amsterdam in 1676 under the title Drie aanmerkelijke en seer rampspoedige reysen (published in English in 1683 as The perillous and most unhappy voyages of John Struys). Struys was most likely illiterate and the book was produced with the help of a ghostwriter, but the publishers deemed it more profitable to have Struys on the title page as an author. The book indeed became a bestseller, and is also of worth in assessing events and customs outside Western Europe, including Russia and parts Asia, and gives insight into marketing strategies in the publishing industry of the late 17th century.

== Background ==
Struys was born c. 1630 in the Zaan district of the province of North Holland, either in the town of Wormer or the village Durgerdam. He received an elementary education and was trained as a sailmaker.

The perillous and most unhappy voyages recounts Struys's travels: to Asia between 1647 and 1651, in the Mediterranean (in Venetian service, fighting the Ottoman Empire) between 1656 and 1657, to the Caspian Sea in Russian service in 1668, and to the East (Batavia, Dutch East Indies) in 1672–1673. The book was a bestseller and was translated in various European languages, and made Jan Struys famous. A French version (in three volumes) appeared in Amsterdam in 1681. The book was translated in German a number of times, including in 1678 (by Van Meurs in Amsterdam) and, abridged, in Zurich in 1679, when travel adventures set in Asia were popular among German readers. A translation in English appeared in 1683, at a time when the tourism industry for the wealthy began.

In The perillous and most unhappy voyages, Struys's youth is not described and we meet Struys only at age 17; no details are provided for the decade he spent in the Netherlands between the second and third voyage. While these omissions, coupled with a lack of consistency in style, might provide evidence for the author's low literacy (as a sailor he would not be expected to be literate, and documentary evidence from marriage records proves his illiteracy), according to historian Kees Boterbloem they actually suggest a specific marketing strategy: an unnamed ghostwriter producing a text based on the adventures of a lower-class, illiterate, but experienced traveler.

Struys interacted with many notable people and writers in the Netherlands. For example, he was acquainted with Nicolaes Witsen, the burgomaster of Amsterdam, who "highly appreciated the various observations made by Struys". In the last years of his life, Struys resided in Dithmarschen near Hamburg. He went to visit friends in Amsterdam on 28 May 1693, the last time he was in that city. By that point, he was already an old man. He returned to Dithmarschen and died there in 1694.

== General references ==
- Floor, Willem (1993). "Fact or Fiction: The Most Perrilous Journeys of Jan Jansz. Struys". In Calmard, Jean (ed.). Études safavides. Bibliothéque Iranienne 39. Paris and Tehran: Institut Francais de Recherche en Iran. pp. 57–68.
- Nationaal Archief, VOC, 1274 and 1279.
- Struys, Jan Janszoon (1974). De schriklijke reis van Jan Jansz. Struys, 1668–1673 [The Terrifying Journey of Jan Jansz. Struys, 1668–1673] (in Dutch). Retold by D. J. Douwes. Zaandijk: Klaas Woudt. ISBN 90-6183-012-5.
- Struys, Jan (2014). Boterbloem, Kees (ed.). Rampspoedige reizen door Rusland en Perzië in de zeventiende eeuw [Disastrous journeys through Russia and Persia in the seventeenth century] (PDF) (in Dutch). Amsterdam: Panchaud. ISBN 978-90-820779-3-3. Annotated edition with modernized spelling and other textual changes.
