= Ismayilli =

Ismayilli İsmayıllı
- City & Municipality
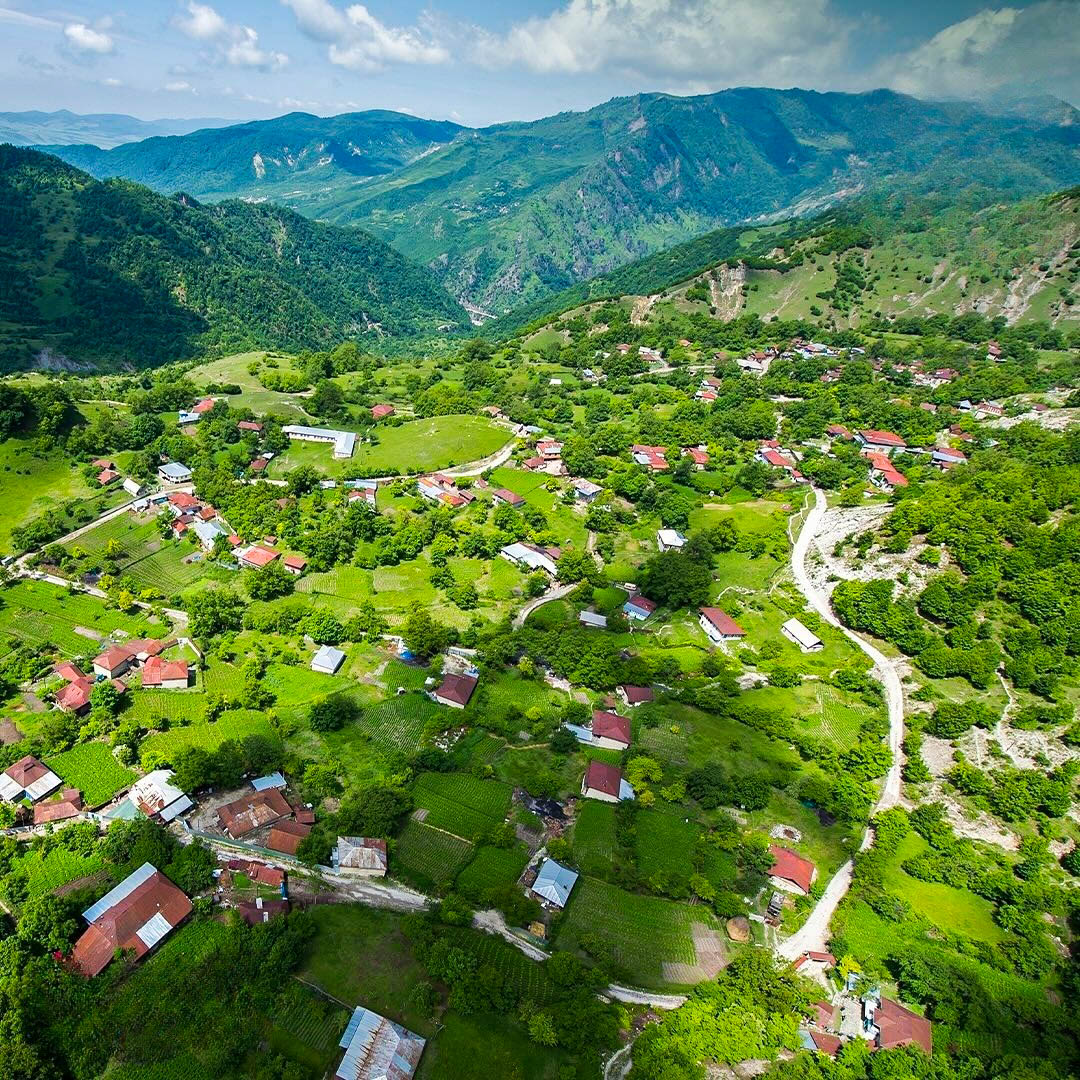

- Location within Azerbaijan
- Coordinates: 40°47′24″N 48°09′07″E
- Country: Azerbaijan
- District: Ismayilli
- Established: 1931

Government
  - Head of Executive Power: Nihad Bagirov
- Elevation: 657 m (2,156 ft)

Population (2021)
  - Total: 28,776
- Time zone: UTC+4 (AZT)
- Area code: +994 178
- Website: ismayilli-ih.gov.az

Ismayilli (Azerbaijani: İsmayıllı) is a city and the capital of the Ismayilli District of Azerbaijan. It has a population of 28,776 in 2021

== History ==
The territory of the district was part of the Albania state, which was formed in the late 4th century and early 3rd century BC, long before it was erected. Historical facts prove that Mehranis, who belonged to Javanshir, had created Girdiman's prince in Ismayilli territory. Javanshir was of this generation. There is a fortress called Javanshir on the coast of Akchay, 4 km north of the village of Talantan. Ismayilli district, located in the northeastern part of Azerbaijan, was founded in 1931. At first, the administrative centre of the district was in the Basgal village and was soon transferred to Ismayilli village. Until the district was organized, a large part of its territory was part of the Goychay district, part of the Shamakhi district, and a small part of Sheki's district. Ismayilli was the village until 1959, until 1967, it was a city-type settlement, and then it was renamed the city. Ismayilli region was established on November 24, 1931. From 1939 to 1977 the executive committee of the Soviet Union of deputies of the Ismayilli district, acting as the Executive Committee of the Council of People's Deputies of Ismayilli region from October 7, 1977, till October 17, 1991. In accordance with the Decree of the President of the Republic of Azerbaijan dated October 18, 1991, the Soviet of People's Deputies of Ismayilli was abolished, and the Ismayilli Executive Authority was established and functioned since November 1991.

== Politics and economy ==
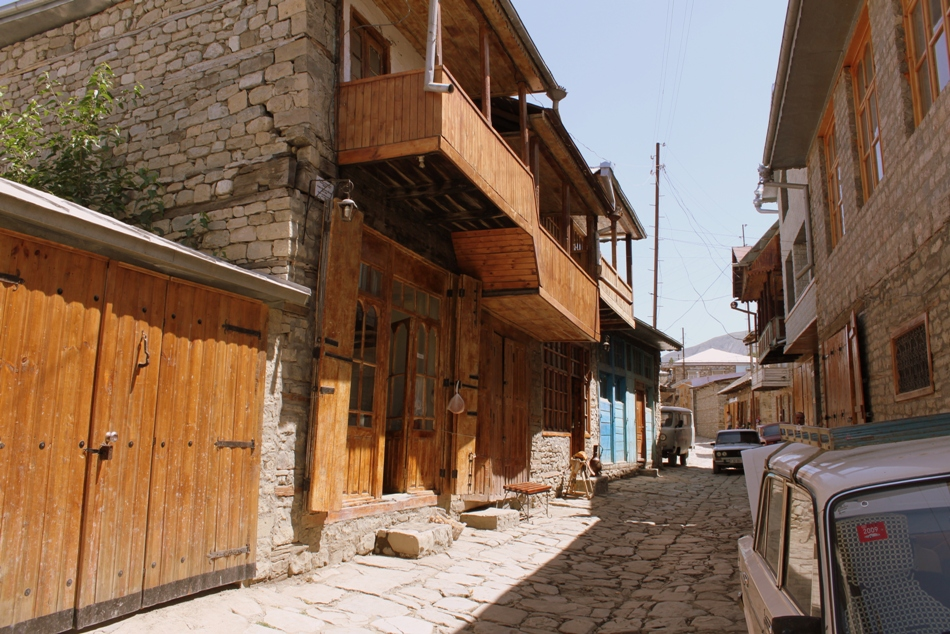
Lahıc, Ismailli

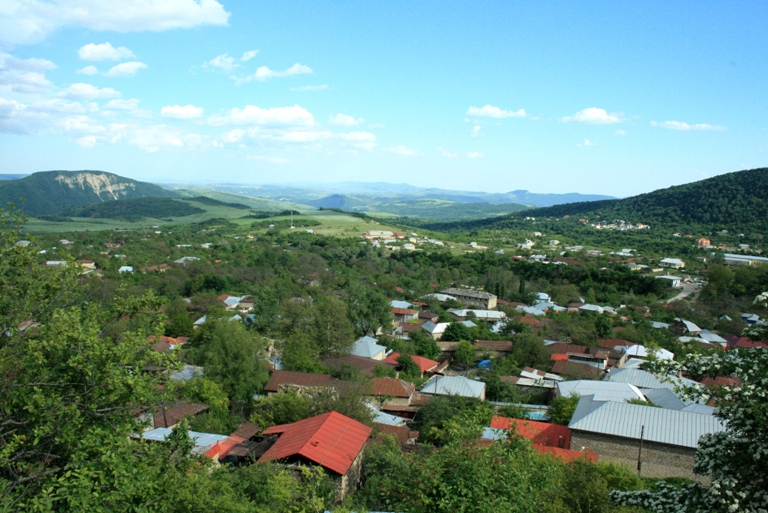
Basqal

The political and economic life of Ismayilli is dominated by local representatives and clients of the Azerbaijani strongman Ilham Aliyev such as the local governor of Ismayilli District Nizami Alakbarov. In January 2013 rioting broke out after a client of the ruling party from Baku became involved in a fight with a local taxi driver after a traffic accident. The businessman from Baku owned a hotel rumoured to contain a brothel controlled by Governor Nizami Alakbarov. A mob of several thousand local citizens defended the driver, rioted, burned the hotel and attacked the residences of the governor and his son. Police fought back with water cannons and scores were arrested.

=== Enterprises ===
There are enterprises such as light and food industries, asphalt plant in Ismayilli. There has been found and obtained granite in the mountains near Ismayilli. The district has strong agriculture. A kolkhoz named after Kalinin and located in Ivanovka village is famous for its achievements and has broad fame beyond the borders of Azerbaijan.

The first locally produced bicycles, ISMA Bikes, were presented in Baku. The Ismayilli-based bicycle plant offers a fairly wide range of products.

“Azerbaijan Coca-Cola Bottlers” LLC's new production facility opened in Ismayilli. 26 May 2025.

- A poultry factory was constructed in 1978. Its territory is 9.7 ha. In 1986, its activity was stopped. Since 2004, it is functioning as a private-sector enterprise that produces hen sausage. At present, there are 60 thousand birds. Working personnel consists of 75 people. It is planned to expand the total number of birds up to 150-200 thousand and the working personnel up to 150 people.
- Brake factory “Ragub FK” was constructed in 1989. Its territory is 2 ha. In 1993, the factory's activity was stopped, but since 2004 the factory is functioning as a private enterprise. The productive power of the factory is equal to 6 million units of the product per year. Working personnel consists of 90 employees.
- Production enterprise of Lahij is a state enterprise being at “Azerkhalcha” productive union's disposal. It is functioning since 1966. Its territory is 3300 km^{2} and 103 employees work there. The enterprise produces 450–500 km^{2} of carpet per year.
- Lahij enterprise which produces carpets is a state enterprise being at “Azerkhalcha” productive union's disposal. It began its activity in 1984. In 2001, the enterprise's activity was stopped, but in 2004 its activity was re-established. 72 employees work at the enterprise, which produces 300–350 thousand km² of carpet per annum. Its territory is 1 ha.
- “Sharab No. 1” was built in 1930. Till 1966 it functioned as a wine factory using 10 thousand tonnes of grapes per annum. Since 2003, the factory is functioning as a private enterprise and produces wine and cognac.

Besides that, there is a workshop producing kelaghayi (national headscarf) in Basgal, pharmaceutical LLC “Shafa-T”, four milk enterprises, a workshop producing table water, some private carpet weaving workshops and also some little and middle enterprises in Ismayilli.

== Twin towns ==
Ismayilli is twinned with:

- Itō, Japan
- Kiryat Bialik, Israel
- Nyasvizh, Belarus
