= Gulustan Fortress =

Gulustan fortress
- Azerbaijani: Gülüstan qalası
- Location within Azerbaijan

General information
- Type: Fortress
- Architectural style: Architectural school of Arran
- Location: Gulustan, Goranboy, Azerbaijan
- Coordinates: 40.347384°N 46.562229°E
- Completed: XII-XVII century

Technical details
- Material: Stone

Gulustan fortress is an ancient Armenian fortress in Goranboy region of Azerbaijan.

== Location ==
The fortress is located at the foothills of Murovdag, bordering Agdere and Goranboy regions. It is encircled by precipice from eastern, western and southwestern sides, forest from the north side, and slope from the south-eastside. The fortress is situated on the coast of Incechay, at a height of 1700 m above sea level and 200–250 m above the nearby territory. The way to the fortress is from south-east. The length of the fortress is 200–250 m in the east–west direction and 20–25 m in the north–south direction. The width of the wall is 0.8–0.9 m in the north and west, and in the south wall it is 1.5 m. It is reported that there is also a secret road leading to the river.

== History ==
The name of the fortress, "Gulustan" is a Persian word, meaning "flower garden". Gulustan was the residence Armenian noble house of Beglaryan, who were rule Armenian Principality of Gulustan. Also, the significant historic Treaty of Gulistan was signed in this fortress.

== See also ==
- Architecture of Azerbaijan
- Armenian architecture
