= Çaylı =

Çaylı or Chayli is a Turkish and Azeri place name meaning "place with tea [plants]" and may refer to several places:

== Azerbaijan ==
- Çaylı Kommuna
- Çaylı, Bilasuvar
- Çaylı, Goygol
- Çaylı, Hajigabul
- Çaylı, Qazakh
- Çaylı (Chayly Pervyye), Shamakhi
- Çaylı (Chayly Vtoryye), Shamakhi
- Çaylı, Shamkir
- Çaylı, Tartar

== Iran ==
- Chayli, Iran, a village in Golestan Province

== Turkey ==
- Çaylı, Adıyaman, a village in the Adıyaman district, Adıyaman Province
- Çaylı, Çerkeş
- Çaylı, İliç
- Çaylı, İzmir, a town in Ödemiş district, İzmir Province
- Çaylı, Nazilli, a village in the Nazilli district, Aydın Province
- Çaylı, Nilüfer
- Çaylı, Tefenni
- Çaylı, Yüreğir, a village in the Yüreğir district, Adana Province

== See also ==
- Chaylu (disambiguation)
