= Əliabad =

Əliabad may refer to:

- Əliabad, Bilasuvar, Azerbaijan
- Əliabad, Jalilabad, Azerbaijan
- Əliabad, Lerik:
  - Əliabad (38° 41' N 48° 33' E), Lerik, Azerbaijan
  - Əliabad (38° 50' N 48° 37' E), Lerik, Azerbaijan
- Əliabad, Nakhchivan, Azerbaijan
- Əliabad, Saatly, Azerbaijan
- Əliabad, Zaqatala, Azerbaijan

== See also ==
- Aliabad, Azerbaijan (disambiguation)
