= Aliabad, Azerbaijan =

Aliabad, Azerbaijan may refer to:

- Aliabad, Bilasuvar, Azerbaijan
- Aliabad, Jalilabad, Azerbaijan
- Əliabad, Lerik:
  - Aliabad (38° 41' N 48° 33' E), Lerik, Azerbaijan
  - Aliabad (38° 50' N 48° 37' E), Lerik, Azerbaijan
- Aliabad, Nakhchivan, Azerbaijan
- Aliabad, Saatly, Azerbaijan
- Aliabad, Zaqatala, Azerbaijan
