= Kommuna, Russia =

Kommuna (Russian: Коммуна) is the name of several rural localities in Russia:

- Kommuna, Vladimir Oblast, a rural locality (a village) in Muromsky District, Vladimir Oblast, Russia
- Kommuna, Voronezh Oblast, a rural locality (a settlement) in Mozhayskoye Rural Settlement, Kashirsky District, Voronezh Oblast, Russia
- Kommuna, Permsky District, Perm Krai, a rural locality (a village) in Zabolotskoye Rural Settlement, Permsky District, Perm Krai, Russia
- Kommuna, Gunibsky District, Republic of Dagestan, a rural locality (a selo) in Chokhsky Selsoviet, Gunibsky District, Republic of Dagestan, Russia
