= Chaylu =

Chaylu or Ch’aylu may refer to:

- Çaylı, Tartar, Azerbaijan
- Nerkin Chaylu, Azerbaijan
- Chaylu, Iran, a village in Golestan Province, Iran

== See also ==
- Chayli (disambiguation)
