= Kommuna =

Kommuna may refer to:

- The term for municipality (commune) in the Faroe Islands (and, similarly, a kommun in Sweden and kommune in Germany, Norway or Denmark)
- Kommuna, Qazax, a village and municipality in the Qazakh Rayon, Azerbaijan
- Kommuna, Russia, several rural localities in Russia
- Kommuna, a Russian rescue ship

== See also ==
- Kommune (disambiguation)
- Komuna (disambiguation)
