= Biləsuvar (disambiguation) =

Biləsuvar may refer to

- Biləsuvar, the capital city of Bilasuvar Rayon in Azerbaijan
- Biləsuvar (village), a village in the Bilasuvar Rayon of Azerbaijan
- Bilasuvar District, a rayon in Azerbaijan
- Bilasavar, the capital city of Bileh Savar County in Ardabil Province, Iran
