= Mubariz Ibrahimov =

Azerbaijani Warrant Officer and National Hero of Azerbaijan

- Mübariz Ağakərim oğlu İbrahimov
- Born: February 7, 1988; Əliabad, Bilasuvar Rayon, Azerbaijan SSR, Soviet Union
- Died: June 18, 2010 (aged 22); Çaylı, Tartar Rayon, Azerbaijan
- Military career
- Allegiance: Azerbaijan
- Branch: Azerbaijani Land Forces
- Service years: 2007–2010
- Rank: Warrant Officer
- Commands: Aghdam Detachment
- Conflicts: 2010 Mardakert skirmish
- Awards: National Hero of Azerbaijan; 2010

Mubariz Aghakerim oğlu Ibrahimov (Azerbaijani: Mübariz Ağakərim oğlu İbrahimov; February 7, 1988, in Əliabad – June 18, 2010, in Çaylı) was an Azerbaijani Warrant Officer and National Hero of Azerbaijan.

== Early years ==
Mubariz Ibrahimov, was born in Aliabad, Bilasuvar District. After completing his secondary education in 2005, Ibrahimov was conscripted to Azerbaijani Armed Forces serving from 2006 through 2007. In September 2009, he entered the courses for warrants, after which he served in Naftalan.

== Death ==
On June 19, Ibrahimov was killed in a shootout along the frontline between Azerbaijani and Armenian forces. The Azerbaijani government posthumously granted him the title of National Hero of Azerbaijan. An Azerbaijani Defense Ministry press release said "The Armenian side took Mubariz Ibrahimov's body and has not returned it." Armenia stated that Ibrahimov was shot dead in Armenian-controlled territory, proving that the fighting was provoked by Azerbaijani forces.

== Body ==
Ibrahimov's body remained under Armenian control for 141 days. The spokesman of the Defense Ministry of Azerbaijan Teymour Abdullayev alleged that "Armenia repeatedly claimed that the soldier's body is not in their hand and they even didn’t abstain to mislead the international organizations". On August 2, photos, which are claimed to be Ibrahimov's body, were placed on Internet by the Armenians. Azerbaijani authorities asked the International Committee of the Red Cross to mediate in returning Ibrahimov's body. Later the head of the Armenian Apostolic Church Karekin II asked the President of Armenia Serzh Sargsyan to return the body to Azerbaijan. Finally the body was returned to Azerbaijan on November 6 following the agreement reached by presidents of Armenia and Azerbaijan in Astrakhan in October 2010. Ibrahimov was buried at the second Alley of Honor in Baku. The funeral was attended by Azerbaijani President Ilham Aliyev.

== Legacy ==
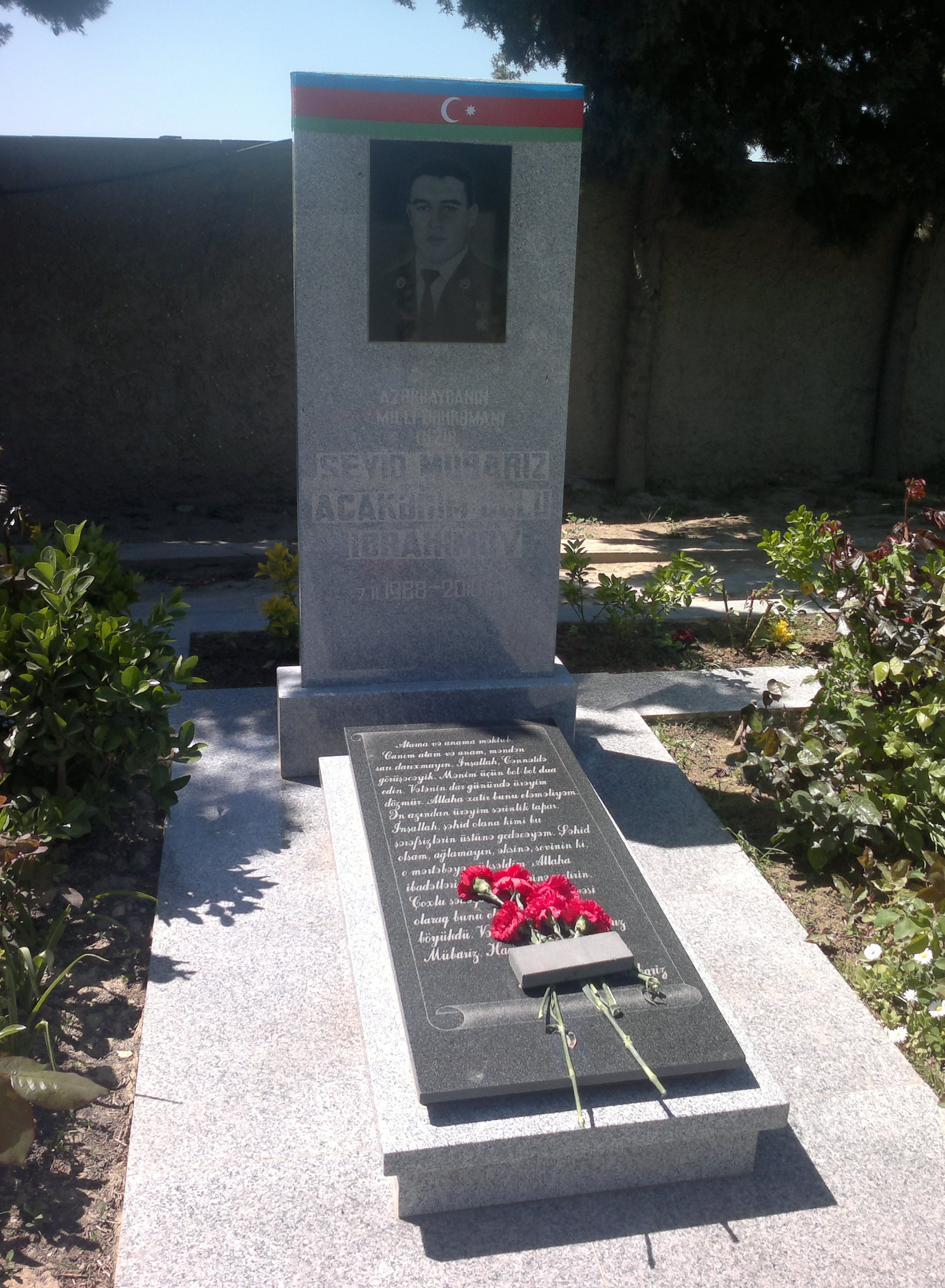
Grave of Mubariz Ibrahimov at the II Alley of Honor in Baku

On July 22, 2010, President Ilham Aliyev signed a decree that conferred Ibrahimov with the status of national hero. The Cabinet of Ministers is empowered to ensure the naming of one of the secondary schools of Bilesuvar after Mubariz Ibrahimov and the executive powers of Bilesuvar are empowered to ensure the naming of one of the streets after Mubariz Ibrahimov. A documentary about his life was also proposed by MP Ganira Pashayeva. On 15 June 2011, a four-meter tall granite statue of Mubariz Ibrahimov sponsored by Central Bank of Azerbaijan was unveiled in front of school named after him.

An armada class tanker in Turkey also bears his name.

The 12.7mm caliber Mubariz Istiglal sniper rifle is named after him.

He is also considered a National Hero in Turkey because of his bravery shown in battle.

== Awards and fellowships ==
- In 2011, he was named the Man of the Year by ANS Group of Companies.

== In popular culture ==
- The Turkish television series Sakarya Fırat has made several references to Ibrahimov.
- A ship named Mubariz İbrahimov in fleet of Turkish oil shipping company Palmali Group of Companies.

== See also ==
- Nagorno-Karabakh conflict
