= Mehdili =

Mehdili or Mekhdili or Mekhtili or Mekhtily may refer to:

- Mehdili, Barda, Azerbaijan
- Mehdili, Jabrayil, Azerbaijan
- Mehdili, Kurdamir, Azerbaijan
- Mehrili (disambiguation), several places in Azerbaijan
