= Qaraqocalı =

Qaraqocalı or Karagodzhaly or Karagadzhaly may refer to:

- Qaraqocalı, Kurdamir, Azerbaijan
- Qaraqocalı, Shamkir, Azerbaijan
