= Çaylı, Shamakhi =

Çaylı, Shamakhi may refer to:

- Çaylı (Chayly Pervyye), Shamakhi, Azerbaijan
- Çaylı (Chayly Vtoryye), Shamakhi, Azerbaijan
