= Cayli =

Cayli may refer to:

- Çaylı (disambiguation), places in Azerbaijan
- Cəyli, Azerbaijan
