= Buruk =

Buruk may refer to:

- Buruk, Sarıçam, a village in Adana Province, Turkey
- Okan Buruk, Turkish footballer
