= Dərvişli =

- Municipality
- Location within Azerbaijan
- Coordinates: 39°22′N 48°24′E
- Country: Azerbaijan
- Rayon: Bilasuvar

Population
  - Total: 1,374
- Time zone: UTC+4 (AZT)
  - Summer (DST): UTC+5 (AZT)

Dərvişli (also, Dovrushlu and Dervishli) is a village and municipality in the Bilasuvar Rayon of Azerbaijan. It has a population of 1,374.
