= Amankənd =

- Municipality
- Location within Azerbaijan
- Coordinates: 39°24′35″N 48°25′38″E
- Country: Azerbaijan
- Rayon: Bilasuvar

Population
  - Total: 3,245
- Time zone: UTC+4 (AZT)

Amankənd (also, Əmənkənd and Armen-Keno) is a village and municipality in the Bilasuvar Rayon of Azerbaijan. It has a population of 3,245.
