= Karayusuflu =

Karayusuflu (literally "place of black Yusuf") is a Turkic word that may refer to:

- Qarayusifli, a village and municipality of Barda Rayon, Azerbaijan
- Karayusuflu, Karaisalı, a village in the district of Karaisalı, Adana Province, Turkey
- Karayusuflu, Seyhan, a village in the district of Seyhan, Adana Province, Turkey
- Karayusuflu, Yüreğir, a village in the district of Yüreğir, Adana Province, Turkey
