= Arazbarı =

Coordinates: 39°59′N 47°09′E

Arazbarı is a village and municipality in the Bilasuvar Rayon of Azerbaijan. It has a population of 387.
