= Ovçubərə =

- Location within Azerbaijan
- Coordinates: 39°22′00″N 48°37′30″E
- Country: Azerbaijan
- Rayon: Bilasuvar

Population
  - Total: 1,595
- Time zone: UTC+4 (AZT)
  - Summer (DST): UTC+5 (AZT)

Ovçubərə (or Ovçudərə, known as Kulibinka until 1998) is a village and municipality in the Bilasuvar Rayon of Azerbaijan. It has a population of 1,595.
