= Ağayrı =

- Municipality
- Location within Azerbaijan
- Coordinates: 39°31′30″N 48°29′43″E
- Country: Azerbaijan
- Rayon: Bilasuvar

Population
  - Total: 2,187
- Time zone: UTC+4 (AZT)

Ağayrı (also, Ağəyri, Ağayri, and Agayry) is a village and municipality in the Bilasuvar Rayon of Azerbaijan. It has a population of 2,187.
