= Göğebakan =

Turkish surname

Göğebakan (Turkish for "skygazer") is a Turkish surname formed by the combination of the Turkish words gök ("sky") and bakan ("onlooking"). Notable people with the name include:

- Emine Göğebakan (born 2001), Turkish taekwondo athlete
- Murat Göğebakan (1968–2014), Turkish singer
