= Mehrili =

Mehrili may refer to:

- Mehrili, Qubadli, Azerbaijan
- Mehrili, Shamkir, Azerbaijan
