= Gyullu =

- Location within Azerbaijan
- Coordinates: 39°23′N 48°29′E
- Country: Azerbaijan
- Rayon: Bilasuvar
- Time zone: UTC+4 (AZT)
  - Summer (DST): UTC+5 (AZT)

Gyullu is a village in the Bilasuvar rayon of Azerbaijan.
