= Hürriyet, Sarıçam =

Hürriyet
- Neighbourhood
- Location in Turkey
- Coordinates: 36.9897°N 35.4361°E
- Country: Turkey
- Province: Adana
- District: Sarıçam
- Population (2022): 3,765
- Time zone: UTC+3 (TRT)

Hürriyet is a neighbourhood in the municipality and district of Sarıçam, Adana Province, Turkey. Its population is 3,765 (2022). It is the western part of the former municipality of İncirlik, which became part of Sarıçam in 2008.
