= Murat Göğebakan =

Turkish rock and Anadolu rock Singer (1968-2014)

- Born: Murat Göğebakan; 9 October 1968; Buruk Cumhuriyet, Sarıçam
- Died: 31 July 2014 (aged 45); Medipol Mega University, Bağcılar, Istanbul
- Resting place: Buruk Cemetery, Sarıçam
- Other names: Ağabey; Sevgi Adamı
- Occupations: musician; composer; songwriter; guitarist
- Spouse: Sema Bekmez (m. 2000; div. 2011)
- Children: 1
- Musical career
- Genres: Folk rock; psychedelic folk; Anatolian rock
- Instruments: electric guitar; bass guitar
- Years active: 1995–2014
- Labels: Prestij Music (1997); Sindoma Music (1998–2001); Özbir Music (2002–2004); Mediaworx Productions (2005–2009); Çınar Music (2010–2014)
- Website: muratgogebakan.com.tr

Murat Göğebakan (October 9, 1968 – July 31, 2014), was a Turkish Anatolian rock musician, artist and composer.

== Early years ==
He was born on October 9, 1968, in Sarıçam. His father was from Darende, Malatya, and his mother was from Nizip, Gaziantep, Since his parents were working in Dresden, Germany, he lived between Adana and Germany until he was 7 years old. he completed his primary, secondary, and high school education in Adana. Then he entered Hacettepe University Ankara State Conservatory in 1986. After completing his university education, he took up work as a lecturer at Çukurova University. During these years, he studied dargah, gave guitar lessons, and worked in a bar. He lived in Adana until 1995.

== Career ==
Murat Göğebakan, who came to Istanbul in 1995 where he received an album offer from the label Prestij Music of Hilmi Topaloğlu. In 1997, he released his album "Ben Sana Aşık Oldum" from this company. He shot a music video for the songs "Ben Sana Aşık Oldum, Kara Gözlüm, Öyle ki Hasretimsin". Murat Gogebakan was nominated in the categories of "song of the year", "best lyrics", "best composition", "best rock music" and "best newcomer" at the Kral Turkey Music Awards ceremony organized by Kral TV. He received the Best Breakthrough Male Artist award.

== Death ==
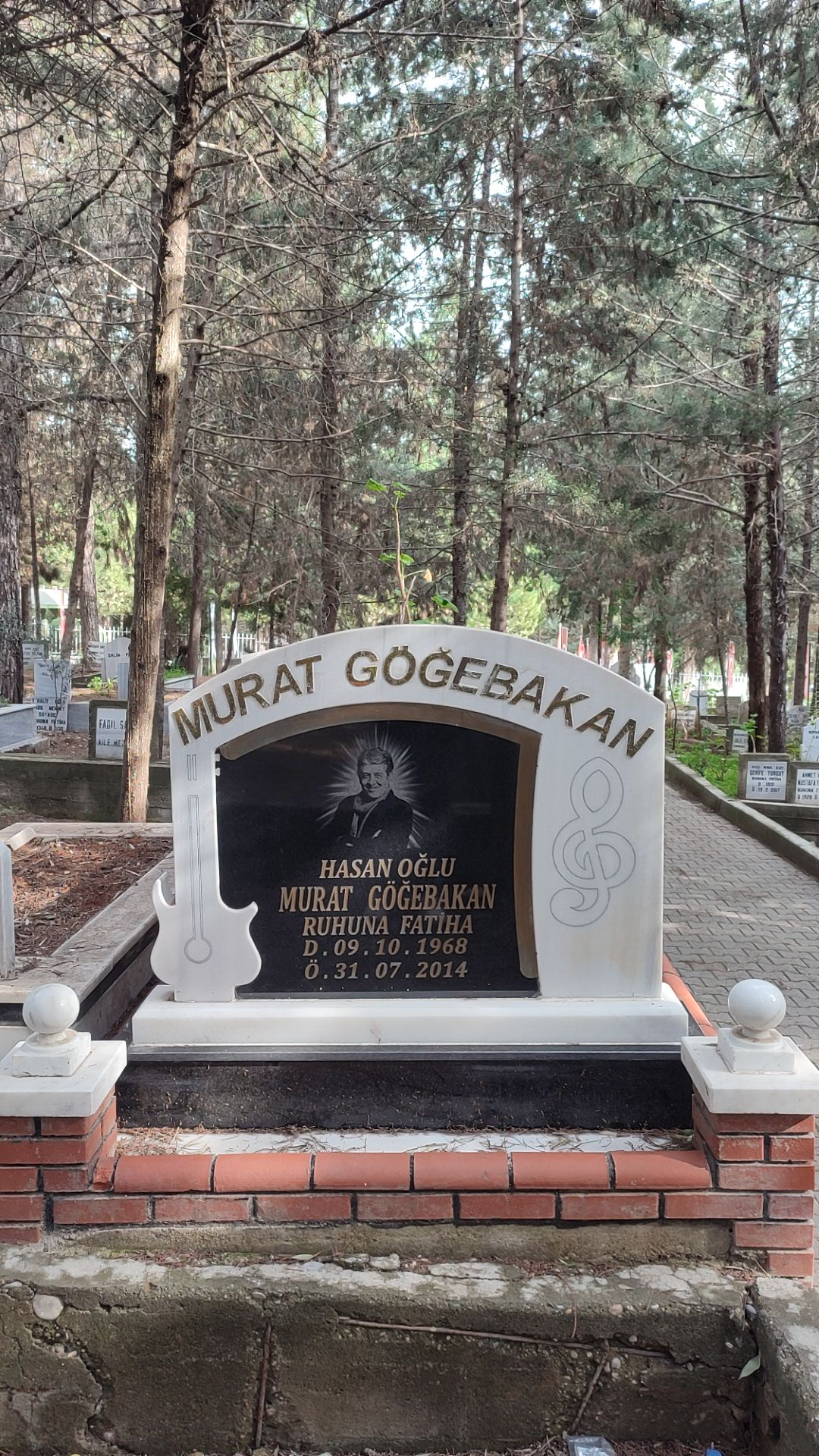
The grave of Murat Göğebakan in the Sarıçam district of Adana, Buruk Cemetery

Göğebakan, who has been treated for cancer (leukemia) for a long time; died in July 31 2014 in Bağcılar Medipol Mega University hospital. Göğebakan's body was buried in the Buruk Cemetery in the Sarıçam district of Adana, after the prayer at the Fatih Mosque.

== Discography ==
- Ben Sana Aşık Oldum (1997)
- Sen Rahatına Bak (1998)
- Tek Suçum Seni Sevmekmiş (1999)
- Merhaba (2000)
- Sindomax (2000)
- Ayyüzlüm (2002)
- Yaralı (2004)
- Aynı Mahallenin Çocukları (2004)
- Sana Olan Aşkım Şahit (2005)
- Geçmişten Geleceğe Yunus Emre (2005)
- Sevgiliye (2007)
- Bahar (2007)
- Aşıklar Yolu (2010)
- Aşkın Gözyaşları (2012)
