= Ahmadagha Mughanly =

Azerbaijani writer

- Əhmədağa Muğanlı
- Born: May 10, 1926; Aliabad, Javad uezd, Azerbaijan SSR, TSFSR, USSR
- Died: August 4, 2001 (aged 75); Baku, Azerbaijan
- Occupation: writer
- Awards: Honored Culture Worker of the Azerbaijan SSR Azerbaijan SSR State Award

Ahmadagha Akbar oghlu Gurbanov (Azerbaijani: Əhmədağa Əkbər oğlu Qurbanov, May 10, 1926 – August 4, 2001) was an Azerbaijani writer, screenwriter, a member of the Union of Azerbaijani Writers, a member of the Cinematographers' Union, a laureate of the State Prize of the Azerbaijan SSR (1986), an Honored Worker of Culture (1991).

== Biography ==
Ahmadagha Mughanli was born on May 10, 1926, in Aliabad village. He studied at the Faculty of Philology of Azerbaijan State University (1947–1952).

He started his literary activity with the story "Biz qol çəkirik ki…" published in the magazine "İnqilab və mədəniyyət". After that, he appeared in periodicals from time to time. He is the scriptwriter of about 20 documentaries and feature films.

He was a literary worker in the editorial office of "Baku Communist" newspaper. Then he worked at the "Azerbaijanfilm" film studio, named after Jafar Jabbarly. He worked here as the editor of the script department, the editor-in-chief of the association of documentary-chronicle and scientific-mass films (since 1953). He was a member of the script-editing board at the film studio. He was repeatedly elected as a deputy of the October District Council of People's Deputies of Baku (1969–1971).

He died on August 4, 2001, in Baku.

== Awards ==
- Azerbaijan SSR State Award – April 26, 1986
- Honored Culture Worker of the Azerbaijan SSR – 1991
