= Komuna =

Komuna may refer to:

- Komuna or komunë ("commune"), a former Albanian administrative division
- Komuna (journal), a Czech anarchist journal in the early 20th century
- Komuna (company), a Serbian record label and media production company established in 1985 and headquartered in Belgrade

== See also ==
- Komunë, a administrative division
- Kommune (disambiguation)
