= Yuxarı Ağalı =

Village in Azerbaijan

Coordinates: 39.42533°N 48.45383°E

Yuxarı Ağalı is a village and municipality in the Bilasuvar Rayon of Azerbaijan. It has a population of 1000.
