= Kemalpaşa, Sarıçam =

Kemalpaşa
- Neighbourhood
- Location in Turkey
- Coordinates: 36°59′35″N 35°26′24″E
- Country: Turkey
- Province: Adana
- District: Sarıçam
- Population (2022): 5,714
- Time zone: UTC+3 (TRT)

Kemalpaşa (also: Mustafa Kemal Paşa) is a neighbourhood in the municipality and district of Sarıçam, Adana Province, Turkey. Its population is 5,714 (2022). It is the central part of the former municipality of İncirlik, which became part of Sarıçam in 2008.
