= Cihadiye, Sarıçam =

Cihadiye
- Neighbourhood
- Location in Turkey
- Coordinates: 37°3′3″N 35°33′46″E
- Country: Turkey
- Province: Adana
- District: Sarıçam
- Population (2022): 1,901
- Time zone: UTC+3 (TRT)

Cihadiye is a neighbourhood in the municipality and district of Sarıçam, Adana Province, Turkey. Its population is 1,901 (2022). Before 2008, it was part of the district of Yüreğir.
