= Eğeciuşağı, Sarıçam =

Eğeciuşağı
- Neighbourhood
- Location in Turkey
- Coordinates: 37°13′N 35°24′E
- Country: Turkey
- Province: Adana
- District: Sarıçam
- Population (2022): 216
- Time zone: UTC+3 (TRT)

Eğeciuşağı is a neighbourhood in the municipality and district of Sarıçam, Adana Province, Turkey. Its population is 216 (2022). Before 2008, it was part of the district of Yüreğir.
