= Dağcı, Sarıçam =

Dağcı
- Neighbourhood
- Location in Turkey
- Coordinates: 36°59′0″N 35°30′56″E
- Country: Turkey
- Province: Adana
- District: Sarıçam
- Population (2022): 4,115
- Time zone: UTC+3 (TRT)

Dağcı (formerly: Kürkçüler) is a neighbourhood in the municipality and district of Sarıçam, Adana Province, Turkey. Its population is 4,115 (2022). Before 2008, it was part of the district of Yüreğir.
