= Cerenli, Sarıçam =

Cerenli
- Neighbourhood
- Location in Turkey
- Coordinates: 37°13′N 35°32′E
- Country: Turkey
- Province: Adana
- District: Sarıçam
- Population (2022): 385
- Time zone: UTC+3 (TRT)

Cerenli is a neighbourhood in the municipality and district of Sarıçam, Adana Province, Turkey. Its population is 385 (2022). Before 2008, it was part of the district of Yüreğir.
