= Biləsuvar (village) =

- Location within Azerbaijan
- Coordinates: 39°22′57″N 48°22′29″E
- Country: Azerbaijan
- Rayon: Bilasuvar
- Time zone: UTC+4 (AZT)

Biləsuvar (also, Bilyasuvar, Belyasuvar, and Belayasuvar) is a village in the Bilasuvar Rayon of Azerbaijan.
