= Mustafalar, Sarıçam =

Mustafalar
- Neighbourhood
- Location in Turkey
- Coordinates: 37.1141°N 35.5111°E
- Country: Turkey
- Province: Adana
- District: Sarıçam
- Population (2022): 1,291
- Time zone: UTC+3 (TRT)

Mustafalar is a neighbourhood in the municipality and district of Sarıçam, Adana Province, Turkey. Its population is 1,291 (2022). Before 2008, it was part of the district of Yüreğir.
