= Aşağı Çaylı =

- Ashaghi Chayli; Ներքին Չայլու
- Location within Azerbaijan
- Coordinates: 40°20′05″N 46°50′14″E
- Country: Azerbaijan
- Rayon: Aghdara
- Time zone: UTC+4 (AZT)
- ISO 3166 code: AZE

Aşağı Çaylı (Ashaghi Chayli, Armenian: Ներքին Չայլու, romanized: Nerk’in Ch’aylu) is a former village on the territory of the current village of Chayli in the Aghdara Rayon of Azerbaijan.

According to the administrative divisions of Azerbaijan SSR for 1933, Ashaghi Chayli and Yukhari Chayli were registered within Yukhari Chayli selsoviet of the Autonomous Oblast of Nagorno-Karabakh of Azerbaijan SSR. The Autonomous Oblast of Nagorno-Karabakh was established in the 7th of July, 1923, and it was renamed to Nagorno-Karabakh Autonomous Oblast in 1936.

According to the administrative divisions of Azerbaijan SSR for 1977, Nerkin Chayli was mentioned as a village within Verin Chayli selsoviet of Mardakert District of Nagorno-Karabakh Autonomous Oblast of Azerbaijan SSR, and the village of Verin Chayli was a center of this selsoviet.

By the Decree of the Presidium of the Supreme Soviet of the Azerbaijan SSR of March 26, 1982, it was decided to assign the name Chayli to the merged villages of Verin Chayli and Nerkin Chayli and to rename the Verin-Chayli selsoviet to the Chayli selsoviet with its center in the village of Chayli.

On November 26, 1991, the Supreme Council of the Republic of Azerbaijan adopted the law "On the abolition of the Nagorno-Karabakh Autonomous Region of the Republic of Azerbaijan". In this law, in addition to the abolition of the Nagorno-Karabakh Autonomous Region (NKAO), it was also decided to rename the Mardakert District to the Aghdara District.

By the decision of the Milli Majlis of the Republic of Azerbaijan dated August 25, 1992, the Chayli selsoviet was transferred from the Aghdara District to the Tartar District. The Aghdara District was subsequently abolished by the decision of the Milli Majlis of the Republic of Azerbaijan dated October 13, 1992, and its territory was divided between the Aghdam, Kalbajar and Tartar Districts.

By the law of December 5, 2023, in connection with the re-establishment of the Aghdara District from parts of the Aghdam, Kalbajar and Tartar Districts, the Chayli rural administrative-territorial district, together with the Chayli village included in it, was transferred from the Tartar District to the Aghdara District. Currently, the village of Chayli is the center of the Chayli rural administrative-territorial district of the Aghdara District of Azerbaijan.
