= Bayramhacılı, Sarıçam =

Bayramhacılı
- Neighbourhood
- Location in Turkey
- Coordinates: 37.0905°N 35.3163°E
- Country: Turkey
- Province: Adana
- District: Sarıçam
- Population (2022): 579
- Time zone: UTC+3 (TRT)

Bayramhacılı is a neighbourhood in the municipality and district of Sarıçam, Adana Province, Turkey. Its population is 579 (2022). Before 2008, it was part of the district of Yüreğir.
