= Çaylı, Bilasuvar =

Çaylı
- Municipality
- Location within Azerbaijan
- Coordinates: 39°30′N 48°31′E
- Country: Azerbaijan
- Rayon: Bilasuvar

Population
  - Total: 1,968
- Time zone: UTC+4 (AZT)

Çaylı (known as Fioletovka until 2005) is a village and municipality in the Bilasuvar District of Azerbaijan. It has a population of 1,968.
