= Hasanbeyli, Sarıçam =

Hasanbeyli
- Neighbourhood
- Location in Turkey
- Coordinates: 37.0500°N 35.5333°E
- Country: Turkey
- Province: Adana
- District: Sarıçam
- Population (2022): 522
- Time zone: UTC+3 (TRT)

Hasanbeyli is a neighbourhood in the municipality and district of Sarıçam, Adana Province, Turkey. Its population is 522 (2022). Before 2008, it was part of the district of Yüreğir.
