= Kepeztepe, Sarıçam =

Kepeztepe
- Neighbourhood
- Location in Turkey
- Coordinates: 37°11′N 35°23′E
- Country: Turkey
- Province: Adana
- District: Sarıçam
- Population (2022): 449
- Time zone: UTC+3 (TRT)

Kepeztepe is a neighbourhood in the municipality and district of Sarıçam, Adana Province, Turkey. Its population is 449 (2022). Before 2008, it was part of the district of Yüreğir.
