= Çarkıpare, Sarıçam =

Çarkıpare
- Neighbourhood
- Location within Turkey
- Coordinates: 37.0681°N 35.3853°E
- Country: Turkey
- Province: Adana
- District: Sarıçam
- Population (2022): 8,805
- Time zone: UTC+3 (TRT)

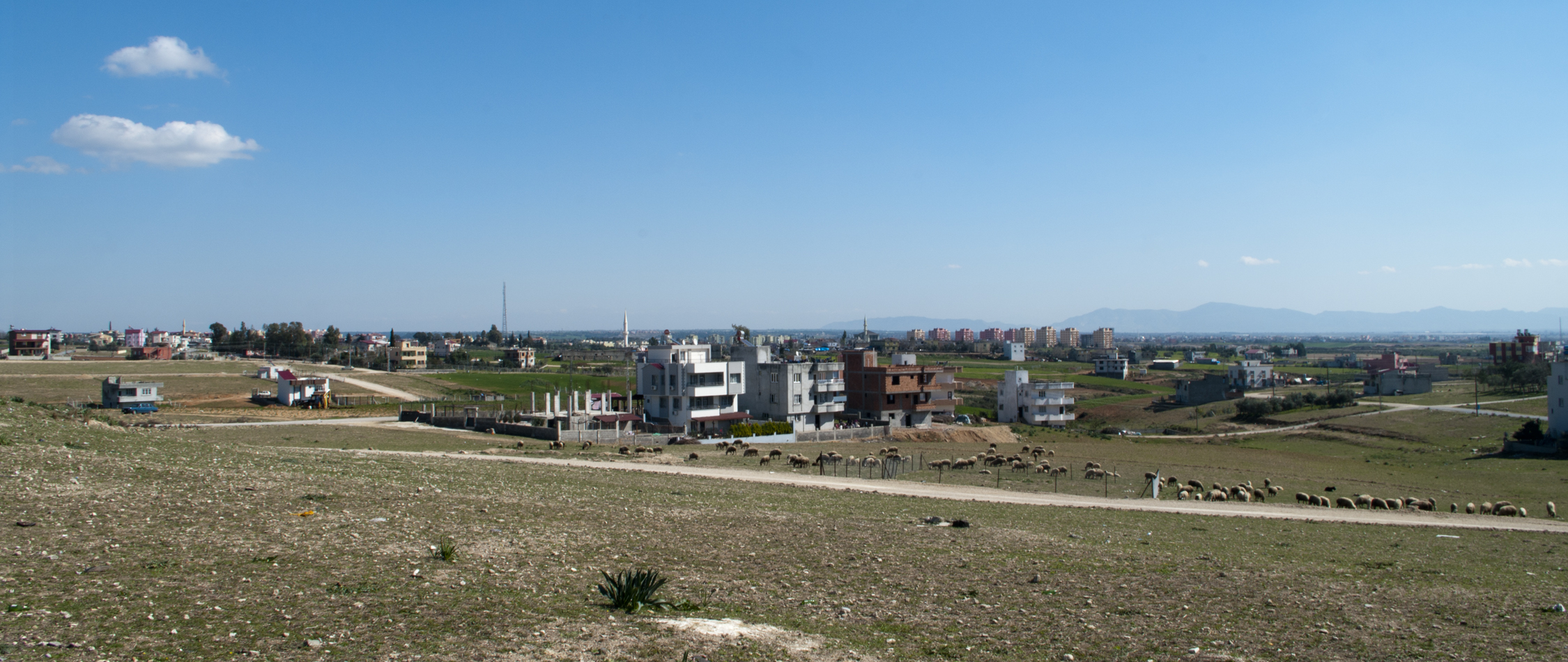
A partial view of Çarkıpare in Sarıçam, Adana

Çarkıpare is a neighbourhood in the municipality and district of Sarıçam, Adana Province, Turkey. Its population is 8,805 (2022). Before 2008, it was part of the district of Yüreğir.
