= Boynuyoğun, Sarıçam =

Boynuyoğun
- Neighbourhood
- Location in Turkey
- Coordinates: 37.0680°N 35.4113°E
- Country: Turkey
- Province: Adana
- District: Sarıçam
- Population (2022): 1,671
- Time zone: UTC+3 (TRT)

Boynuyoğun is a neighbourhood in the municipality and district of Sarıçam, Adana Province, Turkey. Its population is 1,671 (2022). Before 2008, it was part of the district of Yüreğir.
