= St. Astvatsatsin Church (Aliabad) =

Armenian church in Azerbaijan

- Սուրբ Աստվածածին եկեղեցի
- St. Astvatsatsin Church
- Location: Əliabad, Nakhchivan
- Country: Azerbaijan
- Denomination: Armenian Apostolic Church

History
- Founded: 17th century

Architecture
- Functional status: destroyed
- Demolished: 1997–2005

St. Astvatsatsin Church was an Armenian church located in the village of Aliabad of the Nakhchivan Autonomous Republic of Azerbaijan. The church was located in the central part of the village.

== History ==
The church was built in the 17th century and was renovated in 1887.

== Architecture ==
It was a basilica-style church with doorways in the northern and southern facades and a delicate polygonal dome that sat atop the cruciform roof. There were Armenian inscriptions on the southern facade.

== Destruction ==
The church was still extant in the late 1980s and it appears on the 1:10,000 scale Soviet topographic map of 1990. However, by March 12, 2005, the church had been erased, as documented by Caucasus Heritage Watch. An Alley of Martyrs has been constructed on its place.
