= Kılbaş, Sarıçam =

Kılbaş
- Neighbourhood
- Location in Turkey
- Coordinates: 37°09′N 35°20′E
- Country: Turkey
- Province: Adana
- District: Sarıçam
- Population (2022): 219
- Time zone: UTC+3 (TRT)

Kılbaş is a neighbourhood in the municipality and district of Sarıçam, Adana Province, Turkey. Its population is 219 (2022). Before 2008, it was part of the district of Yüreğir.
