= Boztepe, Sarıçam =

Boztepe
- Neighbourhood
- Location in Turkey
- Coordinates: 37.2201°N 35.4882°E
- Country: Turkey
- Province: Adana
- District: Sarıçam
- Population (2022): 588
- Time zone: UTC+3 (TRT)

Boztepe is a neighbourhood in the municipality and district of Sarıçam, Adana Province, Turkey. Its population is 588 (2022). Before 2008, it was part of the district of Yüreğir.
