= Yağızlar, Sarıçam =

Yağızlar
- Neighbourhood
- Country: Turkey
- Province: Adana
- District: Sarıçam
- Population (2022): 812
- Time zone: UTC+3 (TRT)

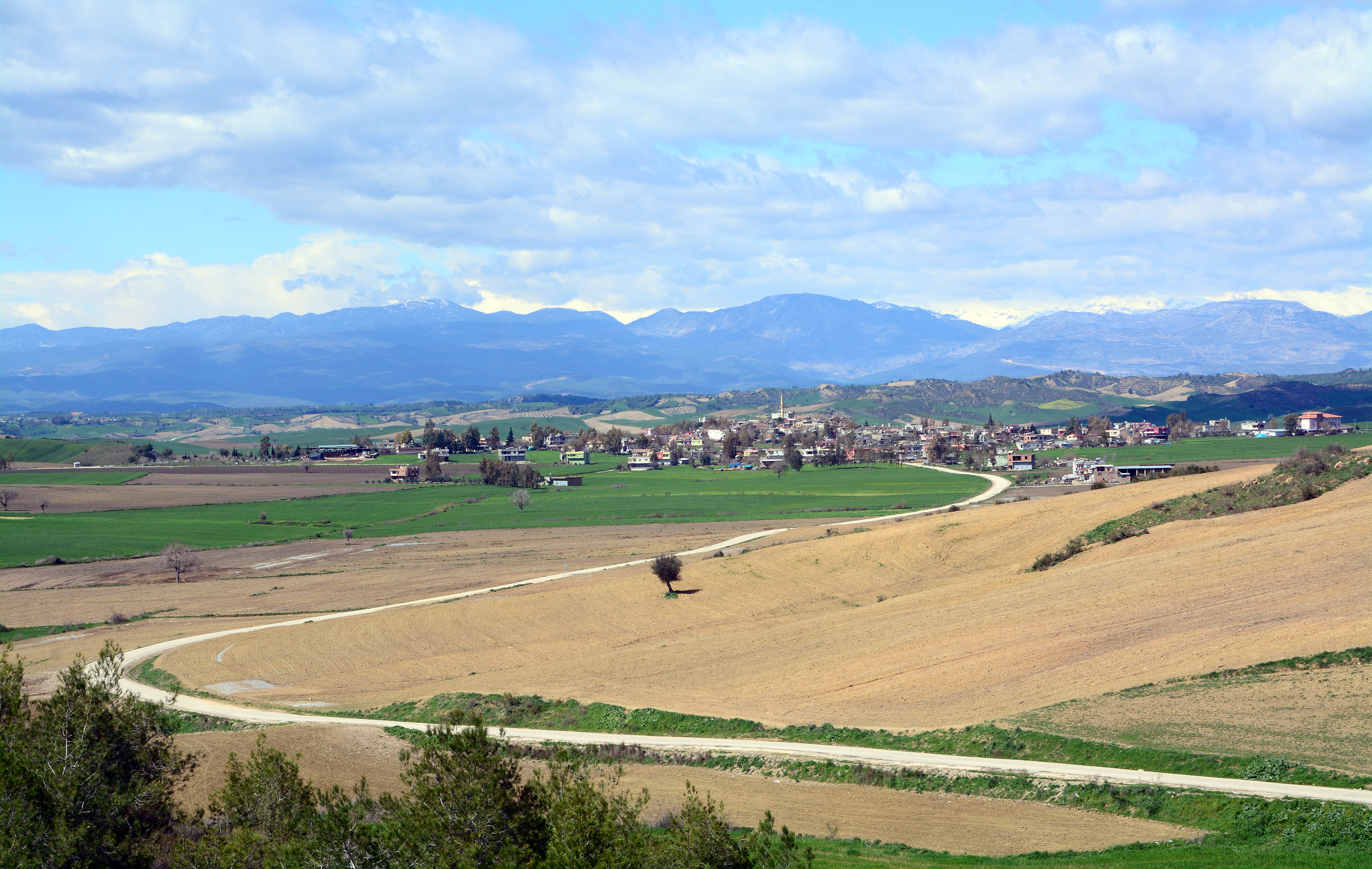
Picture of a field in Yağızlar Sarıçam

Yağızlar is a neighbourhood in the municipality and district of Sarıçam, Adana Province, Turkey. Its population is 812 (2022). Before 2008, it was part of the district of Yüreğir.
