= Büyük Baklalı, Sarıçam =

Büyük Baklalı
- Neighbourhood
- Location in Turkey
- Coordinates: 37.0357°N 35.6319°E
- Country: Turkey
- Province: Adana
- District: Sarıçam
- Population (2022): 847
- Time zone: UTC+3 (TRT)

Büyük Baklalı is a neighbourhood in the municipality and district of Sarıçam, Adana Province, Turkey. Its population is 847 (2022). Before 2008, it was part of the district of Yüreğir.
