= Hocalı, Sarıçam =

Hocalı
- Neighbourhood
- Location in Turkey
- Coordinates: 37°09′N 35°25′E
- Country: Turkey
- Province: Adana
- District: Sarıçam
- Population (2022): 449
- Time zone: UTC+3 (TRT)

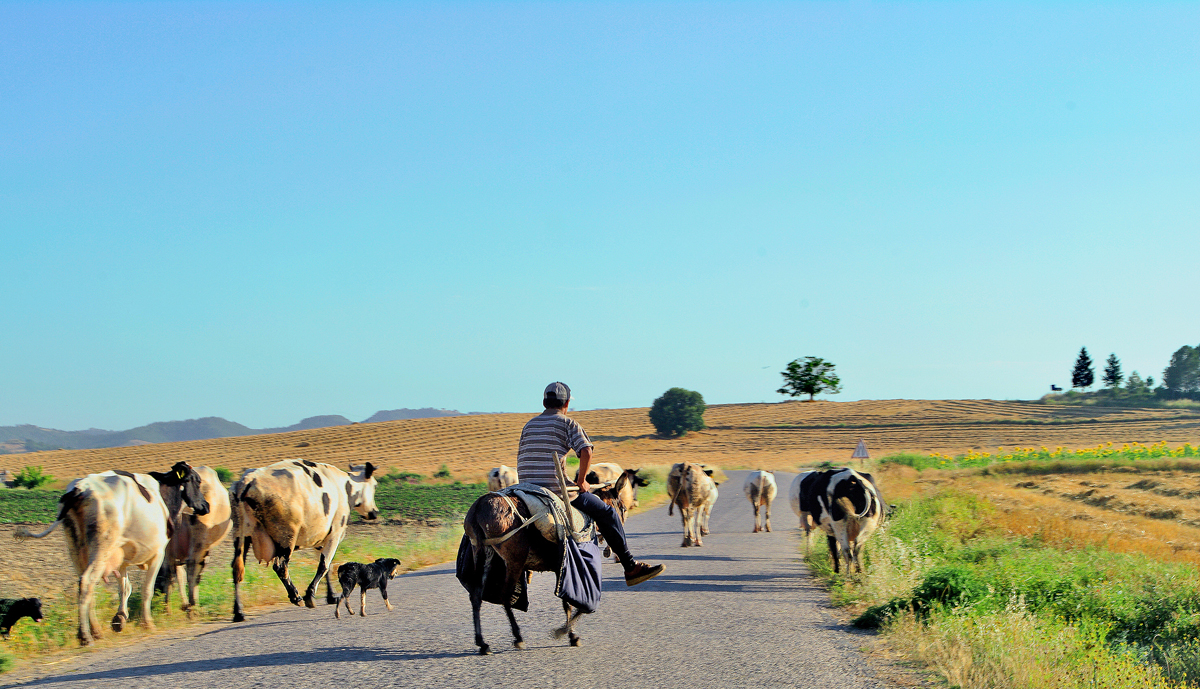
A shepherd and a cattle herd on the land road to village Hocalı, Sarıçam - Adana, Turkey.

Hocalı is a neighbourhood in the municipality and district of Sarıçam, Adana Province, Turkey. Its population is 449 (2022). Before 2008, it was part of the district of Yüreğir.
