= 2010 Mardakert clashes =

Series of violations of the First Nagorno-Karabakh War ceasefire

Coordinates: 40.210278°N 46.809167°E

- Part of Nagorno-Karabakh conflict
Date
Location
18–19 June; 1 September 2010
In and around Nagorno-Karabakh:
- Chayli, Mardakert Rayon
- Fuzuli District
- Jraberd, Mardakert Rayon

Belligerents
Nagorno-Karabakh; Armenia	Azerbaijan

Strength
Unknown	Unknown

Casualties and losses
June: 4 dead, 4 wounded September: 1 wounded (per Armenian); 3 dead (Azerbaijani claim)	June: 1 dead September: 1 dead (per Azerbaijani); 2 dead (Armenian claim)

The 2010 Mardakert clashes were a series of violations of the First Nagorno-Karabakh War ceasefire. They took place across the line of contact dividing Azerbaijan and the ethnic Armenian military forces of the unrecognized but de facto independent Nagorno-Karabakh Republic. Both sides accused the other of violating the ceasefire regime. These were the worst violations of the cease fire (which has been in place since 1994) in two years and left Armenian forces with the heaviest casualties since the Mardakert clashes of March 2008.

== June incident ==
The incident occurred near the village of Chayli, located in the province of Mardakert/Tartar in Nagorno-Karabakh on June 18–19. According to the Defense Ministry of the Nagorno-Karabakh Republic, Armenian forces along the line of contact came under surprise attack by a 20-man Azerbaijani reconnaissance or sabotage unit at about 11:30 PM on June 18. The Azeri forces killed four Armenian soldiers and an Azerbaijani warrant officer were killed, and four Armenians were wounded, one critically. According to the NKR Defense Ministry, the body of Azerbaijani Warrant Officer Mubariz Ibrahimov was left on the Armenian side of the contact line, as the rest of his unit retreated. Armenian forces retaliated the next day by launching an attack near Fizuli on June 20–21, killing one Azerbaijani serviceman. Azerbaijani forces claimed to have repelled the attack and inflicted further casualties on the Armenians.

=== Military analysis ===
Richard Giragosian, the director of the Armenian Center for National and International Studies and a former defense analyst for Jane's, described the intrusion as "either a test on Armenian response or a sign of lack of command and discipline in the Azerbaijani military." He described it as "more professional and more deadly than previous such incursions" and had been planned days in advance. The fact that the attack began with an Azerbaijani sniper inflicting a fatal head wound on an Armenian soldier was further evidence of this, he said.

== Reaction ==
=== Armenia ===
President of Armenia Serzh Sargsyan called the skirmish an "Azeri provocation," which took place hours after he had met his counterpart, Ilham Aliyev for peace talks regarding the resolution of the Nagorno-Karabakh conflict.

=== Azerbaijan ===
Officials in Azerbaijan dismissed the Armenians' claim. The Azerbaijani Defense Ministry said it was the Armenians who had fired at its forces using automatic rifles and machine guns. Azerbaijani Foreign Ministry spokesman Elkhan Polukhov stated that the skirmish was a "direct consequence of Armenia's failure to withdraw from occupied Azerbaijani territory."

Shortly after the incident, on July 22, Azerbaijani President Ilham Aliyev conferred Mubariz Ibrahimov with the title of National Hero of Azerbaijan for his services to the state while resisting attacks of Armenian forces. Azerbaijani sources have since claimed that Ibrahimov was single-handedly responsible for killing all four of the Armenian soldiers and wounding the five others. They have speculated that his actions were voluntary and the result of personal a desire to take vengeance against the enemy.

=== Reaction in the world ===
In his confirmation hearings as the United States' ambassador to Azerbaijan in July 2010, Matthew Bryza confirmed that the attack was initiated by the Azerbaijani side, stating "There was an Azerbaijani move across the line of contact, Armenia responded, resulting in deaths."

The Co-Chairs of the OSCE Minsk Group condemned the skirmish and stated that it was "an unacceptable violation of the 1994 Cease-Fire Agreement and...contrary to the stated commitment of the sides to refrain from the use of force or the threat of the use of force." The use of military force at this juncture "can only be seen as an attempt to damage the peace process."

== September incident ==
On September 1, 2010, on the eve of Dmitry Medvedev's visit to Azerbaijan, another skirmish took place near Jraberd, Mardakert/Tartar Rayon. Azerbaijan announced that two Azeris and three Armenians were killed, while Armenia claimed to have killed 4-7 Azeris at the cost of one wounded. One of the Azeris killed was Farid Ahmadov whose body, according to Azerbaijan, remained on the Armenian side of the frontlines. Both sides blamed the other for starting the attack. The Baku office of the International Red Cross appealed to the Armenian side requesting assistance in returning the bodies of both Ibrahimov and Ahmadov. The PACE resolution issued on October 6 also urged the Armenian side to return the bodies of both soldiers.

The military authorities of Nagorno-Karabakh handed over the bodies of Ibrahimov and Ahmadov to Azerbaijan on November 6 2010.

== See also ==
- First Nagorno-Karabakh War
- Nagorno-Karabakh conflict
- 2008 Mardakert skirmishes
