= Maltepe, Sarıçam =

Maltepe
- Neighbourhood
- Location in Turkey
- Coordinates: 37°12′59″N 35°26′3″E
- Country: Turkey
- Province: Adana
- District: Sarıçam
- Population (2022): 172
- Time zone: UTC+3 (TRT)

Maltepe is a neighbourhood in the municipality and district of Sarıçam, Adana Province, Turkey. Its population is 172 (2022). Before 2008, it was part of the district of Yüreğir.
