= Suluca, Sarıçam =

Suluca
- Neighbourhood
- Location in Turkey
- Coordinates: 36°58′23″N 35°34′4″E
- Country: Turkey
- Province: Adana
- District: Sarıçam
- Population (2022): 4,578
- Time zone: UTC+3 (TRT)

Suluca is a neighbourhood in the municipality and district of Sarıçam, Adana Province, Turkey. Its population is 4,578 (2022). Before 2008, it was part of the district of Yüreğir.

Suluca is also adjacent to Hacı Sabancı Organized Industrial Zone, which is one of the largest organized industrial zones in Adana.

The population of the town has increased after the construction of a large residential area by TOKİ.
