= Çamlıca, Sarıçam =

Çamlıca
- Neighbourhood
- Location in Turkey
- Coordinates: 37.0805°N 35.6133°E
- Country: Turkey
- Province: Adana
- District: Sarıçam
- Population (2022): 296
- Time zone: UTC+3 (TRT)

Çamlıca is a neighbourhood in the municipality and district of Sarıçam, Adana Province, Turkey. Its population is 296 (2022). Before 2008, it was part of the district of Yüreğir.
