= Dutluca, Sarıçam =

Dutluca
- Neighbourhood
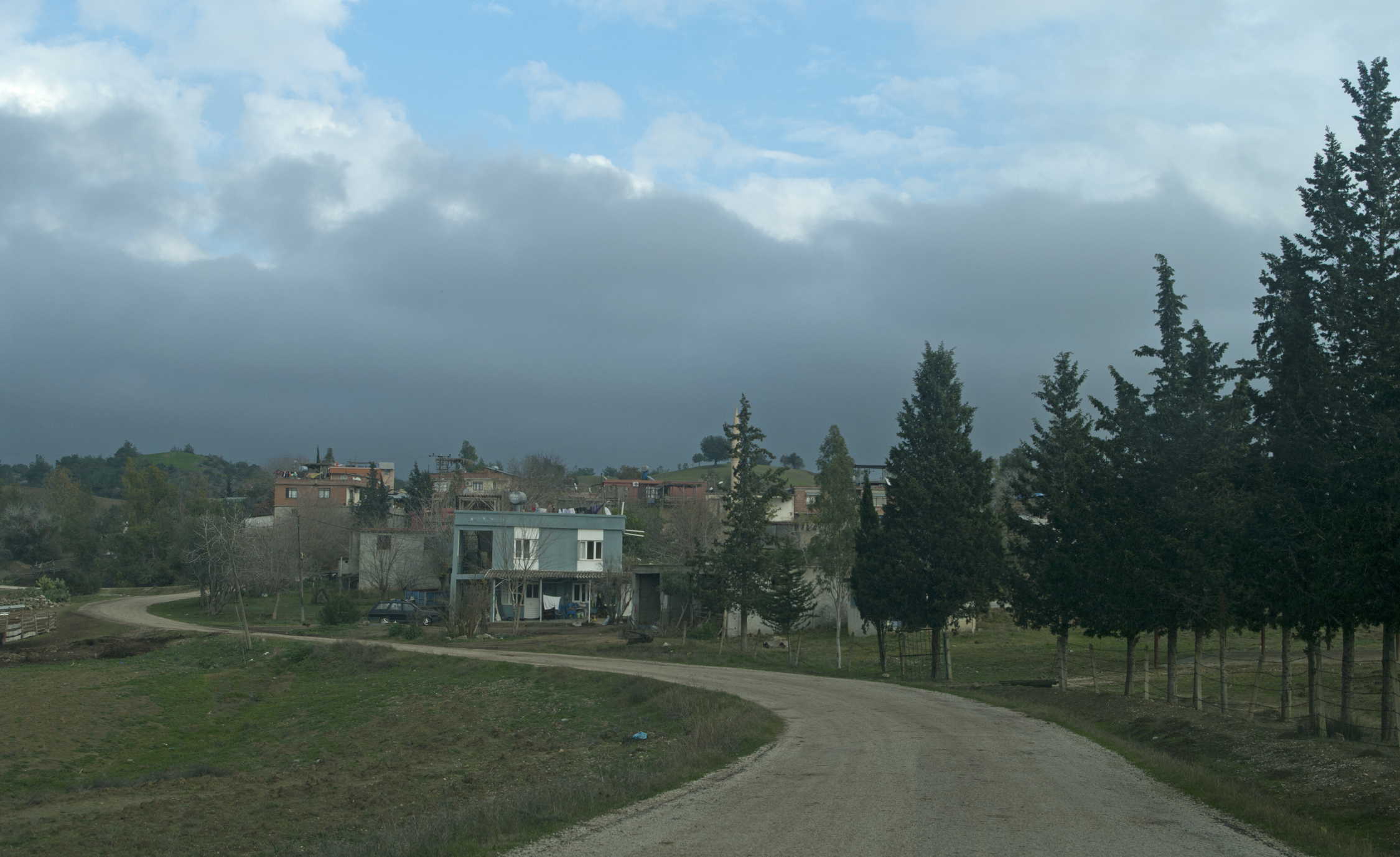

- Location within Turkey
- Coordinates: 37.1508°N 35.4375°E
- Country: Turkey
- Province: Adana
- District: Sarıçam
- Population (2022): 144
- Time zone: UTC+3 (TRT)

Dutluca is a neighbourhood in the municipality and district of Sarıçam, Adana Province, Turkey. Its population is 144 (2022). Before 2008, it was part of the district of Yüreğir.
