= Çiçekli, Sarıçam =

Çiçekli
- Neighbourhood
- Location in Turkey
- Coordinates: 37.182°N 35.306°E
- Country: Turkey
- Province: Adana
- District: Sarıçam
- Population (2022): 477
- Time zone: UTC+3 (TRT)

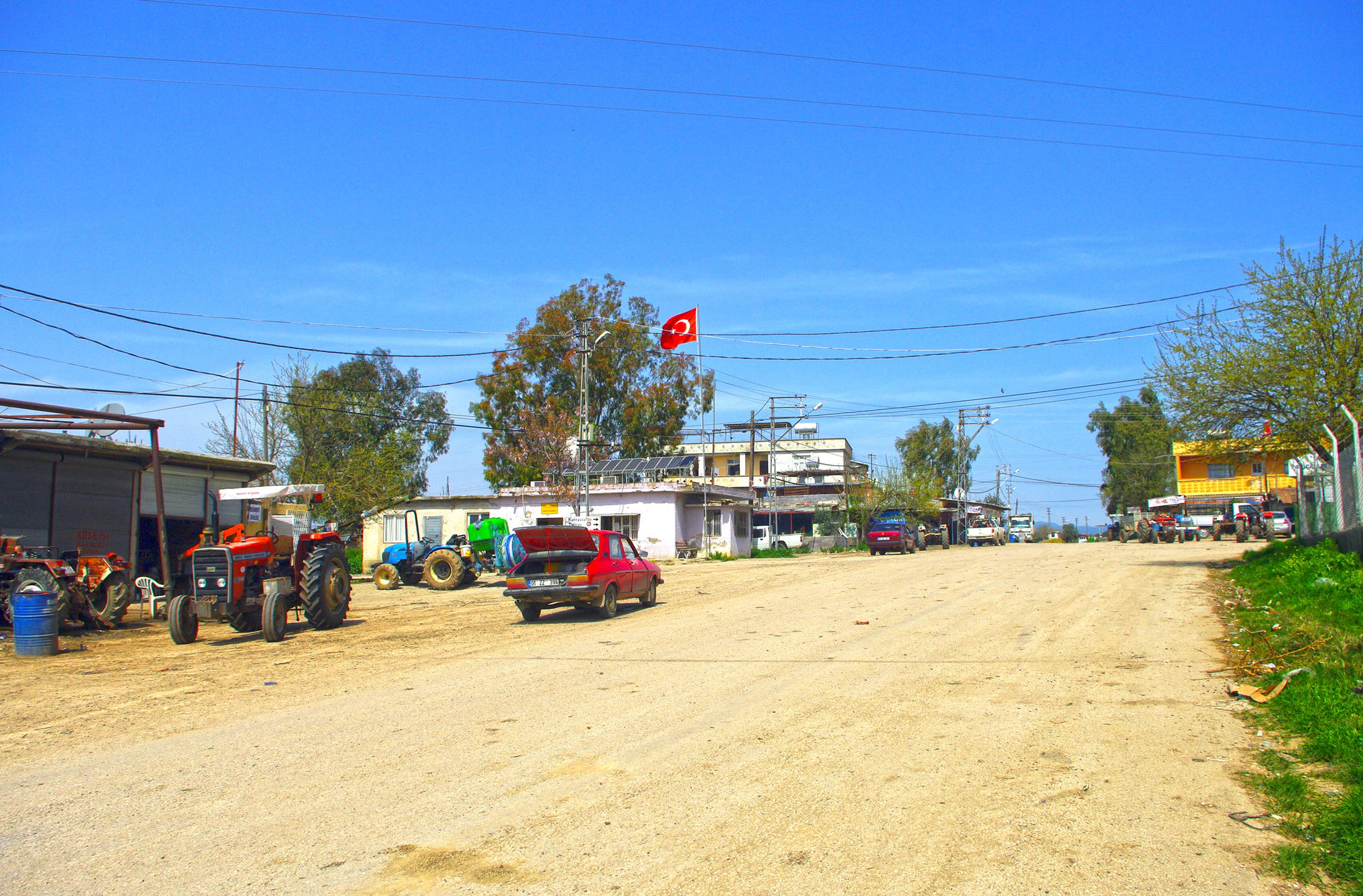
Road at the center of Çiçekli Village in Sarıçam, Adana, Turkey.

Çiçekli is a neighbourhood in the municipality and district of Sarıçam, Adana Province, Turkey. Its population is 477 (2022). Before 2008, it was part of the district of Yüreğir.
