= Qaraqocalı, Kurdamir =

Qaraqocalı
- Municipality
- Location within Azerbaijan
- Coordinates: 40°22′N 48°11′E
- Country: Azerbaijan
- Rayon: Kurdamir
- Time zone: UTC+4 (AZT)
  - Summer (DST): UTC+5 (AZT)

Qaraqocalı (also, Karagodzhaly and Karagadzhaly) is a village and municipality in the Kurdamir Rayon of Azerbaijan.
