= Mehrili, Qubadli =

Mehrili
- Location within Azerbaijan
- Coordinates: 39°18′03″N 46°33′33″E
- Country: Azerbaijan
- Rayon: Qubadli
- Time zone: UTC+4 (AZT)
  - Summer (DST): UTC+5 (AZT)

Mehrili (also, Mekhrili, Mekhdili, and Meqirli) is a village in the Qubadli Rayon of Azerbaijan.
