= Kommuna, Permsky District, Perm Krai =

Kommuna Коммуна
- Village
- Location within Perm Krai Location within Russia
- Coordinates: 57°52′N 55°30′E
- Country: Russia
- Region: Perm Krai
- District: Permsky District
- Time zone: UTC+5:00

Kommuna (Russian: Коммуна) is a rural locality (a village) in Zabolotskoye Rural Settlement, Permsky District, Perm Krai, Russia. The population was 15 as of 2010. There are 4 streets.

== Geography ==
Kommuna is located 59 km southwest of Perm (the district's administrative centre) by road. Novoilyinskoye is the nearest rural locality.
