= İncirlik =

- Former municipality
- Location within Turkey
- Coordinates: 36°59′10″N 35°26′03″E
- Country: Turkey
- Region: Cilicia
- Province: Adana
- District: Sarıçam
- Elevation: 60 m (200 ft)

Population (2022)
  - Total: 15,763
- Time zone: UTC+3 (TRT)
- Area code: 0322

İncirlik (Turkish pronunciation: [indʒiɾˈlik]) is a town and former municipality in the Sarıçam district of Adana Province in southern Turkey, 8 km (5 mi) east of the centre of Adana. Its population is 15,763 (2022).

== Climate ==
Climate data for İncirlik (2000-2023)
Month	Jan	Feb	Mar	Apr	May	Jun	Jul	Aug	Sep	Oct	Nov	Dec	Year
Daily mean °C (°F)	9.8 (49.6)	11.2 (52.2)	14.0 (57.2)	17.8 (64.0)	21.8 (71.2)	25.7 (78.3)	28.8 (83.8)	29.4 (84.9)	26.7 (80.1)	22.6 (72.7)	16.5 (61.7)	11.7 (53.1)	19.7 (67.4)
Average precipitation mm (inches)	117.97 (4.64)	80.99 (3.19)	71.24 (2.80)	50.06 (1.97)	50.95 (2.01)	16.22 (0.64)	6.21 (0.24)	5.96 (0.23)	16.35 (0.64)	31.13 (1.23)	59.52 (2.34)	116.44 (4.58)	623.04 (24.51)
Average precipitation days (≥ 0.1mm)	10.8	9.8	9.4	8.8	6.5	2.2	0.9	0.9	3.2	5.4	6.3	9.0	73.2
Source: Meteomanz

== Governance ==
İncirlik municipality was established within the Yüreğir district in 1971. In 2008, it became part of the newly created district of Sarıçam and was incorporated into the municipality of Sarıçam as the three meighbourhoods Hürriyet, Kemalpaşa and Yenimahalle. Each neighbourhood is administered by the Muhtar and the Seniors Council.

== Economy ==
İncirlik's economy is mainly agriculture and manufacturing. The major institution in İncirlik is NATO's Incirlik Air Base.

== Transport ==
İncirlik railway station, opened in 1912, is currently served by two regional lines and one long-distance line.

Adana Metropolitan Municipality Bus Department (ABBO) has bus routes from downtown Adana to İncirlik. İncirlik Minibus Co-operative also conducts local transport from downtown.
