= Qaraqocalı, Shamkir =

Qaraqocalı
- Location within Azerbaijan
- Coordinates: 40°43′23″N 46°02′41″E
- Country: Azerbaijan
- Rayon: Shamkir
- Municipality: Mehrili
- Time zone: UTC+4 (AZT)
  - Summer (DST): UTC+5 (AZT)

Qaraqocalı (also, Karagodzhaly) is a village in the Shamkir Rayon of Azerbaijan. The village forms part of the municipality of Mehrili.
