= Çaylı, Qazax =

Çaylı
- Municipality
- Location within Azerbaijan
- Coordinates: 41°07′38″N 45°18′16″E
- Country: Azerbaijan
- Rayon: Qazakh

Population
  - Total: 7,731
- Time zone: UTC+4 (AZT)
  - Summer (DST): UTC+5 (AZT)

Çaylı or Chayly (previously named as Çaylı-Kəsəmən) is a village and municipality in the Qazakh Rayon of Azerbaijan. It has a population of 7731 (2009).
