= Sarıçam =

- District and municipality
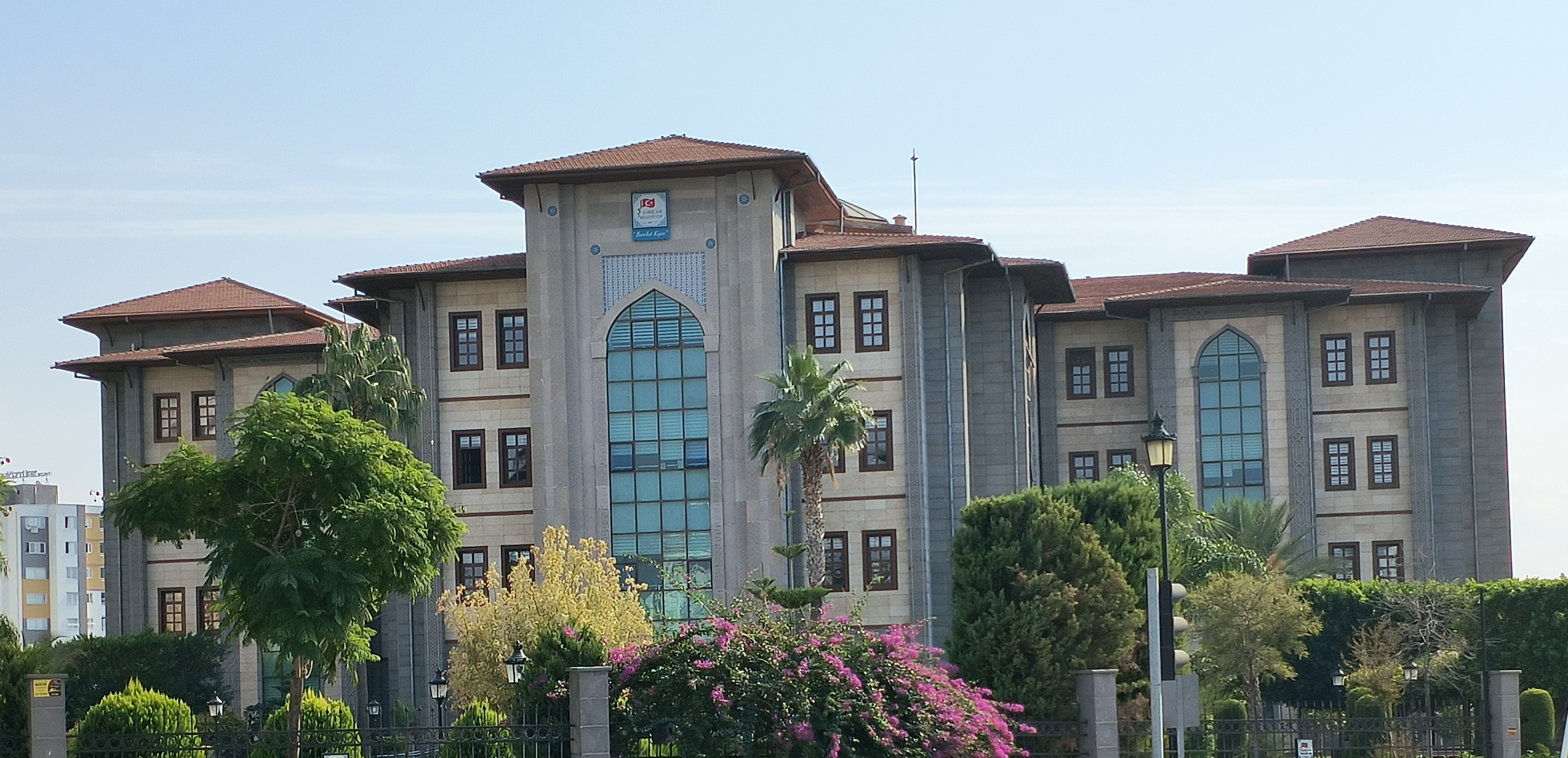
- Sarıçam Municipality Hall

- Map showing Sarıçam District in Adana Province

- Location within Turkey
- Coordinates: 37°02′N 35°25′E
- Country: Turkey
- Province: Adana

Government
  - Mayor: Bilal Uludağ (MHP)
- Area: 770 km^{2} (300 sq mi)
- Elevation: 60 m (200 ft)
- Population (2022): 221,733
  - Density: 290/km^{2} (750/sq mi)
- Time zone: UTC+3 (TRT)
- Postal code: 01260
- Area code: 0322
- Website: www.saricam.bel.tr

Sarıçam is a municipality and district of Adana Province, Turkey. Its area is 770 km^{2}, and its population is 221,733 (2022). The southern section of the district is part of the Adana Urban Area. The district is located north of the Yüreğir district, east of the Seyhan River and the Seyhan Reservoir. Çukurova University, Adana Science and Technology University, the New Adana Stadium and the Adana Industrial Park are located in Sarıçam.

== History ==
In 2008 the district Sarıçam was created from part of the district Yüreğir. The urban part of the new district, 28 neighbourhoods, was established as a municipality. At the 2013 Turkish local government reorganisation, the rural part of the district was integrated into the municipality, the villages becoming neighbourhoods.

== Governance ==
Sarıçam district is administered by three levels of government; central government, provincial administration and the municipalities.

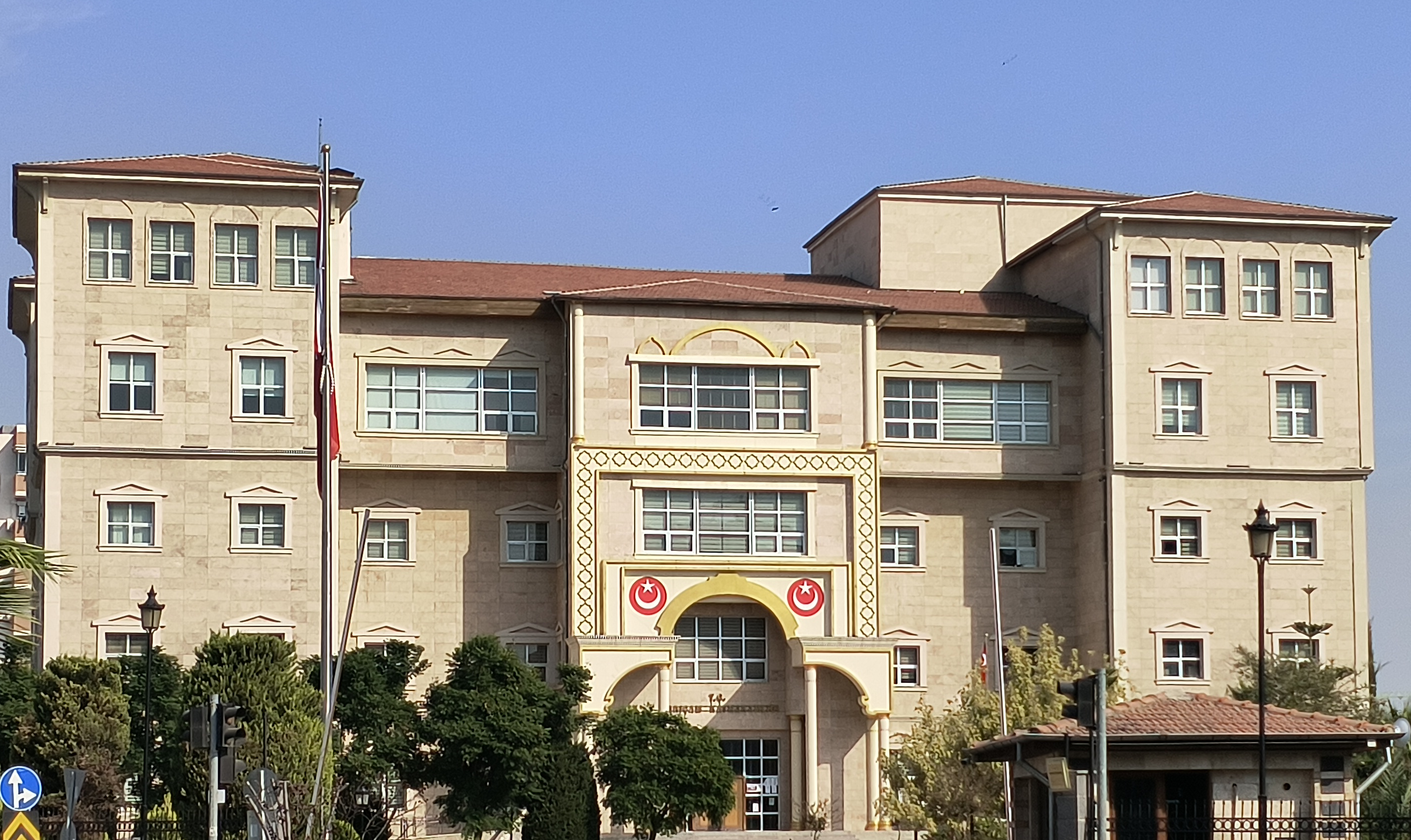
District Hall

Sarıçam Governorship is the district branch of the central government operating under the Adana Governorship. The chief executive of the Sarıçam district is the District Governor who is appointed by the Ministry of Internal Affairs. Sarıçam Governorship overseas the functioning of the district directorates of the ministries.

Sarıçam directorate of the Adana Province Special Administration is the district branch of the provincial administration. Sarıçam district is represented with 5 members at the 61-member Adana Provincial Parliament.

=== Sarıçam Municipality ===
Since the 2013 reorganisation, the Sarıçam municipality covers the whole area of the Sarıçam district. Sarıçam Municipality is a lower tier municipality of City of Adana and it is further divided into neighbourhoods.

Sarıçam Municipality was incorporated in 2008 as a lower-tier municipality of the city of Adana, after the split of the northern section from Yüreğir district. The organs of the Sarıçam Municipality are the mayor, encümen (the executive committee) and the municipal council.

Mayor is the chief executive of the municipality, presides municipal departments and chairs the municipal council. Mayoral candidates are either nominated by National Parties or run independently. The mayor is elected by first past the post voting for a 5-year term. Bilal Uludağ is the mayor of Sarıçam since 2014. In the local elections in March 2014, he was elected with %47,7 of the popular votes.

Sarıçam Mayor Election, 2014
Party		Candidate	Votes	%	±%
1	MHP	Bilal Uludağ	36,813	47,7	
2	AKP	Ahmet Zenbilci	29,290	37,9	
3	CHP	Cumali Yakan	7,989	10,3	
4	HDP	Mehmet Sait Meviş	1,252	1,6	

Encümen is the executive committee of the Sarıçam Municipality.The mayor presides the encümen and the committee consists of 7 members, 3 councilors elected from the municipal council, 3 department directors appointed by the mayor and the treasurer.

Municipal Council is the decision making organ of the Sarıçam Municipality. It is responsible for approving by-laws, founding, splitting or amalgamating neighbourhoods, strategic planning, urban development planning and zoning, making investments, budgeting, loaning and controlling the mayor's activities. The chair of the council is the mayor. The council consists of 25 members. The candidates for the councilor positions are either nominated by National Parties or run independently. The councilors are elected by the d'Hondt method, where the whole municipality is one electoral district and there is 10% threshold for a party to gain seat at the council. As with mayor, councilors are elected for a 5-year term. Turkish nationalist MHP leads the council with 14 members and conservative AKP has 11 members at the council.

== Neighbourhoods ==
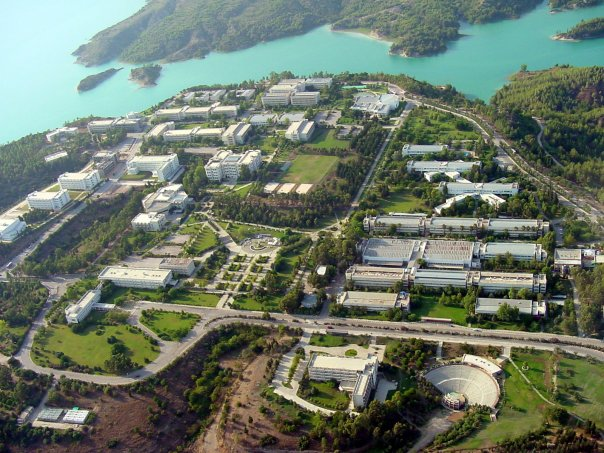
Main campus of Çukurova University in Sarıçam.

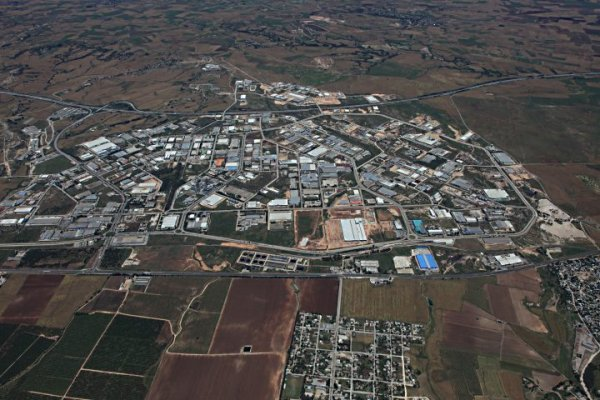
Adana Industrial Park

Neighbourhoods (Mahalle) are administered by the muhtar and the Neighbourhood Seniors Council consisting of 4 members. Muhtar and the Senior Council are elected for 5 years at the local elections and are not affiliated with political parties. Neighbourhoods are not an incorporation therefore do not hold government status. Muhtar although being elected by the residents, acts merely as an administrator of the district governor. Muhtar also voices the neighbourhood issues to the municipal hall together with the Seniors Council.

Sarıçam has a total of 68 neighbourhoods, 28 of the neighbourhoods are in the urban area, the others are rural.

The following neighborhoods were transferred from Yüreğir district to Sarıçam district on March 22, 2008, in accordance with the reasons stated in the law:

1. Ayvalı
2. Bayramhacılı
3. Çarkıpare
4. Çınarlı
5. Mehmet Akif Ersoy
6. Yıldırım Beyazıt
7. Remzi Oğuz Arık (Affiliated with Baklalı Primary Municipality)
8. Küçükbaklalı
9. Büyükbaklalı (Affiliated with Buruk Primary Municipality)
10. İstiklal
11. Cumhuriyet (Affiliated with Sofulu Primary Municipality)
12. Esentepe
13. Orhangazi
14. Sofudede
15. Şahintepe
16. Yeşiltepe
17. Yavuz Sultan Selim
18. Beyceli
19. Gültepe (Affiliated with Kürkçüler Primary Municipality)
20. Göztepe
21. Müminli
22. Yürekli
23. Dağcı (Affiliated with Suluca Primary Municipality)
24. Northern part of Karşıyaka Neighborhood along D-400 Highway
25. Northern part of Acıdere Neighborhood along D-400 Highway (Affiliated with İncirlik Primary Municipality)
26. Hürriyet
27. Kemalpaşa
28. Yeni Mahalle

The 68 neighbourhoods of Sarıçam District are:

- Acıdere
- Aflak
- Akkuyu
- Avcılar
- Aydınyurdu
- Ayvalı
- Balcalı
- Bayramhacılı
- Beyceli
- Boynuyoğun
- Boztepe
- Buruk Cumhuriyet
- Büyük Baklalı
- Çamlıca
- Çarkıpare
- Çaylı
- Cerenli
- Çiçekli
- Cihadiye
- Çınarlı
- Çirişgediği
- Dağcı
- Dutluca
- Eğeciuşağı
- Ertuğrulgazi
- Esentepe
- Gökbuket
- Göztepe
- Gültepe
- Hakkıbeyli
- Hasanbeyli
- Hocalı
- Hürriyet
- İstiklal
- Karaömerli
- Karayusuflu
- Kargakekeç
- Karlık
- Kaşobası
- Kemalpaşa
- Kepeztepe
- Kılbaş
- Kılıçlı
- Kızılkaş
- Kösefakılı
- Küçük Baklalı
- Maltepe
- Mehmet Akif Ersoy
- Menekşe
- Müminli
- Mustafalar
- Orhangazi
- Osmangazi
- Remzi Oğuz Arık
- Şahintepe
- Sarıçam
- Sofudede
- Suluca
- Turunçlu
- Ünlüce
- Yağızlar
- Yarımca
- Yavuz Sultan Selim
- Yenimahalle
- Yeniyayla
- Yeşiltepe
- Yıldırım Beyazıt
- Yürekli

=== Neighbourhoods in the urban area ===
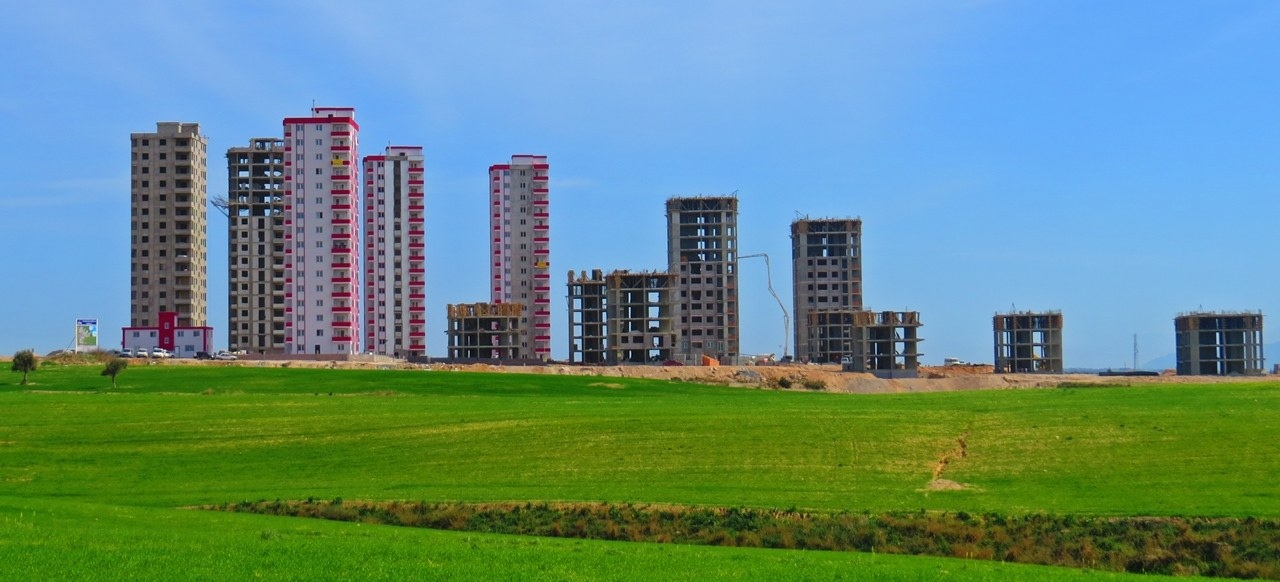
Residential development in Sarıçam

There are 28 urban neighbourhoods in the Sarıçam municipality. 7 of these neighbourhoods are ceded from Yüreğir municipality and the rest are the neighbourhoods of the former municipalities Baklalı, Kürkçüler, Sofulu, Suluca, İncirlik and Buruk.

Urban neighbourhoods ceded from Yüreğir district: The 4 neighbourhoods are Ayvalı, Bayramhacılı, Çarkıpare, Remzi Oğuz Arık, Çınarlı, Mehmet Akif Ersoy and Yıldırım Beyazıt.

Sofulu: The 8 neighbourhoods are Esentepe, Orhangazi, Sofudede, Şahintepe, Yeşiltepe, Yavuz Sultan Selim, Beyceli and Gültepe.

İncirlik: The 3 neighbourhoods are Hürriyet, Kemalpaşa and Yeni Mahalle.

Buruk: The 2 neighbourhoods are İstiklal and Cumhuriyet.

Baklalı: The 2 neighbourhoods are Küçükbaklalı and Büyükbaklalı.

Kürkçüler: The 4 neighbourhoods are Göztepe, Müminli, Yürekliand Dağcı.

Suluca: The 2 neighbourhoods are Karşıyaka and Acıdere.
