= Cəyli =

- Municipality
- Location within Azerbaijan
- Coordinates: 40°26′04″N 48°16′05″E
- Country: Azerbaijan
- Rayon: Kurdamir

Area
  - Total: 1,140.92 ha (2,819.3 acres)

Population
  - Total: 2,830
- Time zone: UTC+4 (AZT)
  - Summer (DST): UTC+5 (AZT)

Cəyli (also, Çəyli, Dzhayly, Dzheyilli, and Dzheyli) is a village and municipality in the Kurdamir Rayon of Azerbaijan. The following other villages are within the municipality: Şahbəyli kəndi, Bala Kəngərli kəndi, and Ucarlı kəndi
