= Kommuna, Vladimir Oblast =

Kommuna Коммуна
- Village
- Location within Vladimir Oblast Location within Russia
- Coordinates: 55°36′N 41°59′E
- Country: Russia
- Region: Vladimir Oblast
- District: Muromsky District
- Time zone: UTC+3:00

Kommuna (Russian: Комму́на) is a rural locality (a village) in Muromsky District, Vladimir Oblast, Russia. The population was 11 as of 2010. There are 2 streets.

== Geography ==
Kommuna is located 15 km northwest of Murom. Stroydetal is the nearest rural locality.
