= Kommuna, Voronezh Oblast =

Kommuna Коммуна
- Settlement
- Location within Voronezh Oblast Location within Russia
- Coordinates: 51°13′N 39°41′E
- Country: Russia
- Region: Voronezh Oblast
- District: Kashirsky District
- Time zone: UTC+3:00

Kommuna (Russian: Коммуна) is a rural locality (a settlement) in Mozhayskoye Rural Settlement, Kashirsky District, Voronezh Oblast, Russia. The population was 57 as of 2010.

== Geography ==
Kommuna is located 26 km south of Kashirskoye (the district's administrative centre) by road. Posyolok Ilyicha is the nearest rural locality.
