= Çaylı, Shamkir =

Çaylı
- Location within Azerbaijan
- Coordinates: 40°44′08″N 46°03′31″E
- Country: Azerbaijan
- Rayon: Shamkir
- Municipality: Mehrili
- Time zone: UTC+4 (AZT)
  - Summer (DST): UTC+5 (AZT)

Çaylı (also, Chayly) is a village in the Shamkir Rayon of Azerbaijan. The village forms part of the municipality of Mehrili.
