= Mehrili, Shamkir =

Mehrili
- Municipality
- Location within Azerbaijan
- Coordinates: 40°42′59″N 46°03′11″E
- Country: Azerbaijan
- Rayon: Shamkir

Population
  - Total: 2,048
- Time zone: UTC+4 (AZT)
  - Summer (DST): UTC+5 (AZT)

Mehrili (also, Mehralı) is a village and municipality in the Shamkir Rayon of Azerbaijan. It has a population of 2,048. The municipality consists of the villages of Mehrili, Qaraqocalı, and Çaylı.
