= Kommune =

Kommune may refer to:

- The term for municipality (commune) in Germany, Norway or Denmark (and, similarly, a kommun in Sweden and Finland, and kommuna in the Faroe Islands)
- An intentional community
  - Kommune 1

== See also ==
- Kommuna (disambiguation)
- Komunë, a administrative division
