= Komunë =

Commune in Albania or Kosovo

Komunë (Albanian definite form: Komuna) most commonly translated as municipality or commune in English. It may refer to:

Country	Singular	Plural	related article
Albania	komunë (komuna)	komuna (komunat)	rural municipalities of Albania (2nd level) administrative units of Albania (3rd level)
Kosovo	komunë (komuna)	komuna (komunat)	municipalities of Kosovo (1st level)

== See also ==
- Kommune (disambiguation)
