= Mollalar (Əlimədətli), Agdam =

Mollalar
- Location within Azerbaijan
- Coordinates: 40°04′07.7″N 46°49′31.2″E
- Country: Azerbaijan
- District: Agdam

Population (2015)
  - Total: 281
- Time zone: UTC+4 (AZT)

Mollalar is a village in the Agdam District of Azerbaijan.

== History ==
The village was located in the Armenian-occupied territories surrounding Nagorno-Karabakh, coming under the control of ethnic Armenian forces during the First Nagorno-Karabakh War in the early 1990s. The village subsequently became part of the breakaway Republic of Artsakh as part of its Martakert Province, where it was known as Nor Aygestan (Armenian: Նոր Այգեստան). It was returned to Azerbaijan as part of the 2020 Nagorno-Karabakh ceasefire agreement.

== Historical heritage sites ==
Historical heritage sites in and around the village include tombs from the 2nd–1st millennia BCE.
