= Mehdili, Barda =

Mehdili
- Municipality
- Location within Azerbaijan Location within Karabakh Economic Region
- Coordinates: 40°17′N 47°12′E
- Country: Azerbaijan
- Rayon: Barda

Population
  - Total: 1,152
- Time zone: UTC+4 (AZT)
  - Summer (DST): UTC+5 (AZT)

Mehdili (also, Mekhdili and Mekhtili) is a village and municipality in the Barda Rayon of Azerbaijan. It has a population of 1,152.
