= Kommuna, Gunibsky District, Republic of Dagestan =

Kommuna Коммуна ГӀурулгьоцӀиб
- Selo
- Location within Republic of Dagestan Location within Russia
- Coordinates: 42°22′N 46°58′E
- Country: Russia
- Region: Republic of Dagestan
- District: Gunibsky District
- Time zone: UTC+3:00

Kommuna (Russian: Коммуна; Avar: ГӀурулгьоцӀиб) is a rural locality (a selo) in Chokhsky Selsoviet, Gunibsky District, Republic of Dagestan, Russia. The population was 734 as of 2010.

== Nationalities ==
Avars live there.

== Geography ==
Kommuna is located 7 km south of Gunib (the district's administrative centre) by road. Gunib and Khutni are the nearest rural localities.
