= Mehdili, Kurdamir =

Mehdili
- Municipality
- Location within Azerbaijan
- Coordinates: 40°02′35″N 48°17′31″E
- Country: Azerbaijan
- Rayon: Kurdamir
- Time zone: UTC+4 (AZT)
  - Summer (DST): UTC+5 (AZT)

Mehdili (Also known by the names of Mekhdili and Mekhtily) is a village and municipality in the Kurdamir Rayon of Azerbaijan. Its Postal Code is AZ 3334.
