= Çaylı, Hajigabul =

Çaylı
- Location within Azerbaijan
- Coordinates: 40°12′N 48°56′E
- Country: Azerbaijan
- Rayon: Hajigabul
- Time zone: UTC+4 (AZT)
  - Summer (DST): UTC+5 (AZT)

Çaylı (also, Chayli) is a village in the Hajigabul Rayon of Azerbaijan.
