= Chayli, Iran =

Village in Golestan province, Iran

Chayli Persian: چايلي
- Village
- Location within Iran
- Coordinates: 37°54′35″N 55°44′18″E
- Country: Iran
- Province: Golestan
- County: Maraveh Tappeh
- District: Central
- Rural District: Maraveh Tappeh

Population (2016)
  - Total: 402
- Time zone: UTC+3:30 (IRST)

Chayli (Persian: چايلي) (Note: Also romanized as Chāylī; also known as Chāylū) is a village in Maraveh Tappeh Rural District of the Central District in Maraveh Tappeh County, Golestan province, Iran.

== Demographics ==
=== Population ===
At the time of the 2006 National Census, the village's population was 306 in 58 households, when it was in the former Maraveh Tappeh District of Kalaleh County. The following census in 2011 counted 376 people in 96 households, by which time the district had been separated from the county in the establishment of Maraveh Tappeh County. The rural district was transferred to the new Central District. The 2016 census measured the population of the village as 402 people in 117 households.
