= Biləsuvar =

Bilasuvar Biləsuvar
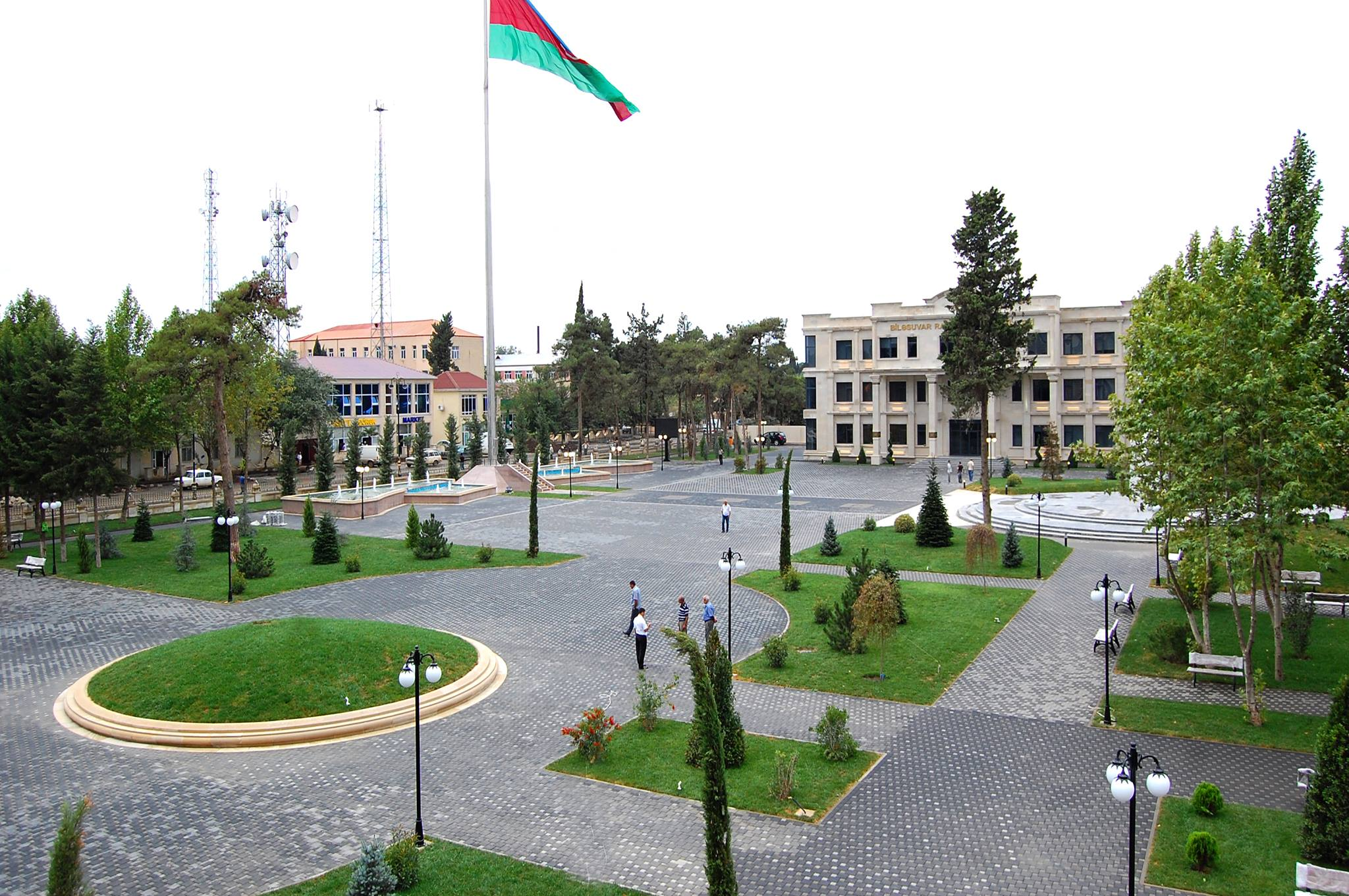

- Location within Azerbaijan
- Coordinates: 39°27′30″N 48°32′42″E
- Country: Azerbaijan
- Region: Aran
- District: Bilasuvar
- Elevation: 5 m (16 ft)

Population (2010)
  - Total: 20,101
- Time zone: UTC+4 (AZT)
- Area code: +994 25
- Website: bilesuvar-ih.gov.az

Bilasuvar (Azerbaijani: Biləsuvar) is a city in and the capital of the Bilasuvar District of Azerbaijan. The area's considerable agricultural potential depends on irrigation. It is situated near one of the country's four border crossings with Iran.

It has been said that the city's name was called "Pileh-Swar", which meant ‘Elephant-riding Person’ in Persian language, a reference to an early emir. In Azerbaijani the name means ‘Pure Waterfalls‘.

The city is located in the Central Aran region. Biləsuvar was divided into two parts in 1828 with the Turkmanchay Treaty between Qajar Iran and the Russian Empire, which concluded the Russo-Persian War (1826–1828). The similarly-named Iranian city of Bileh Savar is located right across the border.

== Climate ==
Climate data for Bilasuvar(normals for 1936-1992)
Month	Jan	Feb	Mar	Apr	May	Jun	Jul	Aug	Sep	Oct	Nov	Dec	Year
Average precipitation mm (inches)	30.6 (1.20)	29.3 (1.15)	38.4 (1.51)	29.3 (1.15)	26.4 (1.04)	16.2 (0.64)	4.7 (0.19)	7.6 (0.30)	21.3 (0.84)	41.4 (1.63)	41.3 (1.63)	31.1 (1.22)	317.6 (12.5)
Average precipitation days (≥ 0.01 in)	7.4	7.8	9.3	6.7	6.1	3.8	1.7	1.8	4.2	7.4	8.4	7.4	72
Source: NCEI

== Gallery ==
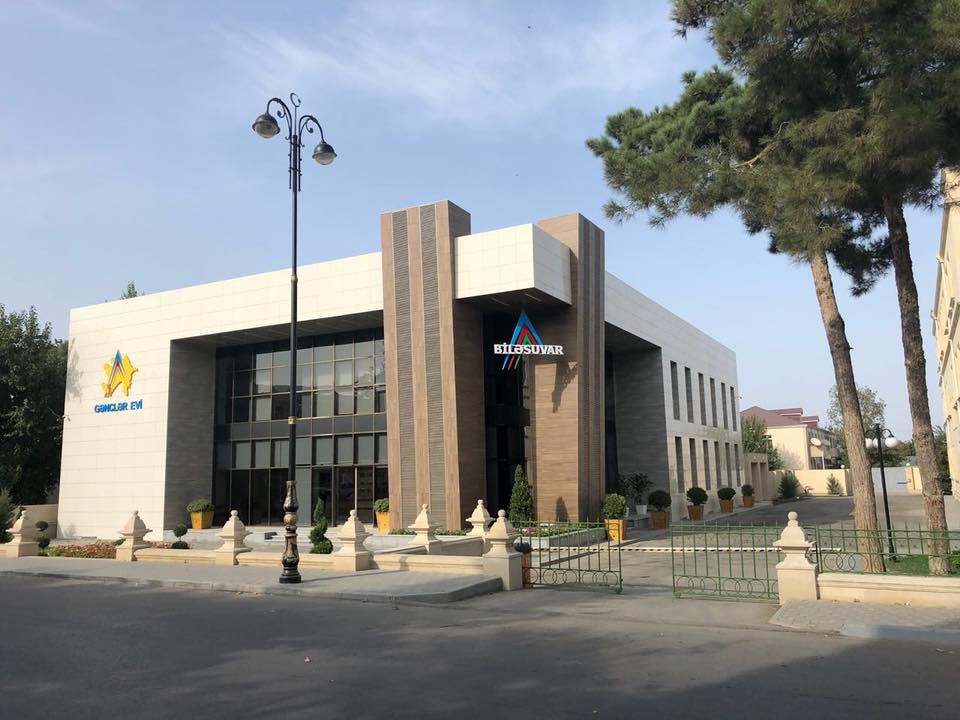
Youth Center

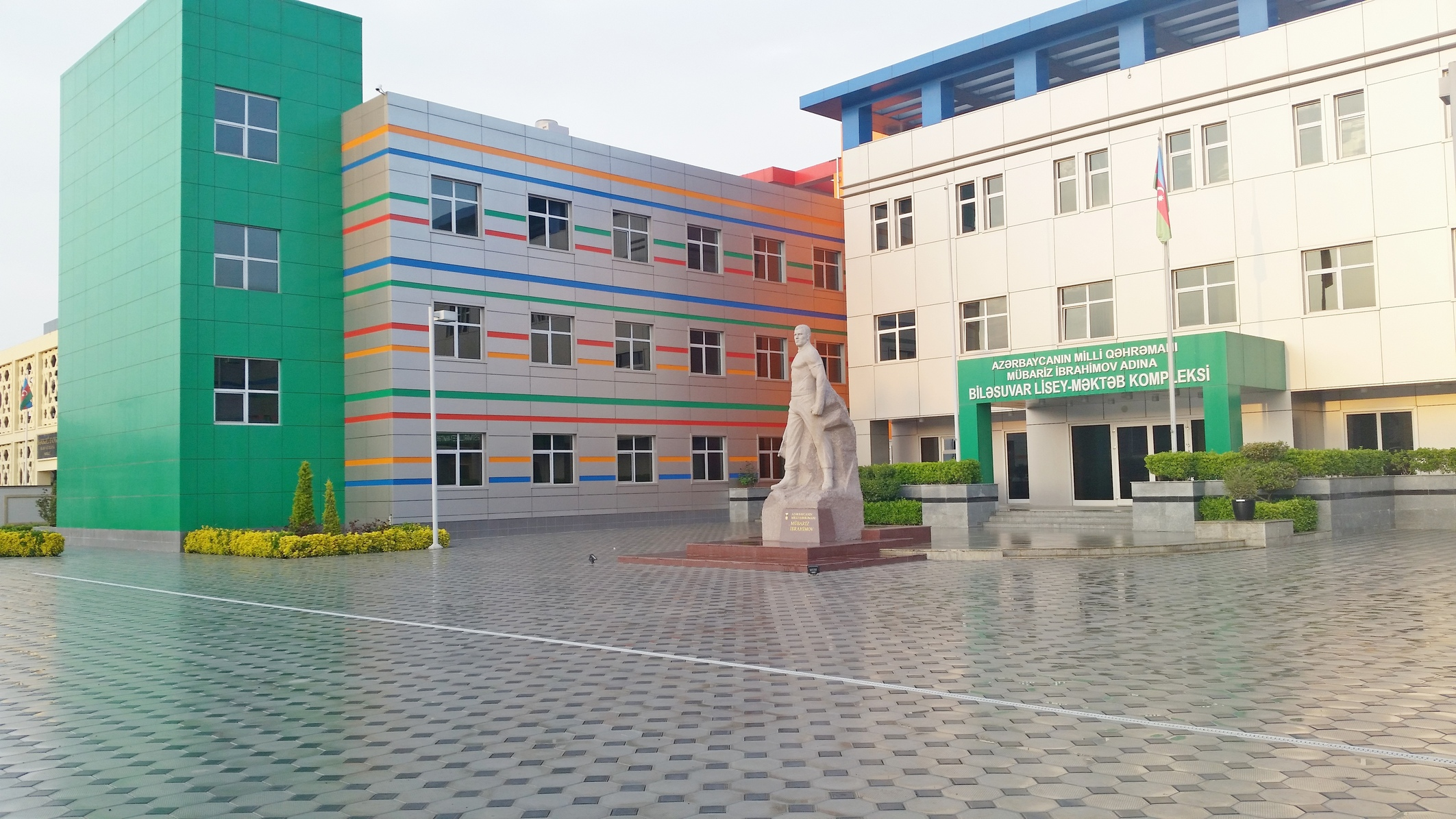
School named after hero Mubariz Ibrahimov
