= Əliabad, Lerik =

Aliabad
- Municipality
- Azerbaijani: Əliabad
- Location within Azerbaijan
- Coordinates: 38°50′26″N 48°26′50″E
- Country: Azerbaijan
- District: Lerik
- Time zone: UTC+4 (AZT)
  - Summer (DST): UTC+5 (AZT)

Aliabad is a village and municipality in the Lerik District of Azerbaijan.
