= Buruk Cumhuriyet =

- Neighbourhood
- Location in Turkey
- Coordinates: 37.0358°N 35.4515°E
- Country: Turkey
- Province: Adana
- District: Sarıçam
- Population (2022): 2,039
- Time zone: UTC+3 (TRT)

Buruk Cumhuriyet is a neighbourhood in the district of Sarıçam, Adana Province, Turkey. Its population is 2,039 (2022). Before 2008, it was part of the district of Yüreğir.
