= İkinci Çaylı =

- Municipality
- Location within Azerbaijan
- Coordinates: 40°39′40″N 48°43′20″E
- Country: Azerbaijan
- Rayon: Shamakhi

Population
  - Total: 510
- Time zone: UTC+4 (AZT)
  - Summer (DST): UTC+5 (AZT)

İkinci Çaylı (also, Çaylı, Chayly, and Chayly Vtoryye) is a village and municipality in the Shamakhi Rayon of Azerbaijan.

== Population ==
It has a population of 510.
