= Əliabad, Nakhchivan =

Settlement and municipality in Azerbaijan

Aliabad
- Municipality
- Azerbaijani: Əliabad
- Location within Azerbaijan
- Coordinates: 39°13′36″N 45°23′54″E
- Country: Azerbaijan
- Autonomous republic: Nakhchivan AR
- City: Nakhchivan City

Population (2008)
  - Total: 9,495
- Time zone: UTC+4 (AZT)

Aliabad is a settlement and municipality in Nakhchivan City, Nakhchivan AR, Azerbaijan. It is located in the near of the Nakhchivan-Sharur highway, on the plain. Its population is busy with grain-growing, vegetable-growing and animal husbandry. There are secondary school, music school, library, club, kindergarten and a medical center in the settlement. In the center of the settlement was built the memorial complex of "Martyrs". It has a population of 9,495.

== Etymology ==
In Soviet times, it was called in the name of Armenian bolshevik Alexander Miasnikian. Since 1991, it is officially registered as Aliabad. The name of the settlement means "the settlement which belongs to Ali".

== Monuments ==
There was an Armenian church (St. Astvatsatsin Church) located in the central part of the settlement. The church was destroyed at some point between 1997 and 2005.

== See also ==
- St. Astvatsatsin Church (Aliabad)
