= Birinci Çaylı =

- Municipality
- Location within Azerbaijan
- Coordinates: 40°28′02″N 48°42′39″E
- Country: Azerbaijan
- Rayon: Shamakhi

Population
  - Total: 1,685 (2,009)
- Time zone: UTC+4 (AZT)
  - Summer (DST): UTC+5 (AZT)

Birinci Çaylı (also, Çaylı, Chayly, Chayly Pervyy, and Chayly Pervyye) is a village and municipality in the Shamakhi Rayon of Azerbaijan.

== Population ==
As of 2009, it has a population of 1,685.
