= Kommuna, Qazax =

Bala Chayly
- Municipality
- Location within Azerbaijan
- Coordinates: 41°06′N 45°18′E
- Country: Azerbaijan
- Rayon: Qazakh

Population
  - Total: 1,002
- Time zone: UTC+4 (AZT)
  - Summer (DST): UTC+5 (AZT)

Bala Chayly (formerly Kommuna, also Çaylı Kommuna and Chayly Kommuna) is a village and municipality in the Qazakh Rayon of Azerbaijan. It has a population of 1,002.
