= Əliabad, Jalilabad =

Aliabad
- Municipality
- Azerbaijani: Əliabad
- Location within Azerbaijan
- Coordinates: 39°13′N 48°25′E
- Country: Azerbaijan
- District: Jalilabad

Population
  - Total: 735
- Time zone: UTC+4 (AZT)
  - Summer (DST): UTC+5 (AZT)

Aliabad is a village and municipality in the Jalilabad District of Azerbaijan. It has a population of 735.
