= Əliabad, Saatly =

Aliabad
- Municipality
- Azerbaijani: Əliabad
- Location within Azerbaijan
- Coordinates: 39°52′N 48°28′E
- Country: Azerbaijan
- District: Saatly

Population
  - Total: 1,252
- Time zone: UTC+4 (AZT)
  - Summer (DST): UTC+5 (AZT)

Aliabad is a village and municipality in the Saatly District of Azerbaijan.

== Description ==
It has a population of 1,252.
