= Əliabad, Bilasuvar =

Aliabad
- Municipality
- Azerbaijani: Əliabad
- Location within Azerbaijan
- Coordinates: 39°28′46″N 48°34′35″E
- Country: Azerbaijan
- District: Bilasuvar

Population
  - Total: 1,156
- Time zone: UTC+4 (AZT)

Aliabad is a village and municipality in the Bilasuvar District of Azerbaijan. It has a population of 1,156.
