= Çaylı, Aghdara =

Chayly / Aygestan Çaylı / Այգեստան
- Location within Azerbaijan Location within Karabakh Economic Region
- Coordinates: 40°20′11″N 46°49′22″E
- Country: Azerbaijan
- District: Aghdara
- Time zone: UTC+4 (AZT)

Chayly (Azerbaijani: Çaylı, also Chaylu) or Aygestan (Armenian: Այգեստան) is a village in the Aghdara District of Azerbaijan, in the disputed region of Nagorno-Karabakh. Prior to 2023, the village was on the ceasefire line between the armed forces of the breakaway state Republic of Artsakh and those of Azerbaijan.

== History ==
The village was founded in 1827 by Armenians who fled from the Iranian Khoy County north of Lake Urmia and resettled in the Russian Empire. During the Soviet period, the village was a part of the Mardakert District of the Nagorno-Karabakh Autonomous Oblast.

During the First Nagorno-Karabakh War, the village's Armenian population fled after Azerbaijani troops stormed the settlement on 16 June 1992. In 2001, refugees from the village founded a new settlement they named Nor Aygestan (Armenian: Նոր Այգեստան, lit. 'New Aygestan', Mollalar in Azerbaijani), in the Martakert Province of the Republic of Artsakh, with 90-95% of its population originating from Aygestan/Çaylı. The village was part of a set of villages of displaced Armenians who relocated to the Aghdam District, which was largely captured by Armenian forces during the First Nagorno-Karabakh War. This district, including the area of Nor Aygestan, was previously inhabited by Azerbaijanis. In 1979, there only used to be 284 non-Azerbaijanis in the countryside of the whole district (0.4% of the population). The village of Nor Agyestan was surrendered to Azerbaijan on the basis of the terms of the 2020 Nagorno-Karabakh ceasefire agreement after the 2020 Nagorno-Karabakh war.

During the ceasefire of the Bishkek Protocol of 1994 until 2020, there have been multiple allegations of ceasefire violations in the village's vicinity. The village was also part of the 2010 Mardakert clashes. The Armenian forces nevertheless managed to hold or regain control over the nearby frontline, until the 2020 Nagorno-Karabakh war when Azerbaijan claimed that their forces had captured the entire village.

== Notable people ==
- Yuri Sahakyan — Armenian writer
