= Bilasuvar District =

District in southeastern Azerbaijan

Coordinates: 39°27′N 48°32′E

- District
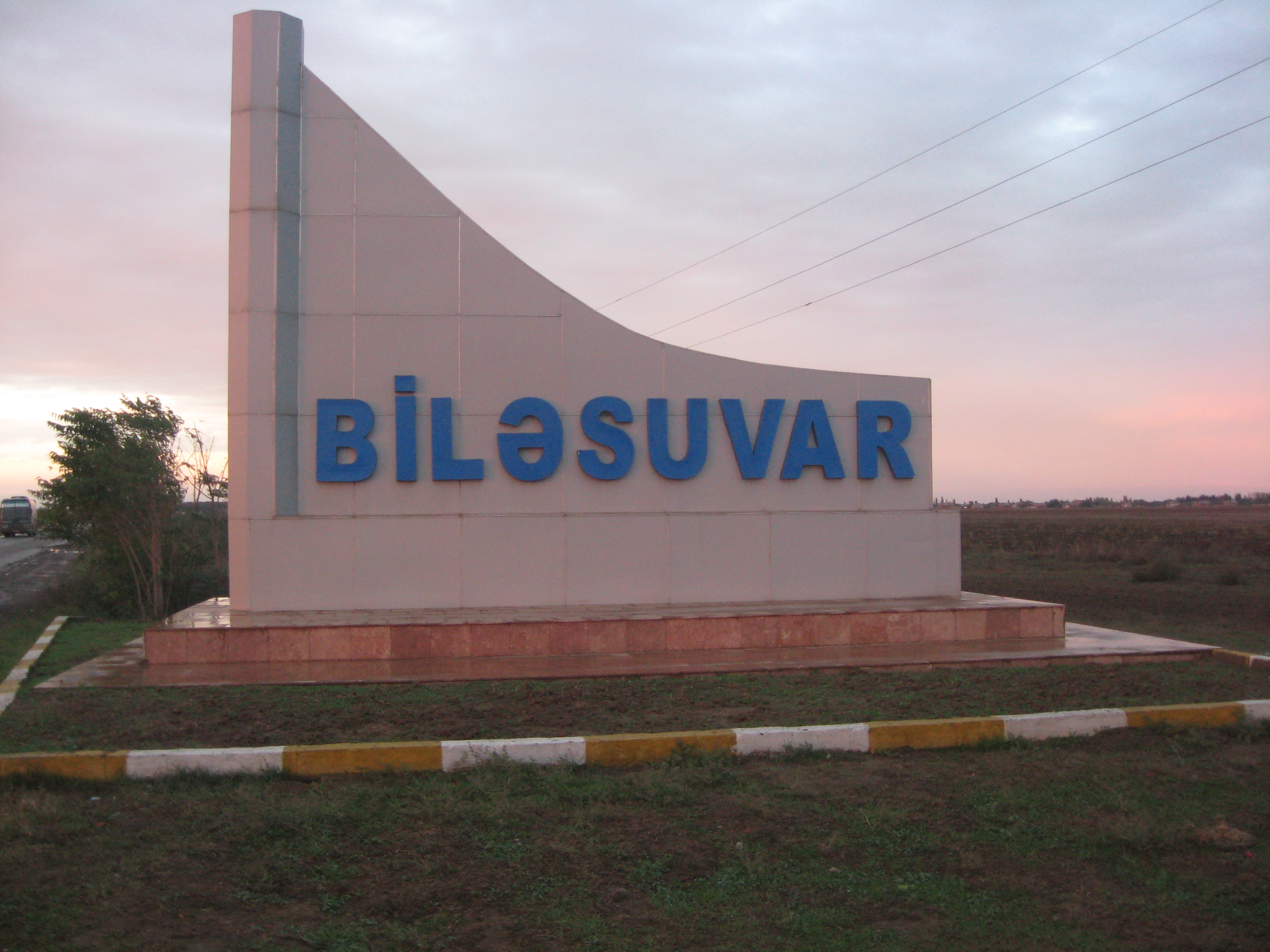

- Map of Azerbaijan showing Bilasuvar District
- Country: Azerbaijan
- Region: Shirvan-Salyan
- Established: 8 August 1930
- Capital: Bilasuvar
- Settlements: 26

Government
  - Governor: Faig Gurbatov

Area
  - Total: 1,360 km^{2} (530 sq mi)

Population (2020)
  - Total: 105,100
  - Density: 77.3/km^{2} (200/sq mi)
- Time zone: UTC+4 (AZT)
- Postal code: 1300
- Website: bilesuvar-ih.gov.az

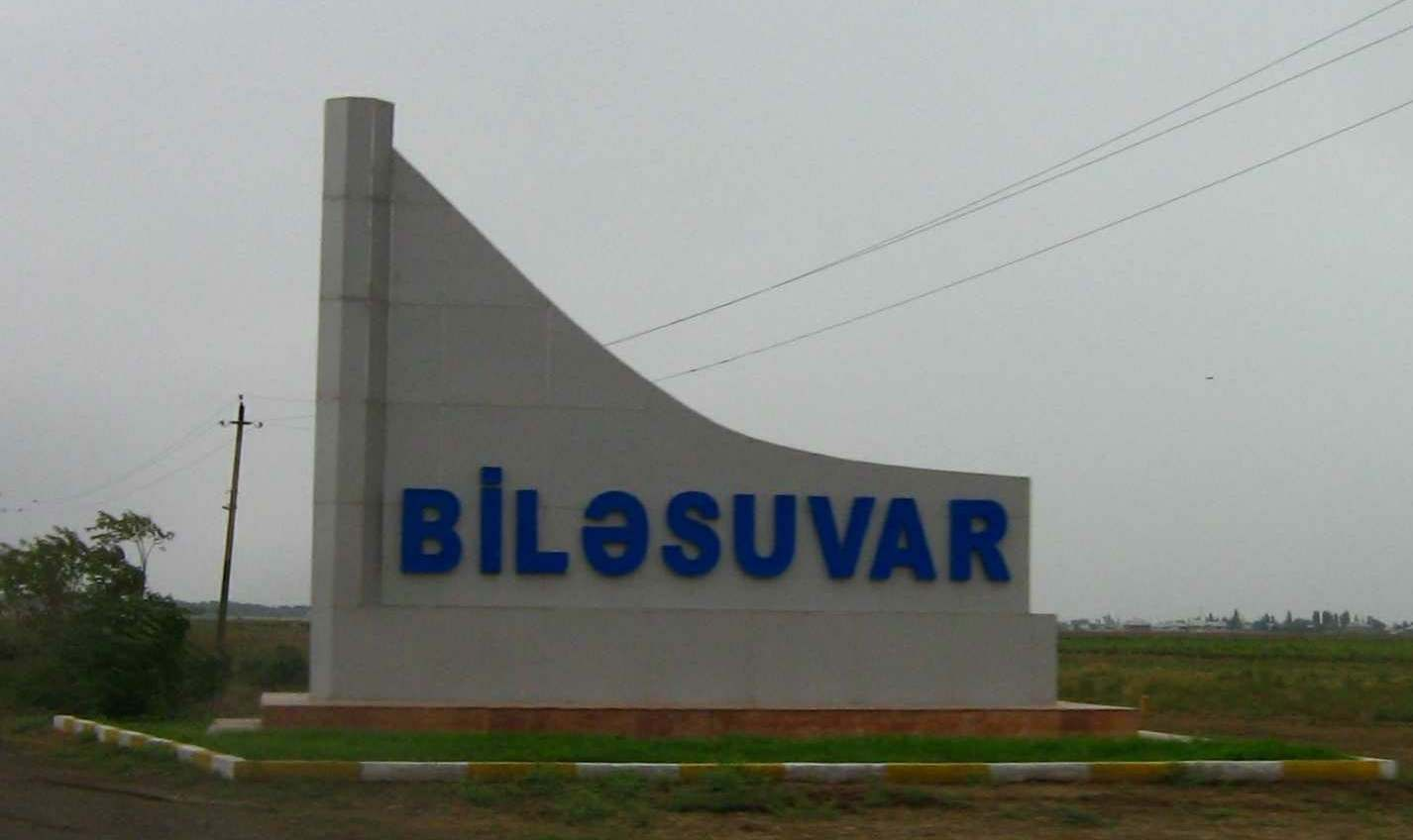
Road sign at the entrance to Bilasuvar District

Bilasuvar District (Azerbaijani: Biləsuvar rayonu) is one of the 66 districts of Azerbaijan. It is located in the south-east of the country, in the Shirvan-Salyan Economic Region. The district borders the districts of Imishli, Saatly, Sabirabad, Salyan, Neftchala, Jalilabad, and Ardabil Province of Iran. Its capital and largest city is Bilasuvar. As of 2020, the district had a population of 105,100.

== Etymology ==
The district is named after its capital city Bilasuvar. "Bile" is derived from the Turkish word “bilya” which means lowland, while "suvar" means a "cavalryman". According to Azerbaijani sources, 10,000 cavalrymen were deployed in these lowlands during the reign of Sassanid shah (king) Khosrow I.

== Geography ==
Total area of the district is 1358 km^{2}. It occupies the south-western and southern part of the Mugan plain. The total length of the borders is 241 km.

An international customs post is located in the Bilasuvar District territory.

The climate of Bilasuvar is rather hot, with dry summers. Temperature varies from 2 °C (in winter) to 26 °C(in summer) with average rainfall 260mm. The main types of soil in Bilasuvar are chestnut soils, grey meadow, steppe saline soils.

Most of the area of the district is below the sea level, 542 hectares of which are forests. Forests have many animals, including deer, bears, boars, goats, wolves, etc.

== History ==
The Persian historian Hamdullah Qazvini wrote that the medieval urban settlement of Bilasuvar was established by the emir of Buveyhi, Pilasuvar in the 10th century, and was hence named after him. In the 14th century, the city declined due to feudal civil strife. The name in Turkic means pure water falls, due to the area's numerous rivers, though given the largely flat terrain the reference to waterfalls is somewhat misleading.

In 1930, Bilasuvar District was created with the centre in Pushkin Settlement. In 1938, the district was renamed Pushkin District.

In 1963, the territory was united with Jalilabad District, and in 1964, it became an independent district again. After the collapse of the USSR in 1991, it returned to its historic name and was renamed Bilasuvar District.

Important historical findings include ruins of Shahriyar-tepe which belong to the Middle Ages, the Shakhriyar fortress which was built in the Iron Age, Kosha-tepe mound which also belongs to the Iron Age. In the city of Bilasuvar ruins of Icheri Aghdam village and the Shahriyar, fortress were found. They also belong to the Middle Ages.

== Economy ==
Bilasuvar is mainly an agricultural region. Main economic activities are livestock breeding, grain, and cotton cultivation. In 2017 41298 heads of large and 138927 of small cattle were registered. Overall, fertile soil amount is 113 thousand hectares, 42.5 thousand of which are sown and remaining are used for pastures. In Soviet-era, 4 state farms were operating in region.

A number of agricultural enterprises also operate in the region, such as "LLC Biləsuvar-Aqro", "Azəryoltikinti" (Asphalt Company), the cotton company "Biləsuvar-Pambıq", etc.

== Infrastructure ==
The district has 9 hospitals with 520 beds, 6 medical clinics, and centre for epidemiology, 11 medical centres. Furthermore, the district contains 16 post offices.

== Population ==
According to the State Statistics Committee, as of 2018, the population of city was 102,400 persons, which increased by 26,400 persons (about 34.7 percent) from 76,000 persons in 2000. Of the total population, 51,600 are men and 50,800 are women. More than 26.7 percent of the population (about 27,400 persons) consists of young people and teenagers aged 14–29.

The population of the district by the year (at the beginning of the year, thousand persons)
Territory	2000	2001	2002	2003	2004	2005	2006	2007	2008	2009	2010	2011	2012	2013	2014	2015	2016	2017	2018	2019	2020	2021
Bilasuvar region	76.0	77.0	77.9	78.8	79.9	81.2	82.5	84.0	85.4	87.1	88.7	90.3	92.3	94.0	95.6	97.4	99.2	100.9	102.4	103.8	105.1	106.3
urban population	17.6	17.9	18.1	18.3	18.6	18.9	19.2	19.5	19.7	20.0	20.3	20.6	20.9	21.2	21.5	21.8	22.2	22.6	22.8	23.1	23.3	23.5
rural population	58.4	59.1	59.8	60.5	61.3	62.3	63.3	64.5	65.7	67.1	68.4	69.7	71.4	72.8	74.1	75.6	77.0	78.3	79.6	80.7	81.8	82.8

== Notable natives ==
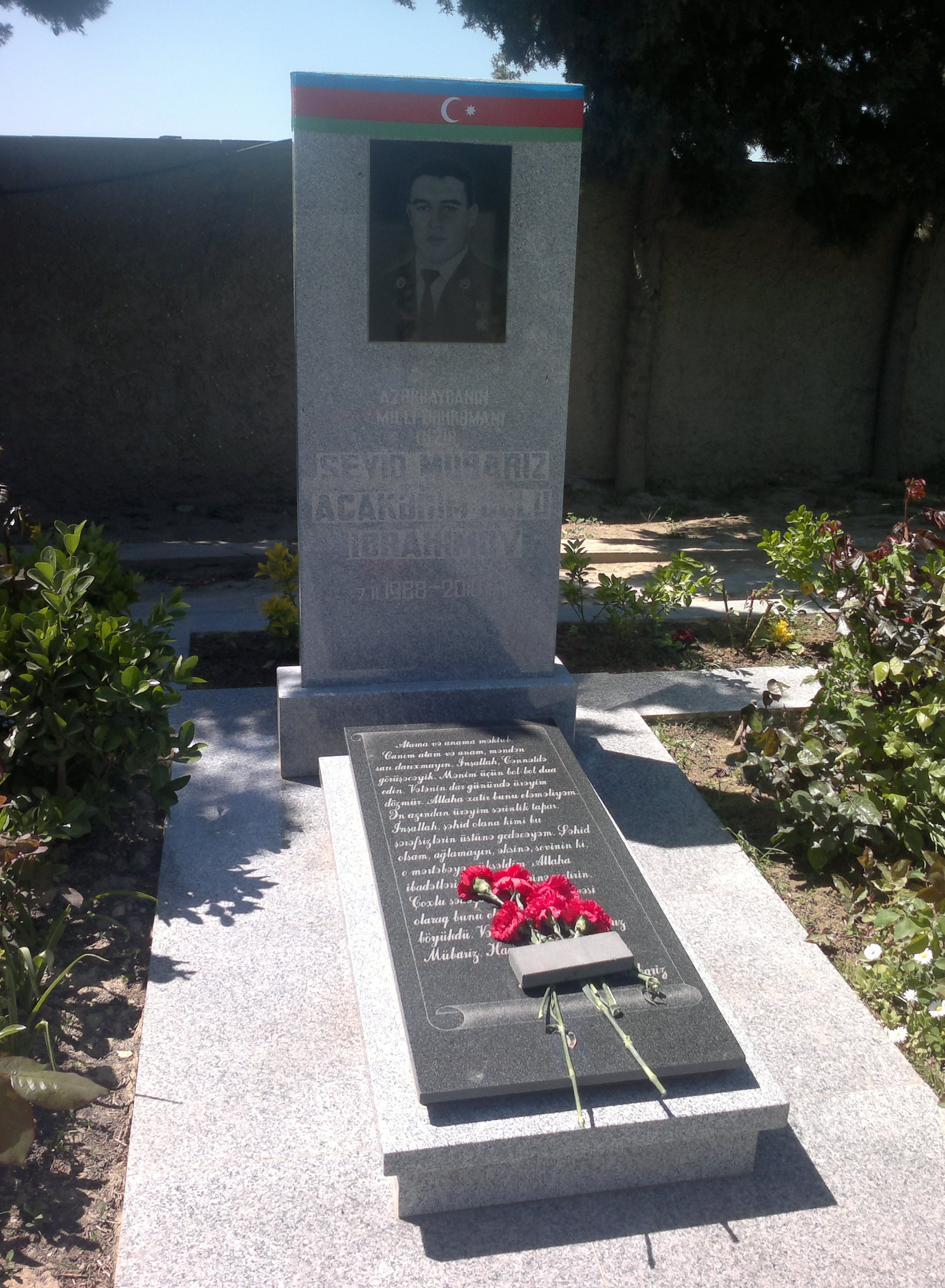
Mubariz Ibrahimov - Azerbaijani Warrant Officer and National Hero of Azerbaijan
