= Saatlı =

Saatlı may refer to:

- Saatly Rayon, Azerbaijan
- Saatlı (city), capital of Saatly Rayon
- Saatlı, Barda, Azerbaijan
