= Ətcələr =

Ətcələr or Etchelyar or Etcheler or Echelyar or Atcalar may refer to:

- Ətcələr, Jalilabad, Azerbaijan
- Ətcələr, Masally, Azerbaijan
- Ətcələr, Sabirabad, Azerbaijan
