= Upland Cemetery =

- Azerbaijani: Dağüstü qəbiristanlığı
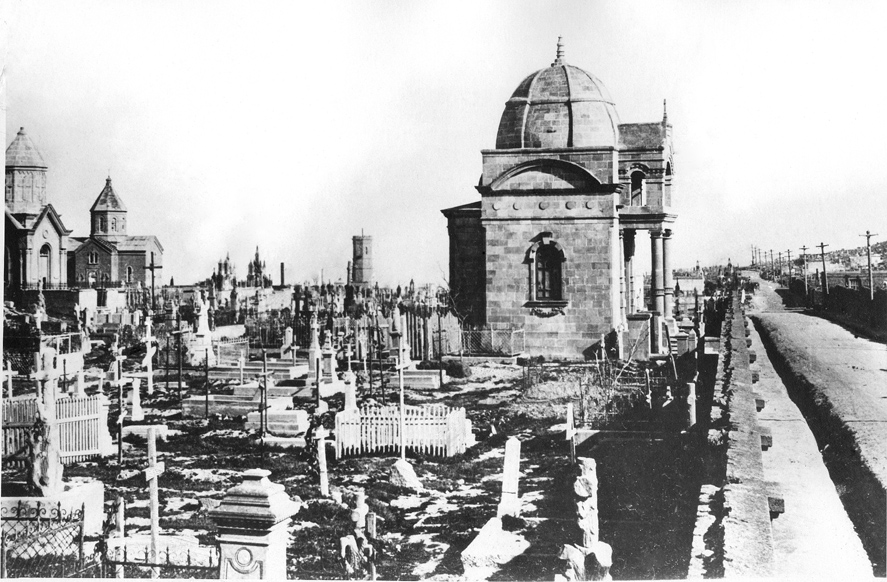
- Interactive map of Upland Cemetery

Details
- Established: 1883
- Abandoned: demolished in the first half of the 1930s
- Location: Baku
- Country: Azerbaijan
- Coordinates: 40°21′26″N 49°49′45″E
- Size: 0.160 km²

The Upland Cemetery. (Azerbaijani: Dağüstü qəbiristanlığı) or the Pir-Vanzari Cemetery was a multi-confessional cemetery located in Baku until the first half of the 1930s. The cemetery was placed on the top of the Baku hill, known as Pirvanzari, situated to the southwest of the Chemberekend village, a suburb of Baku.

On the Baku urban plan of 1899, compiled by the city engineer the Colonel Nikolai von der Nonne, it can be seen that the cemetery during this period consisted of a number of sections: Muslim, Orthodox, Catholic, Lutheran, Jewish and Molokan. Also, on the territory of the cemetery were located several chapels.

In the first half of the 1930s, the cemetery was demolished, and a park named after Sergei Kirov was laid out on this site. In 1990, the bodies of the Black January tragedy victims, and subsequently those who died during the Karabakh war, were buried in the former Muslim part of the cemetery. Today, this area is known as the Martyrs' Alley.

== Cemetery’s history ==
=== History of occurrence ===
In the August issues of the Baku newspaper "Kaspiy" in 1882, it was noted that the location of the Chemberekend cemetery in the proximity to the residential buildings is harmful for the population's health. The newspaper, in particular, noted that the cemeteries, especially the Russian ones, begin directly from the roofs of the outer city houses, and to enter the cemetery from the embankment, it is enough to climb the front steps of the first house, to jump directly on the graves from the last step, and with only a small step from the roof of those houses is enough to find yourself in the cemetery.

Many residents told the newspaper correspondents that during intense heat, there was a strong stench coming from cadaver decomposition. It was also pointed out that the cemetery did not have a special section for those who died due to epidemic diseases. The newspaper proposed to allocate a new place for the cemetery behind the crest of the same mountain, on the slope of which the cemetery was located.

On 27 September 1882, at the second regular meeting of the Baku City Duma, the issue of transferring the Chemberekend cemetery to a new location was considered. A new location was chosen.

In the June issue of the newspaper "Kaspiy" in 1883, the Baku city government announced that, as a result of the decision of the Sanitary Committee and according to the verdicts of the Baku City Duma, all Muslim and Christian cemeteries existing near Baku under the suburb of Chemberekend were closed forever from 1 July. New burials had to be made in the newly selected places in the area of the Pirken-Zari Mount (Pirvanzari) above Chemberekend. Buring people in the old cemeteries was already strictly forbidden.

=== Further history ===
On 8 August 1883, a chapel for the corpses' dissection was opened at the cemetery, where all the dead were sent to be autopsied. The premise of the Mikhailovskaya hospital, where the corpses were dissected before, was closed.

In the early 1910s, on the site of the Muslim part of the Chemberekend cemetery, it was decided to build an edifice for the Saadet Muslim religious school. On a Friday, people gathered at the cemetery, the akhund read a prayer after which the relatives and friends of the deceased transferred the remains to the Upland cemetery, the empty graves were razed to the ground and on 23 December 1912, the foundation of the school's building was laid.

In 1918, the bodies of the March events' victims were buried in the Muslim section of the cemetery. In September of the same year, the bodies of the Turkish soldiers of the Ottoman Empire who died in the battle for Baku were buried in the cemetery (in 1999, a memorial obelisk was raised on this site), and the bodies of the British soldiers who died in the same battle were buried in the cemetery (today the Flame Towers are located on that place)

=== Demolition of the cemetery ===
In the first half of the 20th century, the Upland cemetery was demolished, and on its place the Upland Park named after S. M. Kirov was laid out. The design of this park was initiated in 1931 by the architect Lev Ilyin. According to Ilyin himself, on the first day of his second visit to Baku, the top of the Baku Hill was an abandoned area “where forgotten tombstones laid side by side”. In those years, it was noted that these old cemeteries had long outlived all the terms established for their existence and occupied an unjustly dominant position over the entire city. Later, a monument to Sergei Kirov was raised on the territory of the new park and the "Friendship of People" restaurant was built

Many bodies were reburied in other cemeteries of the city, for example, the body of Musa Nagiyev was reburied in the cemetery of the village of Bilajary. The remains of a number of famous personalities, such as Huseyn Arablinski, Jalil Mammadguluzadeh, Abdurrahim bey Hagverdiyev, were reburied in the Alley of Honor. However, the graves of such people as Samad bey Mehmandarov, Zivar bay Ahmadbeyov, and Alirza Rasizade were lost.

In 1990, in the former Muslim part of the cemetery, the bodies of the Black January tragedy victims, and subsequently of those who died during the Karabakh conflict, were buried. Today, this area is known as the Martyrs' Alley.

== See also ==
- Alley of Honor
- Chemberekend Cemetery
- Ancient Muslim cemetery (Baku)
- German prisoners of war cemetery (Baku)
