= Tverskoy =

Tverskoy (masculine), Tverskaya (feminine), or Tverskoye (neuter) may refer to:

- Tverskoy District, a district in Central Administrative Okrug of the federal city of Moscow, Russia
- Tverskoy Boulevard, one of the main thoroughfares in central Moscow
- Tver Oblast (Tverskaya oblast), a federal subject of Russia
- Tverskaya Street, a street in Moscow, Russia
- Tverskaya (Moscow Metro), a station on the Zamoskvoretskaya Line of the Moscow Metro, Moscow, Russia
- Tverskoy, Russia (Tverskaya, Tverskoye), several rural localities in Russia
- Tverskoye, former name of Şirinbəyli, a village in Azerbaijan
- Julia Tverskaya (born 1959), Moscow born American chess player

== See also ==
- Tver
