= Kamallı =

Kamallı or Kemally or Kyamally or Kayamally may refer to:

- Kamallı, Lachin, Azerbaijan
- Kamallı, Saatly, Azerbaijan
