= Qıraqlı =

Qıraqlı or Kyragly or Kyrakhly or Kragly may refer to:

- Qıraqlı, Khachmaz, Azerbaijan
- Qıraqlı, Saatly, Azerbaijan
