= Moranlı =

Moranlı or Moranly or Muranly may refer to:

- Moranlı, Jalilabad, Azerbaijan
- Moranlı, Sabirabad, Azerbaijan
