= Gomuşçu =

Gomuşçu or Gomushchu or Gemyushchi or Gyumushchi may refer to:

- Gomuşçu, Saatly, Azerbaijan
- Gomuşçu, Sabirabad, Azerbaijan
- Gomuşçu, Salyan, Azerbaijan
