= Azadkənd =

Azadkənd or Azadkend may refer to:

- Azadkənd, Nakhchivan, Azerbaijan
- Azadkənd, Saatly, Azerbaijan
- Azadkənd, Sabirabad, Azerbaijan
