= German prisoners of war in Azerbaijan =

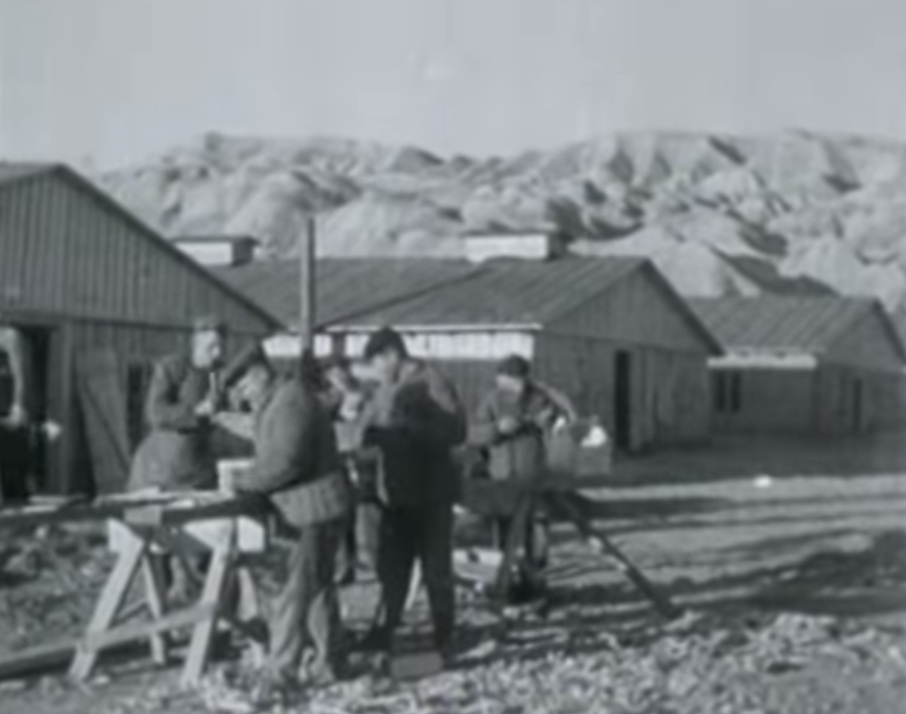
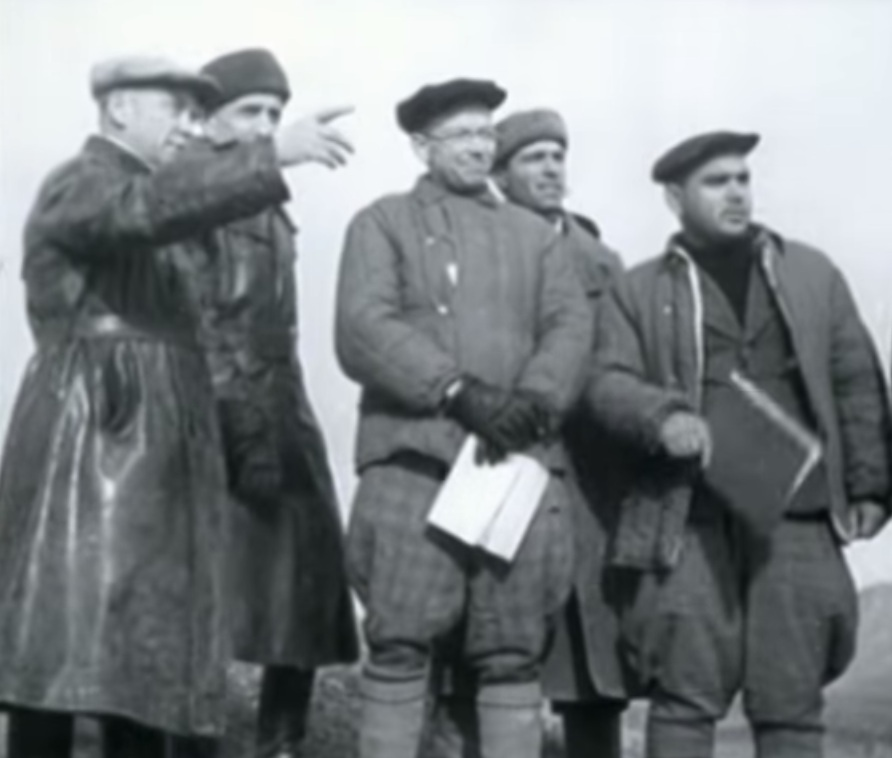

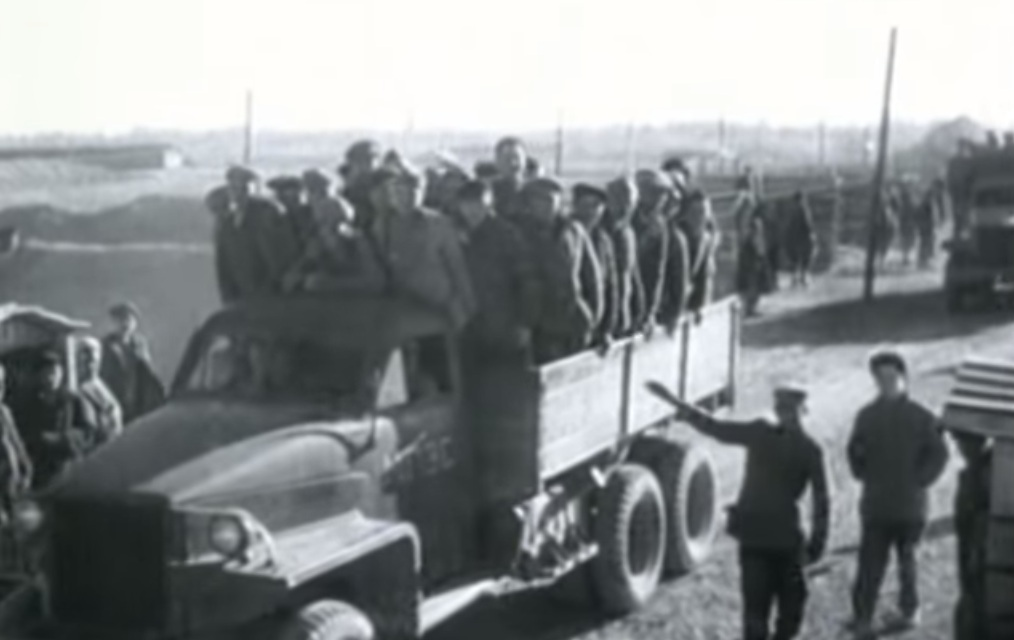
German prisoners in Mingachevir

German prisoners of war in Azerbaijan (German: Deutsche Kriegsgefangene in Aserbaidschan) are former servicemen of Nazi Germany captured by Soviet troops during World War II and kept on the territory of the Azerbaijan Soviet Socialist Republic.

== History of the prisoners of war in Azerbaijan ==
=== Arrival and accommodation ===
According to the historian Tair Behbudov, who is studying the fate of the German prisoners of war arrived to Azerbaijan, there were about 42 thousand German prisoners of war arrived to Baku. As noted by the historian Javid Bagirzadeh, the dispatch of the German prisoners of war to Azerbaijan consisted of two stages: the first group of the German prisoners of war arrived in 1944, the second in 1945. The latest arrived in the early 1945 from the central regions of Russia. Wounded prisoners of war were sent to Baku, some of whom later died due to their wounds.

As of January 1947, in Azerbaijan there were 23,266 Axis prisoners of war of various nationalities (Germans, Austrians, Hungarians, Romanians). According to the archival data, as of 1 January 1947, in the operational service of the Ministry of Internal Affairs of the Azerbaijan SSR there were 3 prisoner of war camps numbered 223, 328, 444, hospitals for prisoners of war numbered 1552, 5030 and medical units numbered 468, 498. These objects were located in Baku (German Stadtlager), Kirovabad, Sumgait (German Zweiglager), Mingachevir (German Kura-Stauseelager), Nukha (German Zweiglager), Khanlar (German Berglager Gil-Gil) and Salyan (German Wüstenlager).

The daily ration for one prisoner of war was 90 g of vermicelli, 10 g of fish, 15 g of lard, 15 g of butter, 30 g of salt, 600 g of potatoes and 320 g of vegetables. On large construction sites, there were additional rations allocated from the facility fund for the prisoners of war, and in order to maintain the health of the prisoners of war, the NKVD of Azerbaijan sometimes sent them for extra work to vegetable and food warehouses. Nevertheless, the health of most of the prisoners of war was seriously affected, they suffered from tuberculosis, dysentery, pleurisy and other diseases. The residents of Baku and Mingachevir, despite the ban, fed the weakened German prisoners of war walking along the street or working on sites. So, the actor and film director Vladimir Menshov recalls that, as a child, he exchanged bread for wooden toys with German prisoners of war who worked on the construction site of the Government House.

=== Participation in construction works ===
The prisoners of war in Azerbaijan were involved in various construction work. They worked on the construction of civil buildings, large industrial facilities and special closed facilities.

German prisoners of war played an important role in the construction of the city of Mingachevir itself. Here, with their help were built parks, squares, five-story and two-story residential areas, a palace of culture, government institutions, etc. In the city of Guba, the German prisoners of war built a cinema and an open-air cinema, as well as a terrace of 40 steps connecting the city center with the village Krasnaya Sloboda.

In Baku, the prisoners of war participated in the construction of buildings such as the Government House, the residential building of the Buzovnyneft trust, the actors residential house on Bakikhanov Street, the Bolshoy Dvor residential area complex on Stroiteley Avenue, etc. In particular, in the construction of the Government House, according to Behbudov, about 150 prisoners of war took part, performing the roles of civil engineers, carpenters, stone cutters, facade craftsmen, etc. According to the archival data, to which Behbudov refers to, the prisoners of war were led to the construction site every day on foot from prison, located in the Black City, where they returned in the evening.

Buildings in Azerbaijan, in the construction of which took part German prisoners of war

Government House, Baku

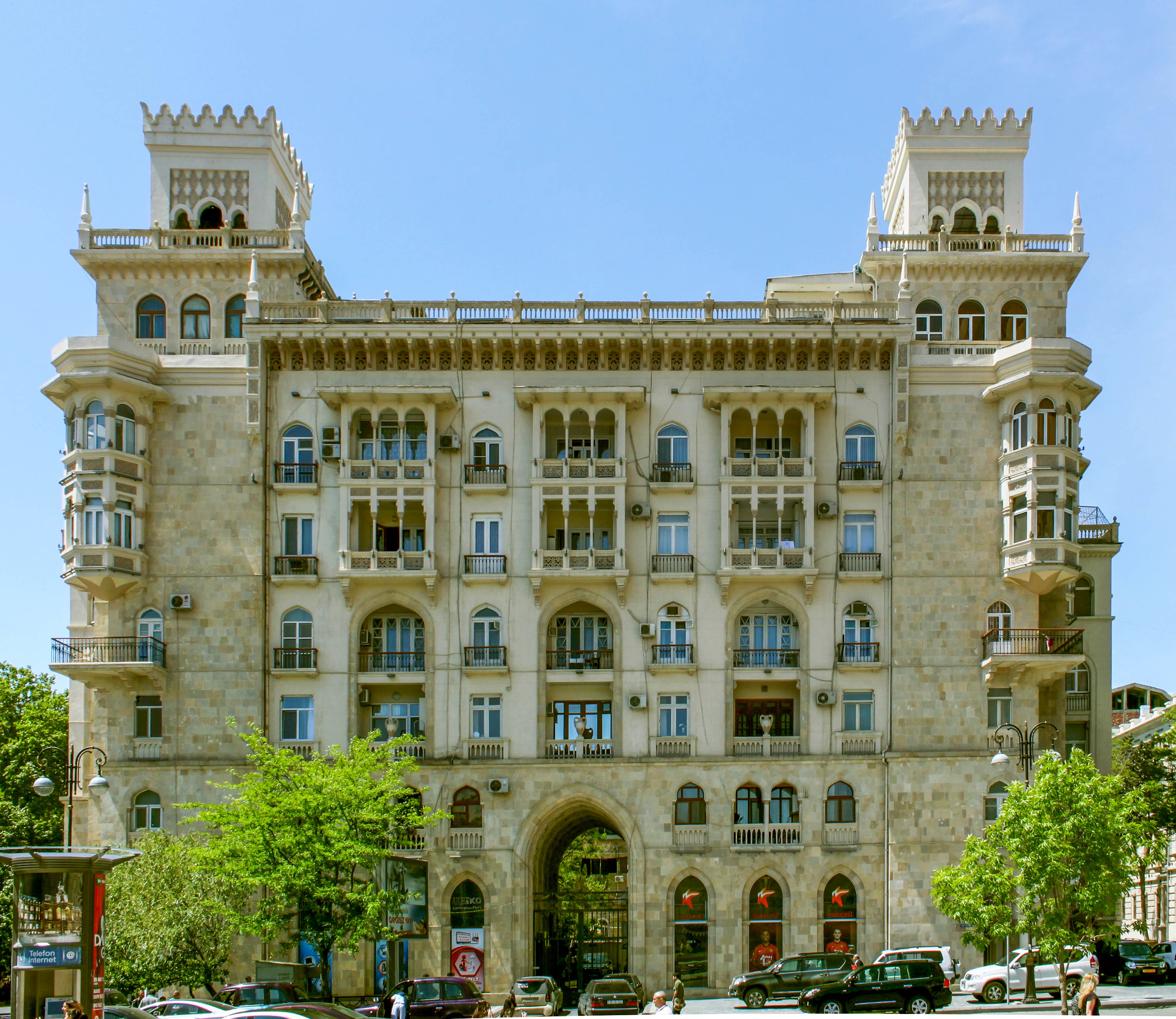
Residential building of the Buzovnaneft

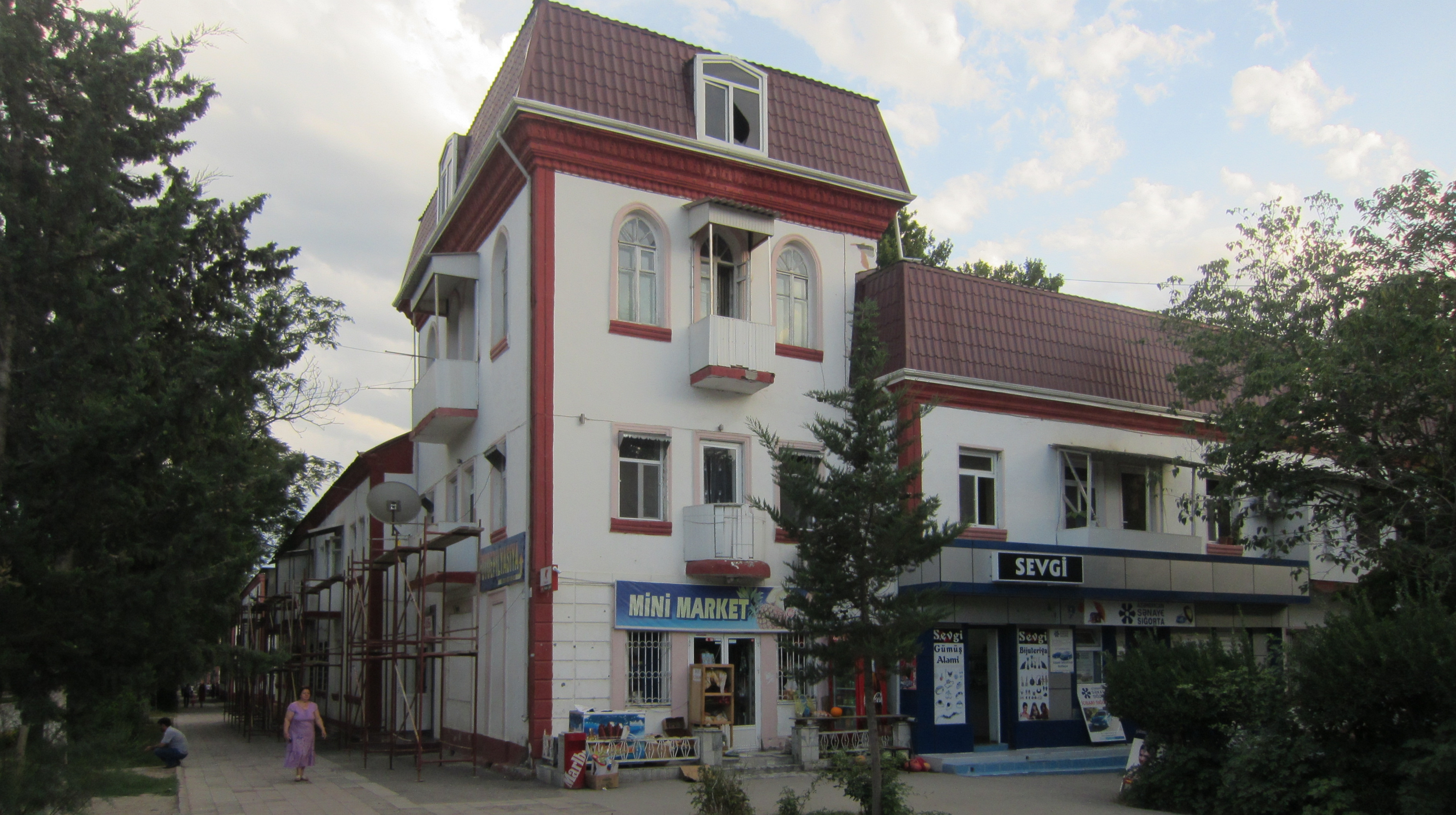
Residential buildings in Mingachevir

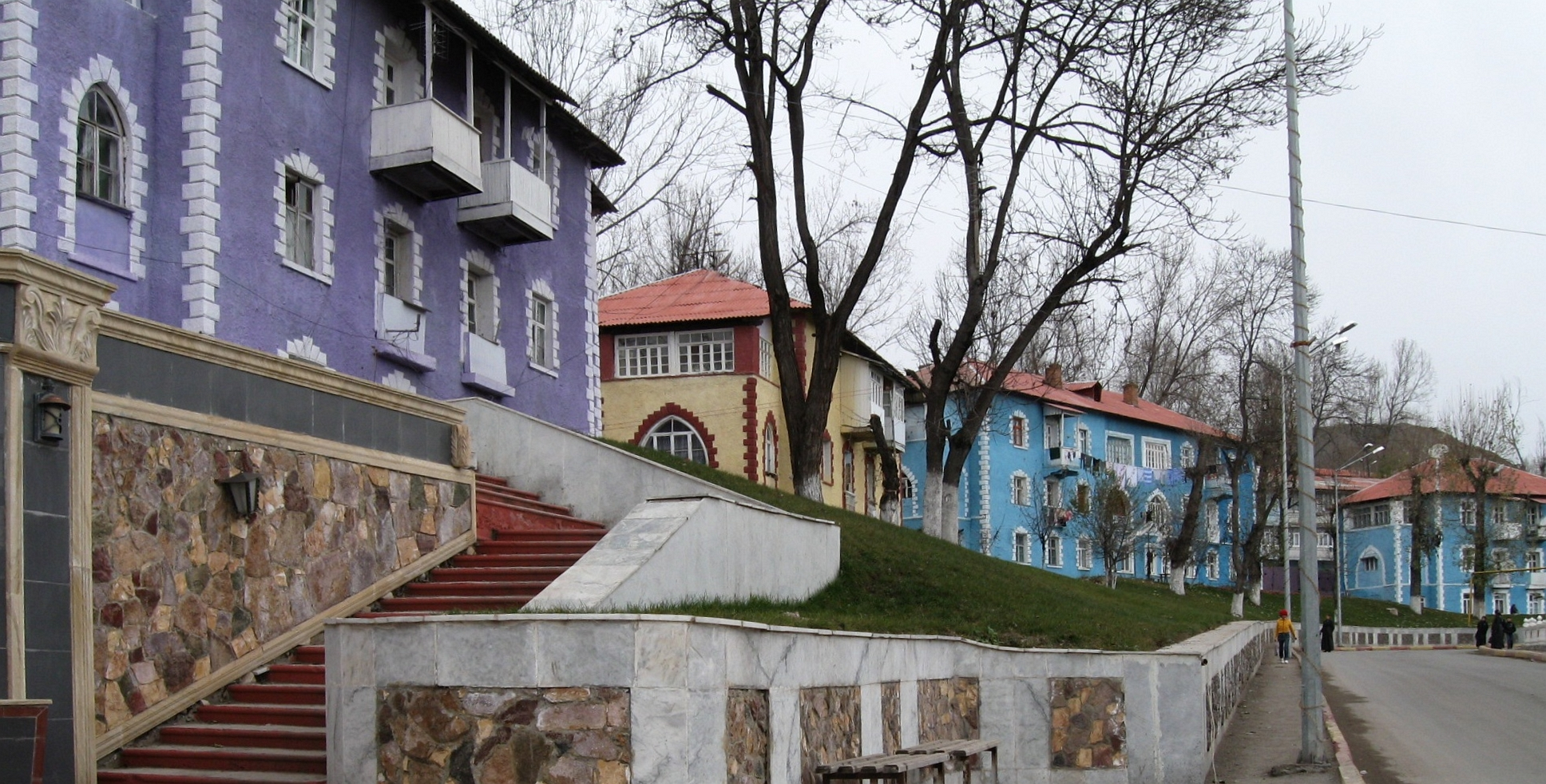
Residential buildings in Dashkasan

=== Repatriation of the prisoners of war ===
The adoption of such documents as the UN General Assembly Resolution on the Extradition of the Prisoners of War and the Punishment of War Criminals (13 February 1946), the 1947 Treaty on Peace Agreements of the Anti-Hitler Coalition with Italy, Finland, Romania, Hungary and Bulgaria, the 1949 Geneva Convention, was the main reason for repatriation of the German prisoners of war. Consequently, in the USSR, the full-scale release of the prisoners of war began. First of all, the anti-fascists and the leaders of production were released, then - the weakened, chronically ill and disabled.

In Azerbaijan, the process of releasing the prisoners of war and returning them to their homeland, according to the reports of the NKVD of Azerbaijan, began partially already in 1945. However, since 1946, their repatriation has become more active. In January and February 1947, 2000 weakened and sick Germans were removed from Azerbaijan. According to the Minister of Internal Affairs of the USSR Sergei Kruglov Order No. 001078, issued on 15 October 1947, 1750 prisoners of war in Azerbaijan were subject to repatriation (1,000 of them from camps, 400 from the Individual Workers' Battalions, 350 from special hospitals). By the decision of the Council of Ministers of the USSR No. 396-152ss of 1948, 3500 German prisoners of war, who suffered greatly from dystrophy, were selected in the camps of the NKVD of Azerbaijan to be sent from Azerbaijan to their homeland. From May 1948 to August of the same year, 1800 prisoners of war were repatriated from the construction sites of the Mingachevir hydroelectric power station, 550 from the Sumgait pipe-rolling plant, 300 from Dashkesanstroy, and 950 from Glavneftestroy.

== Cemeteries for German prisoners of war ==
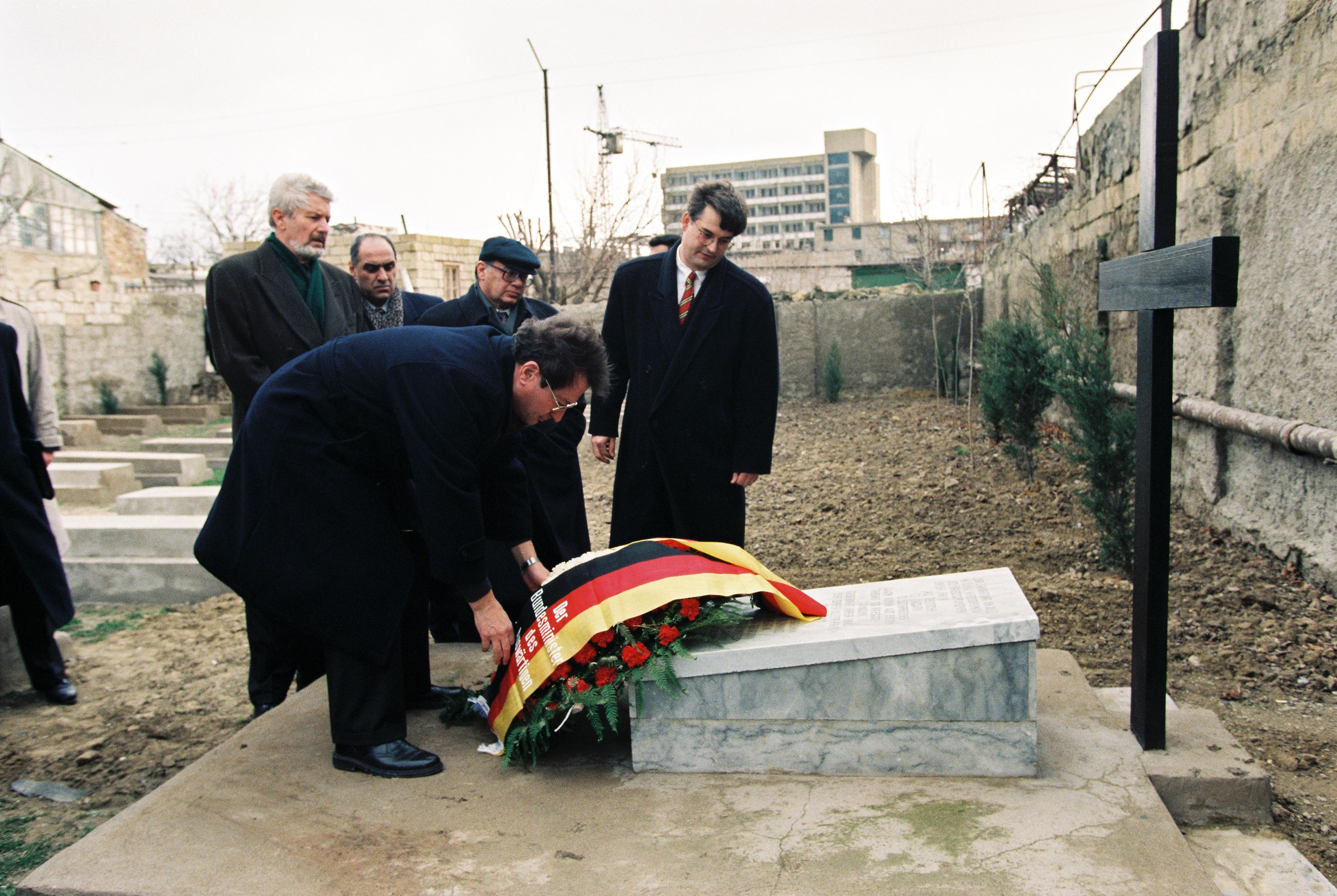
The Minister of Foreign Affairs of Germany, Klaus Kinkel, lays a wreath at the memorial located at cemetery of German prisoners of war in Baku. 22 December 1995

Today in different places of Azerbaijan there are located cemeteries of German prisoners of war. These cemeteries mainly arose where prisoners of war were involved in construction works. On 22 December 1995, the foreign ministers of Azerbaijan, Hasan Hasanov, and Germany, Klaus Kinkel, signed an agreement on the protection of the graves of the German prisoners of war on the territory of Azerbaijan.

There are cemeteries for German prisoners of war in the cities of Mingachevir, Alat (11 graves), in the Yasamal region of Baku (90 graves), etc. In Baku, there was another cemetery located on the Darnagul highway, which was subsequently filled up. Nowadays, a metal-smelting plant is located on this place. Also, prisoners of war cemeteries are located in the cities of Guba and Khachmaz, but their exact location is unknown.

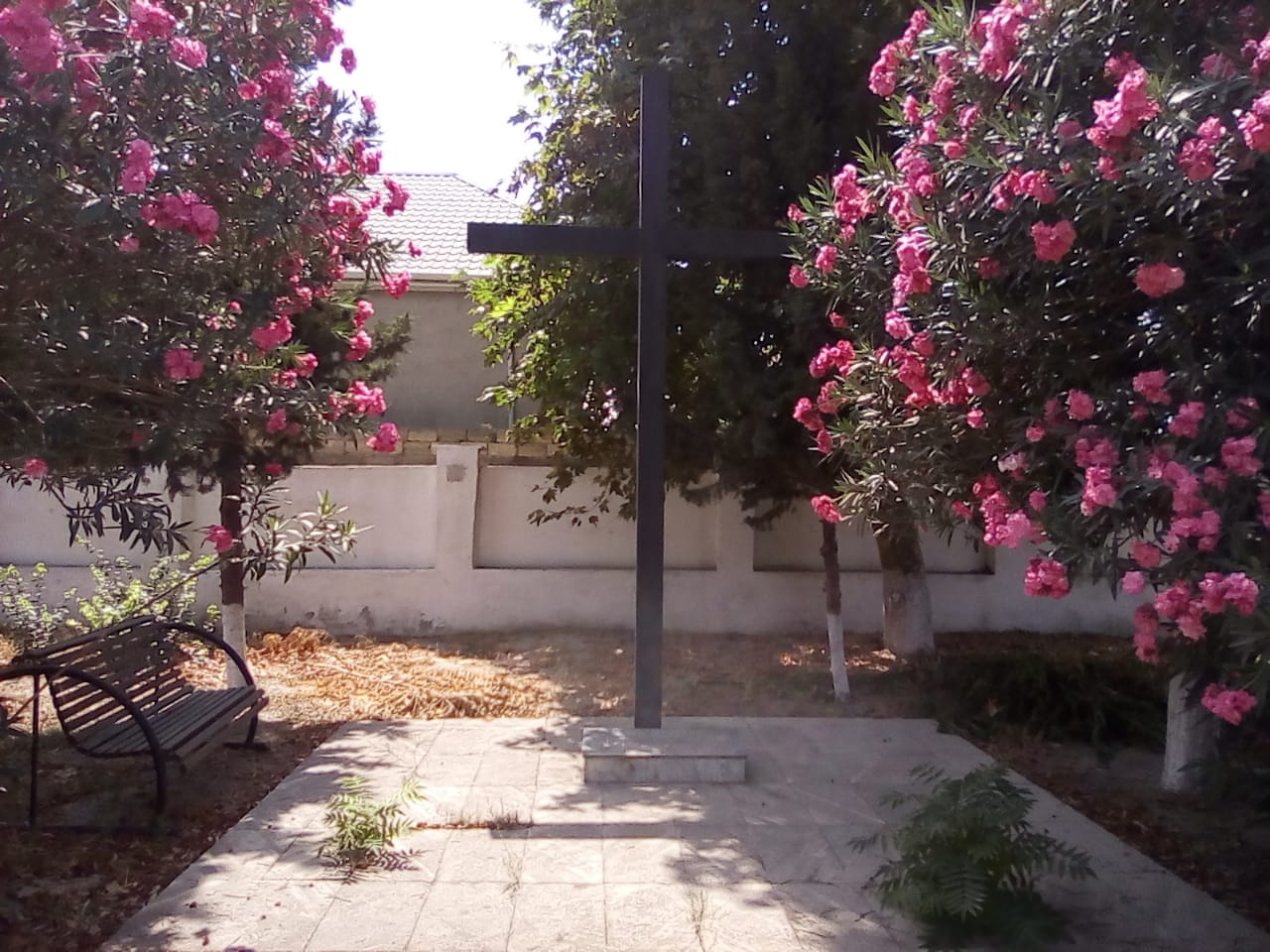
German prisoners cemetery in Sumgait

At the cemetery of Sumgait, where prisoners of war worked at the pipe-rolling plant, there are now the graves of 311 prisoners of war. 828 prisoners of war rest in the cemetery of prisoners of war in Mingachevir, which was restored in 1999. A memorial has also been erected on the territory of this cemetery, it represents a metal cross of 5.5 m high.

A cemetery for prisoners of war with an area of about 1 hectare exists in the city of Goygol. It was renovated in 1996. People of nine nationalities (Germans, Poles, Hungarians, Czechs, Swedes, Slovaks, Italians, French and Austrians) are buried here. In the Goygol region, there are two more cemeteries for prisoners of war, located at the junction of the villages of Balchyly and Bahrambek. On the first one rest about four hundred prisoners of war, and above each grave there is a metal plaque with the number of the prisoner. 160 prisoners of war are buried in the neighboring cemetery.

About 200 prisoners of war were kept in the Jafarkhan village of the Saatli region, in a building called the Laboratory. In the village, they were involved in various kinds of rural work, and later died here and were buried in a separate cemetery that has survived to this day. At the entrance to the cemetery there is a sign in German and Azerbaijani languages Cemetery of World War Prisoners (German: Weltkrieg Kriegsgefangenen Friedhof, Azerbaijani: Dünya müharibəsində əsir düşmüşlərin qəbiristanlığı).

== See also ==
- German prisoners of war in the Soviet Union
- German prisoners of war in northwest Europe
- German prisoners of war in the United States
