= Balçılı =

Balçılı may refer to:

- Balçılı, Goygol, Azerbaijan
- Balçılı, Yevlakh, Azerbaijan
