= Seversky =

Seversky (masculine), Severskaya (feminine), or Severskoye (neuter) may refer to:

- Alexander P. de Seversky (1894–1974), Russian-American aviation pioneer
- Seversky Aircraft, the aircraft company founded by de Seversky, which later became Republic Aviation
- Seversky District, a district of Krasnodar Krai, Russia
- Seversky (inhabited locality) (Severskaya, Severskoye), name of several rural localities in Russia
- Severskoye, Azerbaijan, a village in Azerbaijan

== See also ==
- Seversk
