= Eucommiidites =

Eucommiidites Temporal range: 242.0–89.3 Ma

Scientific classification
- Kingdom: Plantae
- Clade: Tracheophytes
- Order: †Erdtmanithecales
- Genus: †Eucommiidites; Erdtman 1948

Species
- †Eucommiidites minor; †Eucommiidites stuartii; †Eucommiidites troedssonii

Extinct genus of cycads

Eucommiidites is an angiosperm look-alike pollen type from the Mesozoic Era. When it was first described in Sweden, it was thought to represent pollen from the earliest angiosperms. However, it was subsequently shown, due to morphology, that it could not be angiospermous. Later, Eucommidites pollen was discovered in the pollen chambers of fossil gymnosperm seeds. It was later shown to be the pollen of the extinct gymnosperm order Erdtmanithecales, suggested to have close affinities with Bennettitales and Gnetales.

Eucommidites is tricolpate, which is why it was originally thought to be angiospermous. However, the three colpi are not equal in length, and the exine of the pollen grain is similar to a gymnosperm.

Eucommidites is important in biostratigraphy, and it ranges from the Triassic to the Cretaceous.
