= Kichik Kovlyar =

- Location within Azerbaijan
- Coordinates: 40°05′27″N 48°32′55″E
- Country: Azerbaijan
- Rayon: Sabirabad
- Time zone: UTC+4 (AZT)
  - Summer (DST): UTC+5 (AZT)

Kichik Kovlyar (also, Kichik Kovlar) is a village in the Sabirabad Rayon of Azerbaijan.
