= Novodonetskoye =

- Location within Azerbaijan
- Coordinates: 39°57′51″N 48°38′44″E
- Country: Azerbaijan
- Rayon: Sabirabad
- Time zone: UTC+4 (AZT)
  - Summer (DST): UTC+5 (AZT)

Novodonetskoye (also, Novo-Donepskoe) is a village in the Sabirabad Rayon of Azerbaijan.
