= Beyler =

Beyler can refer to:

- Beyler, Buldan
- Beyler, Elmalı
- Beyler, İnebolu
- Beyler, Narman
- Bəylər
