= Baylar =

Baylar may refer to:

- Bəylər, Azerbaijan
- Baylar, Iran
- Baylar, Qazvin, Iran
