= Hacıbəbir =

- Municipality
- Location within Azerbaijan
- Coordinates: 39°52′14″N 48°47′34″E
- Country: Azerbaijan
- Rayon: Sabirabad

Population
  - Total: 379
- Time zone: UTC+4 (AZT)
  - Summer (DST): UTC+5 (AZT)

Hacıbəbir (also, Gadzhi-Babir and Gadzhybabir) is a village and municipality in the Sabirabad Rayon of Azerbaijan. It has a population of 379.
