= Osmanlı, Azerbaijan =

Village and municipality in Sabirabad Rayon, Azerbaijan

Coordinates: 39°58′N 48°50′E

Osmanli is a village and municipality in the Sabirabad Rayon of Azerbaijan. It has a population of 998.
