= Malyy Talysh =

- Location within Azerbaijan
- Coordinates: 40°02′48″N 48°42′23″E
- Country: Azerbaijan
- Rayon: Sabirabad
- Time zone: UTC+4 (AZT)
  - Summer (DST): UTC+5 (AZT)

Malyy Talysh (also, Kichik-Talysh) is a village in the Sabirabad Rayon of Azerbaijan.
