= Əhmədbəyli =

Əhmədbəyli or Akhmedbeyli may refer to:

- Əhmədbəyli, Fizuli, Azerbaijan
- Əhmədbəyli, Saatly, Azerbaijan
- Əhmədbəyli, Samukh, Azerbaijan
