= Xankeçən =

- Municipality
- Location within Azerbaijan
- Coordinates: 39°45′26″N 48°54′54″E
- Country: Azerbaijan
- Rayon: Sabirabad

Population
  - Total: 1,381
- Time zone: UTC+4 (AZT)
  - Summer (DST): UTC+5 (AZT)

Xankeçən (also Khankechan) is a village and municipality in the Sabirabad Rayon of Azerbaijan. It has a population of 1,381.
