= Əliləmbəyli =

- Municipality
- Location within Azerbaijan
- Coordinates: 39°49′46″N 48°46′51″E
- Country: Azerbaijan
- Rayon: Sabirabad

Population
  - Total: 651
- Time zone: UTC+4 (AZT)
  - Summer (DST): UTC+5 (AZT)

Əliləmbəyli (also, Əlilambəyli, Alilambeyli, and Alyam-Beyly) is a village and municipality in the Sabirabad Rayon of Azerbaijan. It has a population of 651.
