= Şix Salahlı =

- Municipality
- Location within Azerbaijan
- Coordinates: 39°58′38″N 48°48′06″E
- Country: Azerbaijan
- Rayon: Sabirabad

Population
  - Total: 1,482
- Time zone: UTC+4 (AZT)
  - Summer (DST): UTC+5 (AZT)

Şix Salahlı (also, Shikh-Salagly, Shikhsalakhly, and Shykhsalakhly) is a village and municipality in the Sabirabad Rayon of Azerbaijan. It has a population of 1,482.
