= Zalqaraağac =

- Municipality
- Location within Azerbaijan
- Coordinates: 39°55′N 48°48′E
- Country: Azerbaijan
- Rayon: Sabirabad

Population
  - Total: 889
- Time zone: UTC+4 (AZT)
  - Summer (DST): UTC+5 (AZT)

Zalqaraağac (also, Zalkaraagach) is a village and municipality in the Sabirabad Rayon of Azerbaijan. It has a population of 889.
