= Qardaşkənd =

- Municipality
- Location within Azerbaijan
- Coordinates: 39°52′N 48°47′E
- Country: Azerbaijan
- Rayon: Sabirabad

Population
  - Total: 310
- Time zone: UTC+4 (AZT)
  - Summer (DST): UTC+5 (AZT)

Qardaşkənd (also, Kardashkend) is a village and municipality in the Sabirabad Rayon of Azerbaijan. It has a population of 310.
