= Çöl Dəllək =

- Municipality
- Location within Azerbaijan
- Coordinates: 39°50′17″N 48°47′36″E
- Country: Azerbaijan
- Rayon: Sabirabad

Population
  - Total: 365
- Time zone: UTC+4 (AZT)
  - Summer (DST): UTC+5 (AZT)

Çöl Dəllək (also, Chël’dellyak and Chol’-Dallyak) is a village and municipality in the Sabirabad Rayon of Azerbaijan. It has a population of 365.
