= Yaxa Dəllək =

- Municipality
- Location within Azerbaijan
- Coordinates: 39°52′32″N 48°53′29″E
- Country: Azerbaijan
- Rayon: Sabirabad

Population
  - Total: 911
- Time zone: UTC+4 (AZT)
  - Summer (DST): UTC+5 (AZT)

Yaxa Dəllək (also, Yakha-Dallyak and Yakhadellyak) is a village and municipality in the Sabirabad Rayon of Azerbaijan. It has a population of 911.
