= Chemberekend Cemetery =

Former cemetery in Baku, Azerbaijan

- Azerbaijani: Çəmbərəkənd qəbiristanlığı
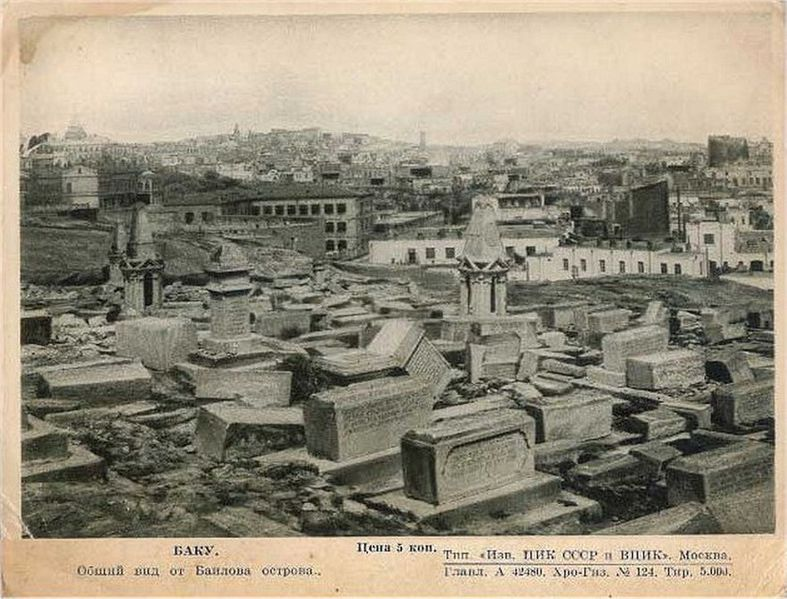
- Interactive map of Chemberekend Cemetery

Details
- Abandoned: demolished in the 1930s
- Location: Baku
- Country: Azerbaijan
- Coordinates: 40°21′36″N 49°49′56″E
- Size: 0,106 км²

Chemberekend Cemetery (Azerbaijani: Çəmbərəkənd qəbiristanlığı) was a multi-confessional cemetery in Baku used until July 1883. The cemetery was located in the southwestern part of the Baku fortress, to the east of the Chemberekend village, a suburb of Baku, on the northeastern slope of the hill known as Pirvanzara. On the city plan of Baku in 1899, drawn up by the city engineer Colonel Nikolai von der Nonne, the cemetery during this period consisted of three sections: the northern section for Muslim burials, the central section for Armenians and Gregorians, and the southern section for Orthodox burials. From the suburb of Chemberekend, the cemetery was separated by Nizhnyaya Chemberekend street. It was demolished under Soviet rule in the 1930s.

== Cemetery’s history ==
=== Early history ===
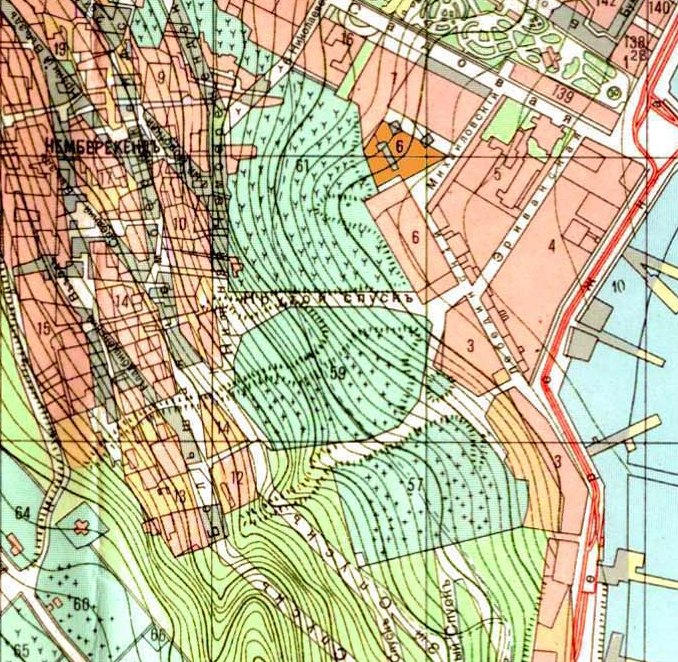
The Cemetery’s plan on the von der Nonne map (1899)

In the 1820s, when the city of Baku only began to resemble as a secular city, the cemetery was located on its outskirts, behind the fortress walls. Over time, as Baku began to grow and went beyond the fortress walls, the Chemberekend cemetery was engulfed by the new residential buildings of the city. According to the architect Lev Ilyin, vast cemeteries have been located since ancient times to the west of the old city fortress on the nearby hills of Chemberekend. They rose on terraces on the Uplands plateau and were located in its folds. The later cemeteries—Armenian and Russian—occupied the points dominating the city.

It was assumed that due to the presence of a cemetery with tombstones on this territory immediately adjacent to the fortress, was also, possibly because of defensive purposes, that this territory was not built up. However, already in the city plan of 1855, this cemetery was called "old", and on the area below the current Alley of Martyrs there was a new cemetery shown, which suggests that even then, it meant the transfer of the old cemetery and the release of this territory for building.

=== The question of transferring the cemetery ===
The August issues of Baku newspaper Kaspi in 1882 noted that the location of the cemetery in the immediate vicinity of the residential buildings was harmful for the population. The newspaper also noted that the cemeteries, particularly the Russian one, begins from the roofs of the outer city houses and to enter the cemetery from the embankment, it is enough to climb the front step of the first house, to jump directly from the last step to the graves, and a small step from the roof of those houses is enough to end up in the cemetery.

Many residents reported to the newspaper correspondents that on days of intense heat, there was a strong stench of decomposing corpses. The newspaper also reported that the cemetery did not have a special compartment for those who died in epidemics. The newspaper proposed to allocate a new place for the cemetery behind the ridge of the same mountain, on the slope of which the Chemberekend cemetery was located.

=== Cemetery closure and demolition ===
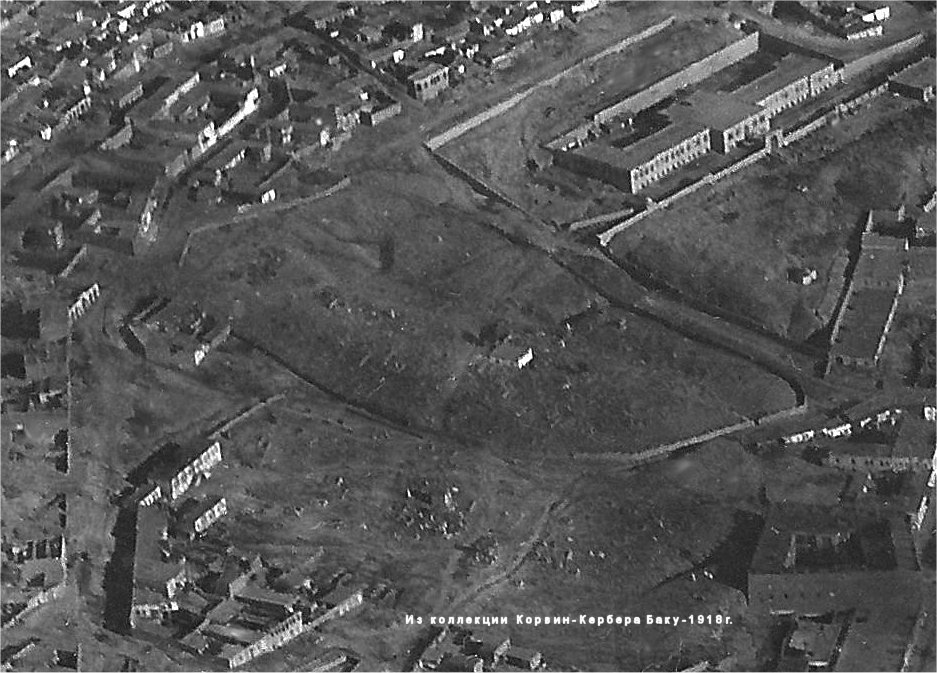
An aerial photo view of the cemetery in 1918. In the upper right corner of the image, it can be seen the building of the Saadet school on the territory of the Muslim part of the cemetery.

On 27 September 1882, at the second regular meeting of the Baku City Duma, the issue of transferring the Chemberekend cemetery to a new location was considered and eventually chosen.

In the June issue of the newspaper Kaspi in 1883, the city government announced that as a result of the decision of the Sanitary Committee and in accordance with the verdicts of the City Duma, all Muslim and Christian cemeteries in the city of Baku near the Chemberekend suburb would be closed permanently as of July 1st. New burials had to be carried out in newly selected places in the area of Pirvanzara above Chemberekend. The burial of the dead in old cemeteries was already strictly forbidden.

In the early 1910s, on the site of the Muslim part of the cemetery, it was decided to build the Saadet Muslim Spiritual School. The architect Zivar bay Ahmadbayov prepared a building proposal, and relatives and friends of the deceased transferred their remains to the Nagornoye cemetery. The now-empty graves were razed to the ground, and on 23 December 1912, the foundation of the school building was laid.

In the 1930s, both the Chemberekend and the new Nagornoye cemeteries were finally demolished, and parks were created over the former burial grounds. On the Chemberekend cemetery site, the Chemberekend garden was newly established. Subsequently, such buildings as the Baku Funicular, the Green Theater, the Gulustan Palace and some residential buildings were also built on this territory.

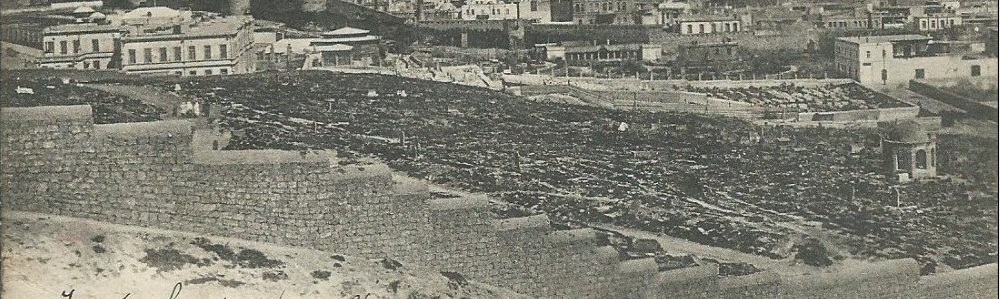
Muslim part of the cemetery

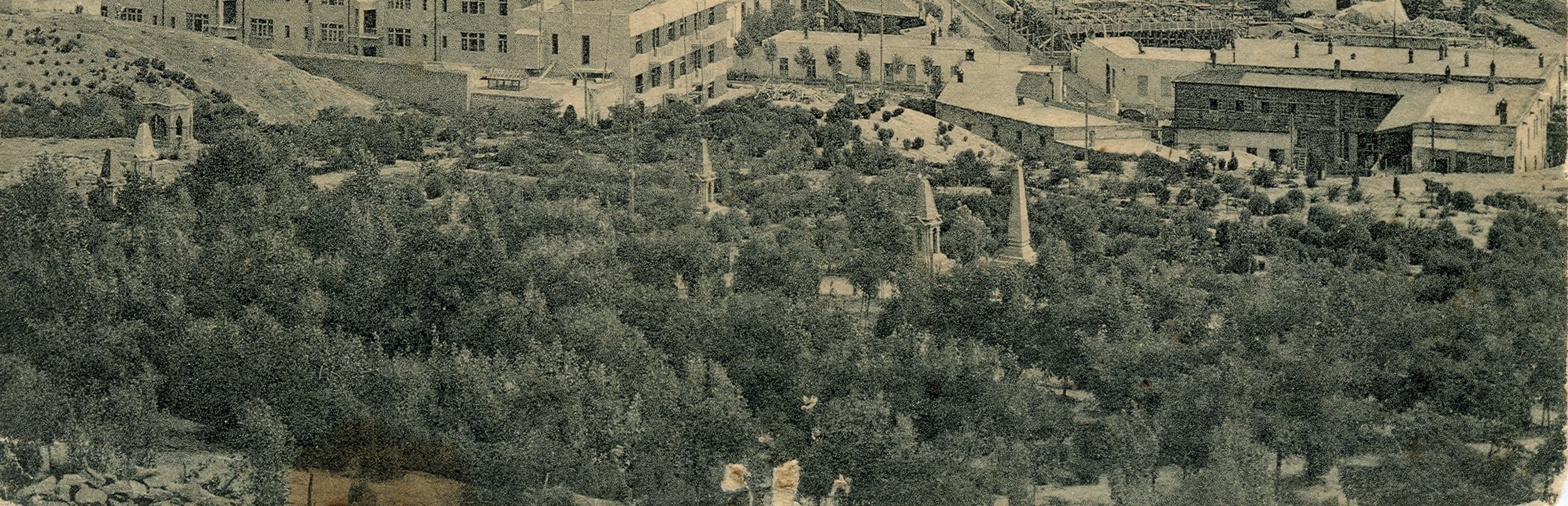
Gregorian part of the cemetery

== See also ==
- Alley of Honor
- Ancient Muslim cemetery (Baku)
- German prisoners of war cemetery (Baku)
