= Nuraly-Kend =

- Location within Azerbaijan
- Coordinates: 39°48′19″N 48°52′14″E
- Country: Azerbaijan
- Rayon: Sabirabad
- Time zone: UTC+4 (AZT)
  - Summer (DST): UTC+5 (AZT)

Nuraly-Kend is a village in the Sabirabad Rayon of Azerbaijan.
