= Agaragimli =

- Location within Azerbaijan
- Coordinates: 39°56′N 48°20′E
- Country: Azerbaijan
- Rayon: Saatly
- Time zone: UTC+4 (AZT)
  - Summer (DST): UTC+5 (AZT)

Agaragimli is a village in the Saatly Rayon of Azerbaijan.
