= Yuxarı Axtaçı =

Village in Sabirabad Rayon, Azerbaijan

Coordinates: 40°02′15″N 48°18′55″E

Yuxarı Axtaçı is a village and municipality in the Sabirabad Rayon of Azerbaijan. It has a population of 930.
