= Yastıqobu =

Village in Sabirabad Rayon, Azerbaijan

Coordinates: 39°59′N 48°35′E

Yastıqobu is a village and the least populous municipality in the Sabirabad Rayon of Azerbaijan. It has a population of 230.
