= Sarxanbəyli =

- Municipality
- Location within Azerbaijan
- Coordinates: 39°44′44″N 48°46′43″E
- Country: Azerbaijan
- Rayon: Sabirabad

Population
  - Total: 1,637
- Time zone: UTC+4 (AZT)
  - Summer (DST): UTC+5 (AZT)

Sarkhanbeyli (Azerbaijani: Sarxanbəyli) (also, Sarhanbeily, Sarkhan-Beyli, and Sarykhanbeyli) is a village and municipality in the Sabirabad Rayon of Azerbaijan. It has a population of 1,637.
