= Naharlı =

Naharlı is a village and municipality in the Saatly Rayon of Azerbaijan. It has a population of 579.
