= Qara Nuru =

- Municipality
- Location within Azerbaijan
- Coordinates: 39°55′06″N 48°30′41″E
- Country: Azerbaijan
- Rayon: Saatly

Population
  - Total: 5,737
- Time zone: UTC+4 (AZT)
  - Summer (DST): UTC+5 (AZT)

Qara Nuru (known as Krasnoselsk until 1992) is a village and the most populous municipality, except for the capital Saatlı, in the Saatly Rayon of Azerbaijan. It has a population of 5,737.
