= Dadaşbəyli =

- Municipality
- Location within Azerbaijan
- Coordinates: 39°57′N 48°52′E
- Country: Azerbaijan
- Rayon: Sabirabad

Population
  - Total: 677
- Time zone: UTC+4 (AZT)
  - Summer (DST): UTC+5 (AZT)

Dadaşbəyli (also, Dadashbeyli) is a village and municipality in the Sabirabad Rayon of Azerbaijan. It has a population of 677.
