= Khila Mirzali =

- Location within Azerbaijan
- Coordinates: 40°00′58″N 48°47′59″E
- Country: Azerbaijan
- Rayon: Sabirabad
- Time zone: UTC+4 (AZT)
  - Summer (DST): UTC+5 (AZT)

Khila Mirzali is a village in the Sabirabad Rayon of Azerbaijan.
