= Garajalar =

Coordinates: 39°52′53″N 48°18′7″E

Garajalar Qaracalar
- Interactive map of Garajalar
- Country: Azerbaijan

Area
  - Total: 260 km^{2} (100 sq mi)
- Time zone: UTC+4 (GMT+4)
  - Summer (DST): UTC+5 (GMT+5)

Garajalar (Azeri: Qaracalar) is a village in the district of Saatly, Azerbaijan.

== Geography ==
The village is located in the Saatly region of Azerbaijan Republic, at the east side of Aras River in the south-east part of the region, 200 km from Baku, capital of Azerbaijan.

As of 2017 the population of the village was 1200.

== History ==
The village has been located at the side of Aras river for about 1000 to 1200 years. One part of the historical statistics (after 1828) about the village are taken from Russian archives and books written before Soviet Union. Information regarding before Russian imperia is from local sources.

== Economy ==
Main occupation of the people in the village is agriculture: Cotton and Grain planting. Same time people dealing with cattle-breeding although.

== Famous people from the village ==
• Agaveli Ibrahimov – Dean of the faculty of Biology at Baku State University. It is 20 year Ibrahimov works head of the faculty. Same time he is professor and has a Ph.D. in biological sciences.

• Kerim Gasumov – He is a scientist and has a Ph.D. in biological sciences. Present time he works in the Institute of Botany Azerbaijan Academy of Sciences.

• Maharram Maharramov – Head of the Narimanov branch of the Azerbaijan republic State Social Protection Fund

• Hikmet Ibrahimov – Director of the Leasing Operations Department and Member of the executive board of the Unileasing leasing company.
