= Galagayin Mosque =

Mosque in Qalaqayın, Sabirabad, Azerbaijan

- Azerbaijani: Qalaqayın Məscidi; Persian: مسجد قلعه‌قایین
- Location of the mosque in Azerbaijan

Religion
- Affiliation: Shia Islam
- Ecclesiastical or organisational status: Mosque (1657–1928); Profane use (1928–1990); Mosque (since 1990)
- Status: Active

Location
- Location: Qalaqayın, Sabirabad District
- Country: Azerbaijan
- Coordinates: 39°59′19″N 48°27′37″E

Architecture
- Type: Mosque architecture
- Style: Safavid; Shirvan-Absheron
- Completed: 1657

Specifications
- Dome: Three
- Minaret: One
- Minaret height: 17 m (56 ft)

Website
- qafqazislam.com (in Azerbaijani)

The Galagayin Mosque (Azerbaijani: Qalaqayın Məscidi; Persian: مسجد قلعه‌قایین) is a Shia Islam mosque, located in Qalaqayın, in the Sabirabad District of Azerbaijan.

In the stone inscriptions, it was mentioned that it was repaired in 1831 by a person named Haji Zeynalabidin. It was last renovated in 1988.

The mosque is rectangular, its walls are decorated with verses of the Quran in Arabic. The mosques has a minaret and three domes. The minaret and domes are made of iron and the height of the minaret is 17 m (56 ft).

During the Soviet period, the mosque was used as a warehouse. In 1990, the building was restored as a mosque.

== See also ==
- Shia Islam in Azerbaijan
- List of mosques in Azerbaijan
