= Bagyrtugay =

- Location within Azerbaijan
- Coordinates: 39°48′N 48°56′E
- Country: Azerbaijan
- Rayon: Sabirabad
- Time zone: UTC+4 (AZT)
  - Summer (DST): UTC+5 (AZT)

Bagyrtugay (also, Bagir-Tugay) is a village in the Sabirabad Rayon of Azerbaijan.

Bagyrtugay is a populated place in Sabirabad Rayonu (Sabirabad), Azerbaijan (Asia) with the region font code of Eastern Europe.
