= Güdəcühür =

- Municipality
- Location within Azerbaijan
- Coordinates: 40°00′19″N 48°45′28″E
- Country: Azerbaijan
- Rayon: Sabirabad

Population
  - Total: 1,691
- Time zone: UTC+4 (AZT)
  - Summer (DST): UTC+5 (AZT)

Güdəcühür (also, Gyudadzhugur, Gyudadzhur, Gyudadzhyugy, and Gyudadzhyugyur) is a village and municipality in the Sabirabad Rayon of Azerbaijan. It has a population of 1,691.
