= Axtaçı Muğan =

Coordinates: 40°01′N 48°43′E

Axtaçı Muğan is a village and municipality in the Sabirabad Rayon of Azerbaijan. It has a population of 1,914.
