= Bala Haşimxanlı =

- Municipality
- Location within Azerbaijan
- Coordinates: 39°47′20″N 48°44′20″E
- Country: Azerbaijan
- Rayon: Sabirabad

Population
  - Total: 1,656
- Time zone: UTC+4 (AZT)
  - Summer (DST): UTC+5 (AZT)

Bala Haşimxanlı (also, Bala Haşımxanlı and Bala Gashimkhanly) is a village and municipality in the Sabirabad Rayon of Azerbaijan. It has a population of 1,656.
