= Əlicanlı =

- Municipality
- Location within Azerbaijan
- Coordinates: 40°02′16″N 48°26′01″E
- Country: Azerbaijan
- Rayon: Sabirabad

Population
  - Total: 1,001
- Time zone: UTC+4 (AZT)
  - Summer (DST): UTC+5 (AZT)

Əlicanlı (also, Alidzhamli, Alidzhanli, and Alidzhanly) is a village and municipality in the Sabirabad Rayon of Azerbaijan. It has a population of 1.
