= Ulacalı =

- Municipality
- Location within Azerbaijan
- Coordinates: 40°04′34″N 48°35′53″E
- Country: Azerbaijan
- Rayon: Bakı

Population
  - Total: 3,552
- Time zone: UTC+4 (AZT)
  - Summer (DST): UTC+5 (AZT)

Ulacalı (also, Uladzhaly, Uladzhrly, and Uludzhaly) is a village and municipality in the Sabirabad Rayon of Azerbaijan. It has a population of 3,552.

The area around Ulacalı is almost entirely covered by farmland. With a population density of about 80 people per square kilometer, the area around Ulacalı is relatively densely populated. The climate is cool and dry. The average temperature is 16 °C. The warmest month is July, at 28 °C, and the coldest is January, at 2 °C.] The average annual rainfall is 517 mm. The wettest month is November, with 64 mm of rain, and the driest is August, with 5 mm.
