= Qaratuğay =

- Municipality
- Location within Azerbaijan
- Coordinates: 39°59′17″N 48°48′55″E
- Country: Azerbaijan
- Rayon: Sabirabad

Population
  - Total: 1,698
- Time zone: UTC+4 (AZT)
  - Summer (DST): UTC+5 (AZT)

Qaratuğay (also, Karatogay, Kara-Tugai, and Karatugay) is a village and municipality in the Sabirabad Rayon of Azerbaijan. It has a population of 1,698.
