= Çığırğan =

- Municipality
- Location within Azerbaijan
- Coordinates: 39°46′N 48°55′E
- Country: Azerbaijan
- Rayon: Sabirabad

Population
  - Total: 786
- Time zone: UTC+4 (AZT)
  - Summer (DST): UTC+5 (AZT)

Çığırğan (also, Chygyrgan and Chagyrgan) is a village and municipality in the Sabirabad Rayon of Azerbaijan. It has a population of 786.
