= Kovlar =

- Municipality
- Location within Azerbaijan
- Coordinates: 40°06′55″N 48°33′26″E
- Country: Azerbaijan
- Rayon: Sabirabad

Population
  - Total: 1,666
- Time zone: UTC+4 (AZT)
  - Summer (DST): UTC+5 (AZT)

Kovlar (also, Beyuk Kovlar, Bol’shoy Kovlyar, Qovlar, and Kovlyar) is a village and municipality in the Sabirabad Rayon of Azerbaijan. It has a population of 1,666.
