= Kirovkənd =

Kirovkənd or Kirovkend may refer to:

- Həsənsu, Azerbaijan
- Ənvər Məmmədxanlı, Azerbaijan
- Kirovkend, Saatly, Azerbaijan
