= Sımada =

- Municipality
- Location within Azerbaijan
- Coordinates: 39°45′54″N 48°39′30″E
- Country: Azerbaijan
- Rayon: Saatly

Population
  - Total: 1,372
- Time zone: UTC+4 (AZT)
  - Summer (DST): UTC+5 (AZT)

Sımada is a village and municipality in the Saatly Rayon of Azerbaijan. It has a population of 1,372.
