= Bəylik, Saatly =

Bəylik
- Municipality
- Location within Azerbaijan
- Coordinates: 39°57′55″N 48°25′16″E
- Country: Azerbaijan
- Rayon: Saatly

Population
  - Total: 860
- Time zone: UTC+4 (AZT)
  - Summer (DST): UTC+5 (AZT)

Bəylik (also, Beilyar and Beylik) is a village and municipality in the Saatly Rayon of Azerbaijan. It has a population of 860.
