= Məzrəli, Saatly =

Məzrəli
- Municipality
- Location within Azerbaijan
- Coordinates: 39°54′51″N 48°14′32″E
- Country: Azerbaijan
- Rayon: Saatly

Population
  - Total: 1,027
- Time zone: UTC+4 (AZT)
  - Summer (DST): UTC+5 (AZT)

Məzrəli (known as Yuxarı Hacıqasımlı until 2000) is a village and municipality in the Saatly Rayon of Azerbaijan. It has a population of 972.
