= Ətcələr, Sabirabad =

Ətcələr
- Municipality
- Location within Azerbaijan
- Coordinates: 40°03′N 48°40′E
- Country: Azerbaijan
- Rayon: Sabirabad

Population
  - Total: 1,210
- Time zone: UTC+4 (AZT)
  - Summer (DST): UTC+5 (AZT)

Ətcələr (also, Etcheler and Etchelyar) is a village and municipality in the Sabirabad Rayon of Azerbaijan. It has a population of 1,210.
