= Yeni Novruzlu =

Village in Saatly Rayon, Azerbaijan

Coordinates: 40°01′N 48°27′E

Yeni Novruzlu is a village and municipality in the Saatly Rayon of Azerbaijan. It has a population of 881.
