= Dədə Qorqud =

- Location within Azerbaijan
- Coordinates: 39°52′09″N 48°23′18″E
- Country: Azerbaijan
- Rayon: Saatly

Population
  - Total: 2,137
- Time zone: UTC+4 (AZT)
  - Summer (DST): UTC+5 (AZT)

Dədə Qorqud (known as Bayramovka until 1999) is a village and municipality in the Saatly Rayon of Azerbaijan. It has a population of 2,137.
