= Ağaşirinoba =

Aghashirinoba
- Municipality
- Azerbaijani: Ağaşirinoba
- Location within Azerbaijan
- Coordinates: 41°31′N 48°41′E
- Country: Azerbaijan
- District: Khachmaz

Population
  - Total: 1,541
- Time zone: UTC+4 (AZT)
  - Summer (DST): UTC+5 (AZT)

Ağaşirinoba (also, Aghashirinoba) is a village and municipality in the Khachmaz District of Azerbaijan. It has a population of 1,541. The municipality consists of the villages of Aghashirinoba, Gyragly, and Manafoba.
