= Sarıcalar, Saatly =

Sarıcalar
- Municipality
- Location within Azerbaijan
- Coordinates: 39°56′22″N 48°29′43″E
- Country: Azerbaijan
- Rayon: Saatly

Population
  - Total: 2,635
- Time zone: UTC+4 (AZT)
  - Summer (DST): UTC+5 (AZT)

Sarıcalar (also, Saradzhalyar) is a village and municipality in the Saatly Rayon of Azerbaijan. It has a population of 2,635.
