= Erdtmanithecales =

Erdtmanithecales Temporal range: Berriasian–Cenomanian
- Reconstruction of the Araripestrobus resinosus pollen cone, m = microsporophylls, scale bar = 50 mm

Scientific classification
- Kingdom: Plantae
- Clade: Embryophytes
- Clade: Tracheophytes
- Clade: Spermatophytes
- Order: †Erdtmanithecales; E.M.Friis et K.M.Pedersen, 1996

Families and genera
- See text

Extinct order of seed-bearing plants

Erdtmanithecales is an extinct order of gymnosperm plants known from the Mesozoic era. Known remains include pollen organs and seeds associated with Eucommiidites pollen, which is considered diagnostic for the order. The order was first described in 1996. While Eucommiidites pollen first appears in the Early Jurassic, associated floral remains are not found until the Early Cretaceous. It is thought that the group are closely related to Gnetales as well as possibly Bennettitales.

== Systematics ==
- Order Erdtmanithecales Friis and Pedersen 1996
  - family Erdtrnanithecaeae Friis and Pedersen 1996
    - Erdtmanitheca Pedersen, Crane & Friis, 1989 (pollen organ)
      - Erdtmanitheca portucalensis Mendes et al., 2010 (Aptian-Albian), Lusitanian Basin, Portugal
      - Erdtmanitheca texensis Pedersen, Crane & Friis, 1989 Woodbine Formation, Texas, USA, Cenomanian
    - Erdtmanispermum Pedersen, Crane & Friis, 1989 (seeds)
      - Erdtmanispermum juncalense Mendes et al., 2007 Berriasian, Lusitanian Basin, Portugal
      - Erdtmanispermum balticum Pedersen, Crane & Friis, 1989 Jydegard formation, Denmark, Berriasian-Valanginian
    - Eucommiitheca Friis and Pedersen 1996 (pollen organ)
      - Eucommiitheca hirsuta Friis and Pedersen 1996 Barremian-Aptian, Lusitanian Basin, Portugal
    - Bayeritheca Kvaček and Pacltová, 2001 (pollen organ)
      - Bayeritheca hugesii Peruc-Korycany Formation, Bohemia, Czech Republic, Cenomanian
  - Incertae sedis
    - Araripestrobus Seyfullah, E.A.Roberts, A.R.Schmidt et L.Kunzmann, 2020 (pollen cones)
      - Araripestrobus resinosus Seyfullah, E.A.Roberts, A.R.Schmidt et L.Kunzmann, 2020, Crato Formation, Brazil, Aptian
