= Qaracalar =

- Municipality
- Location within Azerbaijan
- Coordinates: 39°52′49″N 48°18′06″E
- Country: Azerbaijan
- Rayon: Saatly

Population
  - Total: 976
- Time zone: UTC+4 (AZT)
  - Summer (DST): UTC+5 (AZT)

Qaracalar (also, Karalar, Karaliar and Karadzhalar) is a village and municipality in the Saatly Rayon of Azerbaijan. It has a population of 976.
