= Kamallı, Saatly =

Kamallı
- Municipality
- Location within Azerbaijan
- Coordinates: 39°55′21″N 48°16′38″E
- Country: Azerbaijan
- Rayon: Saatly

Population
  - Total: 1,051
- Time zone: UTC+4 (AZT)
  - Summer (DST): UTC+5 (AZT)

Kamallı (also, Kemally, Kayamally, and Kyamally) is a village and municipality in the Saatly Rayon of Azerbaijan. It has a population of 1,051.
