= Mustafabəyli =

- Municipality
- Location within Azerbaijan
- Coordinates: 39°57′33″N 48°24′55″E
- Country: Azerbaijan
- Rayon: Saatly

Population
  - Total: 2,095
- Time zone: UTC+4 (AZT)
  - Summer (DST): UTC+5 (AZT)

Mustafabəyli (also Mustafabeyli) is a village in the Saatly Rayon of Azerbaijan. It was formed in 1992 through the division of the village Leninkənd into two parts. The other part became the village of Qıraqlı. Mustafabəyli has a population of 2,095.
