= Əbil =

- village and municipality
- Location within Azerbaijan
- Coordinates: 39°57′N 48°33′E
- Country: Azerbaijan
- District: Saatly
- Time zone: UTC+4 (AZT)
  - Summer (DST): UTC+5 (AZT)

Əbil (formerly Ukrainskiye Otruba, 26 Bakı Komissarı) is a village and municipality in the Saatly Rayon of Azerbaijan. It has a population of 887. Ukrainskiye Otruba was founded in the nineteenth century by Russian-speaking immigrants from what is now Ukraine. By the 1950s, most Russian speakers had left the village and it was resettled by ethnic Azeris from neighbouring villages. As of 2016, only one Russian-speaker, a 90-year-old man, still lived in Əbil.
