= Azadkənd, Sabirabad =

Azadkənd
- Municipality
- Location within Azerbaijan
- Coordinates: 39°48′42″N 48°52′50″E
- Country: Azerbaijan
- Rayon: Sabirabad

Population
  - Total: 1,739
- Time zone: UTC+4 (AZT)
  - Summer (DST): UTC+5 (AZT)

Azadkənd (also, Azadakend and Azadkend) is a village and municipality in the Sabirabad Rayon of Azerbaijan. It has a population of 1,739.
