= Hacıqasımlı =

Coordinates: 39°56′N 48°18′E

Hacıqasımlı (formerly Aşağı Hacıqasımlı) is a village and municipality in the Saatly Rayon of Azerbaijan. It has a population of 772.
