= Varxan =

- Municipality
- Location within Azerbaijan
- Coordinates: 39°51′52″N 48°14′42″E
- Country: Azerbaijan
- Rayon: Saatly

Population
  - Total: 2,023
- Time zone: UTC+4 (AZT)
  - Summer (DST): UTC+5 (AZT)

Varxan (also, Varkhan) is a village and municipality in the Saatly Rayon of Azerbaijan. It has a population of 2,023.
