= Ağqıraq =

- Location within Azerbaijan
- Coordinates: 40°39′52″N 47°04′00″E
- Country: Azerbaijan
- Rayon: Yevlakh
- Municipality: Balçılı
- Time zone: UTC+4 (AZT)
  - Summer (DST): UTC+5 (AZT)

Ağqıraq (also, Ağqıraqlı) is a village in the Yevlakh Rayon of Azerbaijan. The village forms part of the municipality of Balçılı.
