= Qazanbatan =

- Municipality
- Location within Azerbaijan
- Coordinates: 39°55′46″N 48°27′09″E
- Country: Azerbaijan
- Rayon: Saatly

Population
  - Total: 1,011
- Time zone: UTC+4 (AZT)
  - Summer (DST): UTC+5 (AZT)

Qazanbatan (known as Otradnoye until 1992) is a village and municipality in the Saatly Rayon of Azerbaijan. It has a population of 1,011.
