= Nərimanov =

- Municipality
- Location within Azerbaijan
- Coordinates: 39°57′40″N 48°22′53″E
- Country: Azerbaijan
- Rayon: Saatly

Population
  - Total: 1,072
- Time zone: UTC+4 (AZT)
  - Summer (DST): UTC+5 (AZT)

Nərimanov (formerly Abbasbeyli) is a village and municipality in the Saatly Rayon of Azerbaijan.It has a population of 1,072.
