= Moranlı, Sabirabad =

Moranlı
- Municipality
- Location within Azerbaijan
- Coordinates: 39°47′56″N 48°48′45″E
- Country: Azerbaijan
- Rayon: Sabirabad

Population
  - Total: 3,780
- Time zone: UTC+4 (AZT)
  - Summer (DST): UTC+5 (AZT)

Moranlı (also, Moranly and Muranly) is a village and municipality in the Sabirabad Rayon of Azerbaijan. It has a population of 3,780.
