= Günəşli, Saatly =

Günəşli is a village and municipality in the Saatly Rayón of Azerbaijan.

== Description ==
It has a population of 1,276.
