= Mollavazlı =

- Municipality
- Location within Azerbaijan
- Coordinates: 39°55′21″N 48°20′26″E
- Country: Azerbaijan
- Rayon: Saatly
- Time zone: UTC+4 (AZT)
  - Summer (DST): UTC+5 (AZT)

Mollavazlı (also, Mollavaizly) is a village and municipality in the Saatly Rayon of Azerbaijan.
