= Əlisoltanlı =

- Municipality
- Location within Azerbaijan
- Coordinates: 39°54′04″N 48°19′17″E
- Country: Azerbaijan
- Rayon: Saatly

Population
  - Total: 1,501
- Time zone: UTC+4 (AZT)
  - Summer (DST): UTC+5 (AZT)

Əlisoltanlı (also, Alisoltanly) is a village and municipality in the Saatly Rayon of Azerbaijan. It has a population of 1,501.
