= Genişkənd =

Village in Azerbaijan

Coordinates: 39°53′N 48°28′E

Genişkənd is a village and municipality in the Saatly Rayon of Azerbaijan. It has a population of 557.
