= Nabatkənd =

- Municipality
- Location within Azerbaijan
- Coordinates: 39°52′54″N 48°36′37″E
- Country: Azerbaijan
- Rayon: Saatly

Population
  - Total: 2,347
- Time zone: UTC+4 (AZT)
  - Summer (DST): UTC+5 (AZT)

Nabatkənd, formerly, Xanlarkənd or Khanlarkend, is a village and municipality in the Saatly Rayon of Azerbaijan. It has a population of 2,347.
