= Gomuşçu, Sabirabad =

Gomuşçu
- Location within Azerbaijan
- Coordinates: 40°03′04″N 48°23′37″E
- Country: Azerbaijan
- Rayon: Sabirabad
- Time zone: UTC+4 (AZT)
  - Summer (DST): UTC+5 (AZT)

Gomuşçu (also, Gomushchu and Tomushi) is a village in the Sabirabad Rayon of Azerbaijan.
