= Nəsimikənd =

- Municipality
- Location within Azerbaijan
- Coordinates: 39°50′20″N 48°36′46″E
- Country: Azerbaijan
- Rayon: Saatly

Population
  - Total: 3,286
- Time zone: UTC+4 (AZT)
  - Summer (DST): UTC+5 (AZT)

Nəsimikənd is a village and municipality in the Saatly Rayon of Azerbaijan. It has a population of 3,286.
