= Novruzlu, Saatly =

Novruzlu
- Municipality
- Location within Azerbaijan
- Coordinates: 39°59′24″N 48°23′53″E
- Country: Azerbaijan
- Rayon: Saatly

Population
  - Total: 582
- Time zone: UTC+4 (AZT)
  - Summer (DST): UTC+5 (AZT)

Novruzlu (also, Nuruzly) is a village and municipality in the Saatly Rayon of Azerbaijan. It has a population of 582.
