= Azad Asgarov =

Azerbaijani wrestler

- Born: August 20, 1971 (age 55); Sabirabad, Azerbaijan
- Other names: The Beast
- Nationality: Azerbaijani
- Height: 5 ft 7.2 in (1.71 m)
- Weight: 176 lb (80 kg; 12.6 st)
- Division: Welterweight
- Reach: 67.3 in (171 cm)
- Style: Greco-Roman wrestling
- Fighting out of: Baku, Azerbaijan
- Team: Aliyev Professional Team

Mixed martial arts record
- Total: 50
- Wins: 45
- By knockout: 42
- By submission: 0
- Losses: 3
- Draws: 2
- No contests: 0

Azad Asgarov (Azerbaijani: Azad Əsgərov), (born August 20, 1971) is an Azerbaijani mixed martial artist and pankration world champion.

== Biography ==
Azad was born in a small village, near the area of Sabirabad, Azerbaijan. In 1987, Asgarov became champion of the USSR on the Greco-Roman wrestling.

=== Martial arts career ===
Azad had 50 fights on the professional ring, in which he won forty five fights, two draws and lost three fights due to his injuries. His rivals got to the last round of the fight only three times, the rest gave up in the first minutes of the fight.

== Personal life ==
Azad has also served in the Azerbaijani Army and has nine brothers.
