= Seyidlər, Saatly =

Seyidlər
- Village
- Location within Azerbaijan
- Coordinates: 39°53′52″N 48°18′01″E
- Country: Azerbaijan
- Rayon: Saatly
- Time zone: UTC+4 (AZT)
  - Summer (DST): UTC+5 (AZT)

Seyidlər (until April 1, 2008, in Seyidoba) is a village and municipality in the Saatly Rayon of Azerbaijan. It has a population of 1,077.
