= Ətcələr, Jalilabad =

Ətcələr
- Municipality
- Location within Azerbaijan
- Coordinates: 39°18′N 48°21′E
- Country: Azerbaijan
- Rayon: Jalilabad

Population
  - Total: 274
- Time zone: UTC+4 (AZT)
  - Summer (DST): UTC+5 (AZT)

Ətcələr (also, Etchelyar and Echeler) is a village and municipality in the Jalilabad Rayon of Azerbaijan. It has a population of 274.
