= Moranlı, Jalilabad =

Moranlı
- Municipality
- Location within Azerbaijan
- Coordinates: 39°16′46″N 48°16′34″E
- Country: Azerbaijan
- Rayon: Jalilabad

Population
  - Total: 911
- Time zone: UTC+4 (AZT)
  - Summer (DST): UTC+5 (AZT)

Moranlı (also, Moranly) is a village and municipality in the Jalilabad Rayon of Azerbaijan. It has a population of 911.
