= Qıraqlı, Saatly =

Qıraqlı
- Municipality
- Location within Azerbaijan
- Coordinates: 39°57′30″N 48°23′48″E
- Country: Azerbaijan
- Rayon: Saatly

Population
  - Total: 3,454
- Time zone: UTC+4 (AZT)
  - Summer (DST): UTC+5 (AZT)

Qıraqlı (also, Kragly and Kyragly) is a village and municipality in the Saatly Rayon of Azerbaijan. It was formed in 1992 through the division of the village Leninkənd into two parts. The other part became the village of Mustafabəyli. Qıraqlı has a population of 3,454.

== Notable natives ==
- Elshan Huseynov — National Hero of Azerbaijan.
