= Şirinbəyli =

- Municipality
- Location within Azerbaijan
- Coordinates: 39°52′00″N 48°30′13″E
- Country: Azerbaijan
- Rayon: Saatly

Population
  - Total: 4,056
- Time zone: UTC+4 (AZT)
  - Summer (DST): UTC+5 (AZT)

Şirinbəyli (formerly Tverskoye, Oktyabrabad) is a village and municipality in the Saatly Rayon of Azerbaijan. It has a population of 4,056.
