= Gomuşçu, Saatly =

Gomuşçu
- Municipality
- Location within Azerbaijan
- Coordinates: 39°52′N 48°17′E
- Country: Azerbaijan
- Rayon: Saatly

Population
  - Total: 837
- Time zone: UTC+4 (AZT)
  - Summer (DST): UTC+5 (AZT)

Gomuşçu (also, Gomushchu, Gemyushchi, and Gyumushchi) is a village and municipality in the Saatly Rayon of Azerbaijan. It has a population of 837.
