= Seversky (inhabited locality) =

Seversky (Russian: Северский; masculine), Severskaya (Северская; feminine), or Severskoye (Северское; neuter) is the name of several inhabited localities in Russia.

== Modern rural localities ==
- Seversky, Krasnodar Krai, a khutor in Penisiev Rural Okrug of Ust-Labinsky District of Krasnodar Krai
- Severskoye, Russia, a selo in Raduzhnoye Rural Settlement of Kolomensky District of Moscow Oblast
- Severskaya, a stanitsa in Seversky Rural Okrug of Seversky District of Krasnodar Krai

== Abolished localities ==
- Seversky, Sverdlovsk Oblast, a former urban-type settlement in Sverdlovsk Oblast; since 1942—a part of the town of Polevskoy

== See also ==
- Seversk, a closed city in Tomsk Oblast
