= Balçılı, Yevlakh =

Balçılı
- Municipality
- Location within Azerbaijan
- Coordinates: 40°40′55″N 47°02′42″E
- Country: Azerbaijan
- Rayon: Yevlakh

Population
  - Total: 1,104
- Time zone: UTC+4 (AZT)
  - Summer (DST): UTC+5 (AZT)

Balçılı (also, Balchyly) is a village and municipality in the Yevlakh Rayon of Azerbaijan. It has a population of 1,104. The municipality consists of the villages of Balçılı and Ağqıraq.
