= Çolpı =

Coordinates: 39°53′N 48°38′E

Çolpı is a village and municipality in the Saatly Rayon of Azerbaijan. The village was raised to municipality status in 2004.
