= Azadkənd, Saatly =

Azadkənd
- Municipality
- Location within Azerbaijan
- Coordinates: 39°47′35″N 48°33′25″E
- Country: Azerbaijan
- Rayon: Saatly

Population
  - Total: 1,743
- Time zone: UTC+4 (AZT)
  - Summer (DST): UTC+5 (AZT)

Azadkənd (also, Azadkend) is a village and municipality in the Saatly Rayon of Azerbaijan.

== Population ==
It has a population of 1,743.
