= Kamallı, Lachin =

Kamallı
- Location within Azerbaijan Location within East Zangezur Economic Region
- Coordinates: 39°43′13″N 46°18′29″E
- Country: Azerbaijan
- Rayon: Lachin
- Time zone: UTC+4 (AZT)
  - Summer (DST): UTC+5 (AZT)

Kamallı (also, Kyamally and Kyumaty) is a village in the Lachin Rayon of Azerbaijan.
