= Mircəlal =

- Municipality
- Location within Azerbaijan
- Coordinates: 39°50′36″N 48°38′42″E
- Country: Azerbaijan
- Rayon: Saatly

Population
  - Total: 4,123
- Time zone: UTC+4 (AZT)
  - Summer (DST): UTC+5 (AZT)

Mircəlal (known as Kirovkənd or Kirovka until 1991) is a village and municipality in the Saatly Rayon of Azerbaijan. It has a population of 4,123.
