= Saatlı, Barda =

Saatlı
- Municipality
- Location within Azerbaijan Location within Karabakh Economic Region
- Coordinates: 40°26′N 47°06′E
- Country: Azerbaijan
- Rayon: Barda

Population
  - Total: 622
- Time zone: UTC+4 (AZT)
  - Summer (DST): UTC+5 (AZT)

Saatlı (also, Saatly) is a village and municipality in the Barda Rayon of Azerbaijan. It has a population of 622.

== Notable natives ==
- Mirza Guliyev — National Hero of Azerbaijan.
