= Əhmədbəyli, Saatly =

Ahmedbeyli
- Location within Azerbaijan
- Coordinates: 39°53′26″N 48°23′09″E
- Country: Azerbaijan
- Rayon: Saatly

Population
  - Total: 1,347
- Time zone: UTC+4 (AZT)
  - Summer (DST): UTC+5 (AZT)

Ahmedbeyli (known as Telmankənd until 1999) is a village and municipality in the Saatly Rayon of Azerbaijan.

== Population ==
It has a population of 1,347.
