= Cəfərxan =

- Municipality
- Location within Azerbaijan
- Coordinates: 39°56′35″N 48°29′30″E
- Country: Azerbaijan
- Rayon: Saatly

Population
  - Total: 375
- Time zone: UTC+4 (AZT)
  - Summer (DST): UTC+5 (AZT)

Cəfərxan (also, Dzhafarkhan) is a village in the Saatly Rayon of Azerbaijan.

== Population ==
It has a population of 375.

It is the least populous municipality in the region.
