= Ətcələr, Masally =

Ətcələr
- Municipality
- Location within Azerbaijan
- Coordinates: 39°03′26″N 48°42′47″E
- Country: Azerbaijan
- Rayon: Masally

Population
  - Total: 840
- Time zone: UTC+4 (AZT)
  - Summer (DST): UTC+5 (AZT)

Ətcələr (also, Etchelyar and Atzhalyar) is a village and municipality in the Masally Rayon of Azerbaijan. It has a population of 840.
