= Tverskoy, Russia =

Tverskoy (Russian: Тверской; masculine), Tverskaya (Тверская; feminine), or Tverskoye (Тверское; neuter) is the name of several rural localities in Russia:

- Tverskoy (rural locality), a khutor in Novopashkovsky Rural Okrug of Krylovsky District in Krasnodar Krai; 46°25′N 40°16′E
- Tverskoye, Dmitrovskoye Rural Settlement, Selizharovsky District, Tver Oblast, a village in Dmitrovskoye Rural Settlement of Selizharovsky District in Tver Oblast
- Tverskoye, Selishchenskoye Rural Settlement, Selizharovsky District, Tver Oblast, a village in Selishchenskoye Rural Settlement of Selizharovsky District in Tver Oblast
- Tverskaya (rural locality), a stanitsa in Tverskoy Rural Okrug of Apsheronsky District in Krasnodar Krai; 44°36′N 39°37′E
