= Qıraqlı, Khachmaz =

Gyragly
- Azerbaijani: Qıraqlı
- Location within Azerbaijan
- Coordinates: 41°30′N 48°39′E
- Country: Azerbaijan
- District: Khachmaz
- Municipality: Ağaşirinoba
- Time zone: UTC+4 (AZT)
  - Summer (DST): UTC+5 (AZT)

Qıraqlı (also, Gyragly) is a village in the Khachmaz District of Azerbaijan. The village forms part of the municipality of Ağaşirinoba.
