= German prisoners of war cemetery (Baku) =

Cemetery in Baku, Azerbaijan

- Azerbaijani: Alman əsirləri qəbiristanlığı
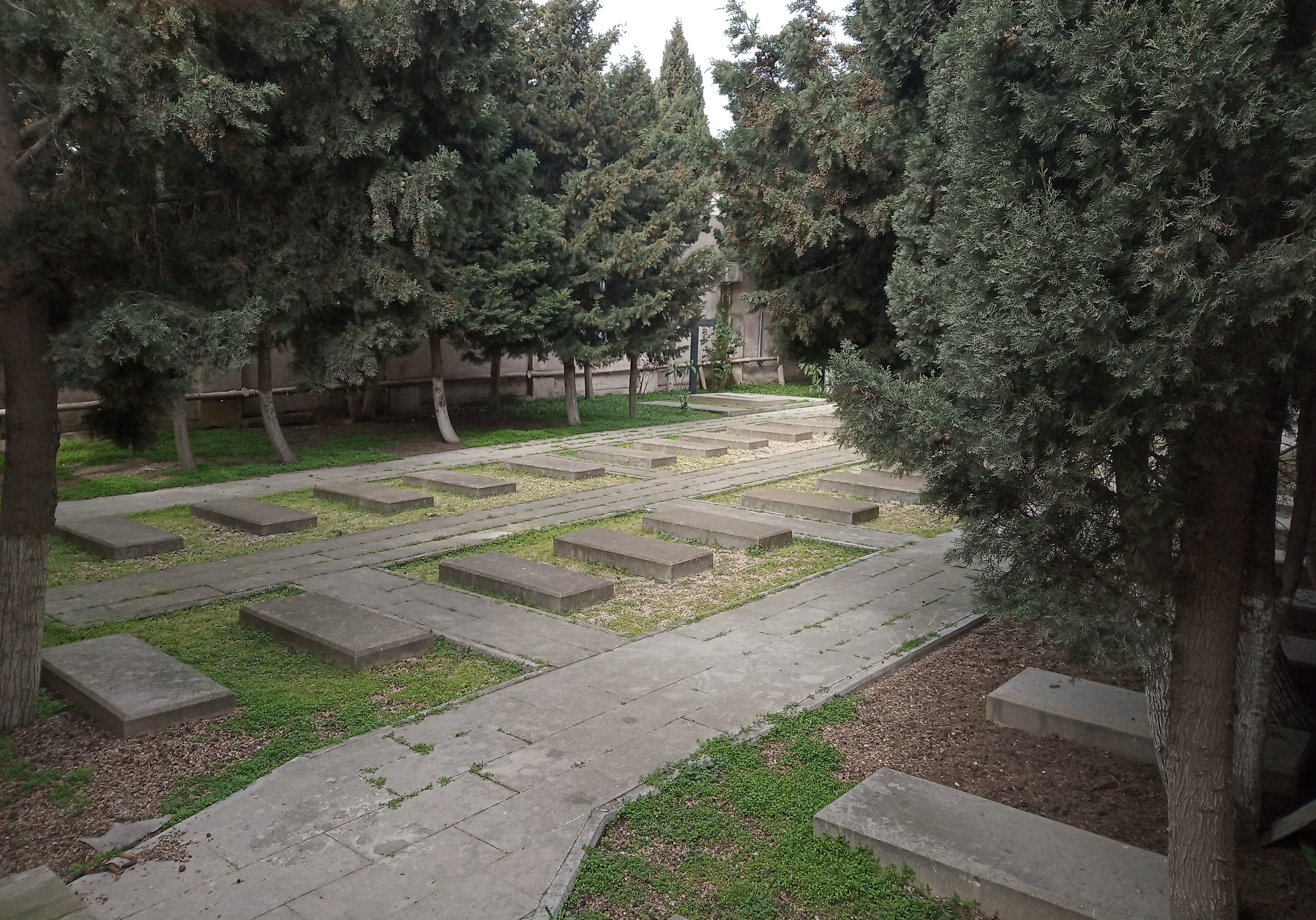
- Interactive map of German prisoners of war cemetery

Details
- Established: 1946
- Location: Baku
- Country: Azerbaijan
- Coordinates: 40°22′30″N 49°48′7″E
- Size: 0,00054 km²
- No. of graves: 90

The German prisoners of war cemetery (Azerbaijani: Alman əsirləri qəbiristanlığı), also known as the "German soldiers’ cemetery" (Azerbaijani: Alman əsgər məzarlığı) is a cemetery of the German prisoners of war located in the Yasamal district of Baku. There are 90 graves in the cemetery. Also on the territory of the cemetery, there is a monument in the form of a black cross.

== History ==
According to Tair Behbudov, a historian who studies the fate of German prisoners of war who arrived in Azerbaijan, about 42 thousand German prisoners of war arrived in Baku. As noted by another historian, Javid Bagirzadeh, the dispatch of the German prisoners of war to Azerbaijan consisted of two stages: the first group of German prisoners of war arrived in the republic in 1944, the second in 1945. The second group of prisoners of war arrived in the early 1945 from the central regions of Russia. Wounded prisoners of war were sent to Baku, some of whom later did not survived due to their injures. Many of the prisoners of war were later placed in other regions of the republic.

In Baku, the prisoners of war participated in the construction of buildings such as the Government House, the residential building of the Buzovnyneft trust, the actors residential house on Bakikhanov Street, the Bolshoy Dvor residential area complex on Stroiteley Avenue, etc. In particular, in the construction of the Government House, according to Behbudov, about 150 prisoners of war were involved, performing the roles of civil engineers, carpenters, stone cutters, facade craftsmen, etc. According to the archive data, that Behbudov relies on, the prisoners walked from the prison, which was located in the Black City, towards the construction site, and returned in the evening.

Some of the prisoners of war who died in Baku were buried in the Yasamal region. Today, there are 90 graves on the territory of this cemetery.

On 22 December 1995, the foreign ministers of Azerbaijan, Hasan Hasanov, and of Germany, Klaus Kinkel, visited the cemetery laying a wreath at the memorial cross.

== See also ==
- Glencree German war cemetery
- Orglandes German war cemetery
- German War Graves Commission
- German prisoners of war in Azerbaijan
- Cannock Chase German Military Cemetery
