= Ancient Muslim cemetery (Baku) =

Medieval cemetery in Baku, Azerbaijan

- Azerbaijani: Qədim müsəlman qəbiristanlığı
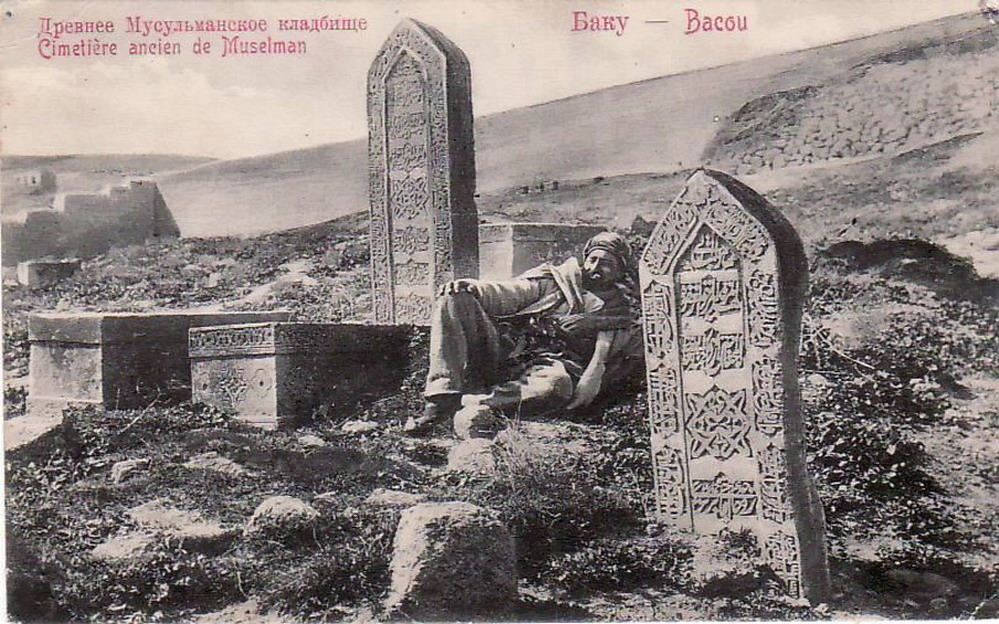

Details
- Established: Early Middle Ages
- Location: Baku
- Country: Azerbaijan
- Type: Muslim

The ancient Muslim cemetery (Azerbaijani: Qədim müsəlman qəbiristanlığı) is a medieval cemetery located until the second half of the 19th century in the northwest of the Baku fortress. During the construction work on the territory of the cemetery, pre-Muslim burials and a cemetery of 12-14 and earlier centuries were uncovered.

On 9 November 1883, the issue of allotting a Muslim cemetery in Baku for the construction of an Orthodox cathedral was brought up for discussion in the Baku City Duma. This decision was protested by Muslims, in connection with which the Duma decided to enclose the Muslim cemetery with a fence and to allocate a more convenient place for the construction of the cathedral. Nevertheless, the construction of the cathedral began on the site of an old Muslim cemetery. Consequently, in 1898, when digging the pit for the foundation of the future cathedral, were discovered ancient burials in the form of stone boxes located in several rows, one above the other, as well as a grave in the form of a large tendir.

On 8 October 1888, in Baku, in the presence of the Emperor Alexander III and the Tsarevich Nicholas, took place a solemn ceremony of laying the foundation stone of the Baku Cathedral, later named the Alexander Nevsky Cathedral. The prototype of the cathedral served the church in New Athos whose author was the academician Robert Marfeld, who became the architect of the Baku temple. The temple itself was also demolished by the order of the Soviet authorities in 1936. Currently, the Bulbul music school is located on this site.

== See also ==
- Alley of Honor
- Imarat cemetery
- Yeddi Gumbaz Mausoleum

== Literature ==
- Sara Ashurbeyli (2009). Bakı şəhərinin tarixi / The history of Baku (PDF). Baku: Apostrof.
