= Saatlı (city) =

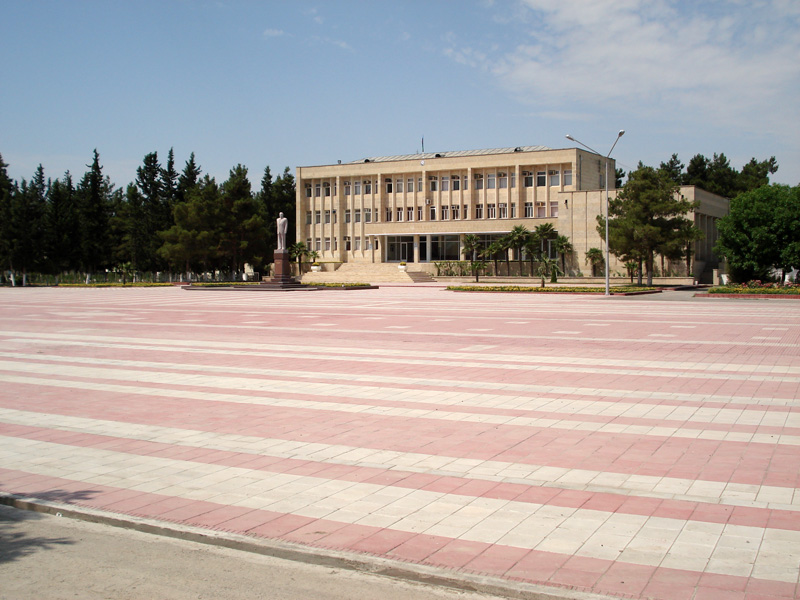
- Saatly City Hall

- Location within Azerbaijan
- Coordinates: 39°55′52″N 48°22′11″E
- Country: Azerbaijan
- District: Saatly
- Established: 1971
- Elevation: −9 m (−30 ft)

Population (2021)
  - Total: 20,300
- Time zone: UTC+4 (AZT)
- Area code: +994 2128
- Website: saatli-ih.gov.az

Saatlı (Saatly) is a city and the capital of the Saatly District of Azerbaijan.
