= Bəylər =

Coordinates: 39°55′N 48°20′E

Beyler (Azerbaijani: Bəylər) is a village and municipality in the Saatly District of Azerbaijan. It has a population of 1,495.
