= Balçılı, Goygol =

Balçılı
- Municipality
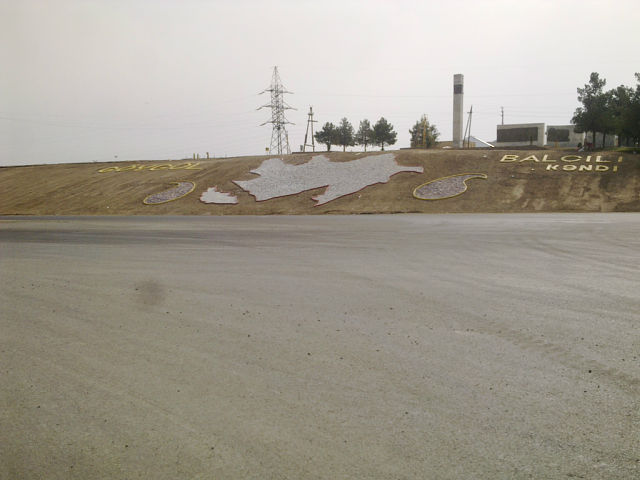

- Location within Azerbaijan
- Coordinates: 40°41′09″N 46°16′19″E
- Country: Azerbaijan
- Rayon: Goygol

Population
  - Total: 1,945
- Time zone: UTC+4 (AZT)

Balçılı (also, Bolçalı) is a village and municipality in the Goygol Rayon of Azerbaijan. It has a population of 1,945.
