= Saatly District =

District in central Azerbaijan

Coordinates: 39°55′51″N 48°22′10″E

- District
- Map of Azerbaijan showing Saatly District
- Country: Azerbaijan
- Region: Mil-Mughan
- Established: 25 May 1943
- Capital: Saatly
- Settlements: 44

Government
  - Governor: Elmir Baghirov

Area
  - Total: 1,180 km^{2} (460 sq mi)

Population (2020)
  - Total: 109,100
  - Density: 92.5/km^{2} (239/sq mi)
- Time zone: UTC+4 (AZT)
- Postal code: 4900
- Website: saatli-ih.gov.az

Saatly District (Azerbaijani: Saatlı rayonu) is one of the 66 districts of Azerbaijan. It is located in the centre of the country, belonging to the Central Aran Economic Region. The district borders the districts of Imishli, Sabirabad, and Bilasuvar. Its capital and largest city is Saatly. As of 2020, the district had a population of 109,100.

== History ==
There are several findings relating to ancient settlements in the Saatly District. Archaeological monuments, as well as pottery materials of the 2nd and 3rd millennials B.C, were excavated in villages of Azadkend, Fatalikend, Jafarkhan, Varkhan and Alisoltanly.

The Saatly region was formed on 25 May 1943. During World War II, 1600 residents of Saatly were sent to the front lines and 533 of them died in the war. In 1949, part of the Azerbaijanis expelled from Armenian SSR, Meskhetian Turks from Central Asia in 1958–59, and Azerbaijanis who became displaced due to First Nagorno-Karabakh war settled in the Saatly District.

Saatly has 19 school buildings, a central hospital for 390 people, a cultural centre, 11 medical points in villages, a music school, kindergarten for 450 children, two five-storey buildings with 35 apartments, two-storey mall, other administrative buildings, cotton-cleaning and milk plant, bread making plant as well as other industrial, transportation and service institutions were created in the region during the 1970s-80s.

== Geography ==
The region is situated in low-land and 28 meters lower above sea level. The region has dry summer with a semi-arid and dry climate. The average temperature is 1.4 °C in January and 26,2 °C in summer. The annual precipitation is 300 mm.

Saatly is mainly an agricultural region. Cotton planting, farming and vegetable production are the main agriculture in the region.

== Population ==
According to the State Statistics Committee, as of 2018, the population of the region recorded 106.5 thousand persons, which increased by 23 thousand persons (27 percent) from 83.5 thousand persons in 2000. Of the total population, 53.9 thousand are men and 52.6 thousand are women. The region has a significant ethnic Turkish minority, which makes up about 17% of the total population.

The population of district by the year (at the beginning of the year, thsd. persons)
Population	2000	2001	2002	2003	2004	2005	2006	2007	2008	2009	2010	2011	2012	2013	2014	2015	2016	2017	2018	2019	2020	2021
Saatly region	83,5	84,5	85,1	85,7	86,4	87,5	88,6	89,8	91,0	92,2	93,6	95,1	97,0	98,7	100,2	101,8	103,4	105,1	106,5	107,8	109,1	110,0
urban population	16,6	16,7	16,8	16,9	16,9	17,1	17,2	17,2	17,3	17,5	17,6	17,8	17,9	18,0	18,8	18,9	19,2	19,4	19,7	19,9	20,1	20,3
rural population	66,9	67,8	68,3	68,8	69,5	70,4	71,4	72,6	73,7	74,7	76,0	77,3	79,1	80,7	81,4	82,9	84,2	85,7	86,8	87,9	89,0	89,7

== Subdivisions ==
The Saatly District contains one city and 35 village municipalities or kǝnd iǝd (for inzibati ərazi dairəsi - administrative territory circle), the Azerbaijani term for a local government administrative unit.

- Saatlı city municipality (Saatlı şəhər iəd)

Saatlı (city)

- Azadkənd village municipality (Azadkənd kənd iəd)

Azadkənd (village)

- Bəylər village municipality (Bəylər kənd iəd)

Bəylər (village)

- Bəylik village municipality (Bəylik kənd iəd)

Bəylik (village)
- Yeni Novruzlu

- Çolpı village municipality (Çolpı kənd iəd)

Çolpı (village)

- Dədə Qorqud village municipality (Dədə Qorqud kənd iəd)

Dədə Qorqud (village)
- Heydərabad

- Dəlilər village municipality (Dəlilər kənd iəd)

Dəlilər (village)

- Əbil village municipality (Əbil kənd iəd)

Əbil (village)
- Cəfərxan

- Əhmədbəyli village municipality (Əhmədbəyli kənd iəd)

Əhmədbəyli (village)

- Əliabad village municipality (Əliabad kənd iəd)

Əliabad (village)

- Əlisoltanlı village municipality (Əlisoltanlı kənd iəd)

Əlisoltanlı (village)
- Potubəyli

- Fətəlikənd village municipality (Fətəlikənd kənd iəd)

Fətəlikənd (village)

- Genişkənd village municipality (Genişkənd kənd iəd)

Genişkənd (village)

- Gomuşçu village municipality (Gomuşçu kənd iəd)

Gomuşçu (village)

- Günəşli village municipality (Günəşli kənd iəd)

Günəşli (village)

- Hacıqasımlı village municipality (Hacıqasımlı kənd iəd)

Hacıqasımlı (village)
- Kamallı

- Qaracalar village municipality (Qaracalar kənd iəd)

Qaracalar (village)

- Qara Nuru village municipality (Qara Nuru kənd iəd)

Qara Nuru (village)

- Qazanbatan village municipality (Qazanbatan kənd iəd)

Qazanbatan (village)

- Qıraqlı village municipality (Qıraqlı kənd iəd)

Qıraqlı (village)

- Məmmədabad village municipality (Məmmədabad kənd iəd)

Məmmədabad (village)

- Məzrəli village municipality (Məzrəli kənd iəd)

Məzrəli (village)
- Naharlı

- Mircəlal village municipality (Mircəlal kənd iəd)

Mircəlal (village)

- Mollavazlı village municipality (Mollavazlı kənd iəd)

Mollavazlı (village)

- Mustafabəyli village municipality (Mustafabəyli kənd iəd)

Mustafabəyli (village)

- Nabatkənd village municipality (Nabatkənd kənd iəd)

Nabatkənd (village)

- Nərimanov village municipality (Nərimanov kənd iəd)

Nərimanov (village)
- Musalı

- Nəsimikənd village municipality (Nəsimikənd kənd iəd)

Nəsimikənd (village)

- Novruzlu village municipality (Novruzlu kənd iəd)

Novruzlu

- Orta Muğan village municipality (Orta Muğan kənd iəd)

Orta Muğan (village)

- Sarıcalar village municipality (Sarıcalar kənd iəd)

Sarıcalar (village)

- Seyidlər village municipality (Seyidlər kənd iəd)

Seyidlər (village)

- Sımada village municipality (Sımada kənd iəd)

Sımada (village)

- Soltanabad village municipality (Soltanabad kənd iəd)

Soltanabad (village)

- Şirinbəyli village municipality (Şirinbəyli kənd iəd)

Şirinbəyli (village)

- Varxan village municipality (Varxan kənd iəd)

Varxan (village)
- Qaralar

== Gallery ==
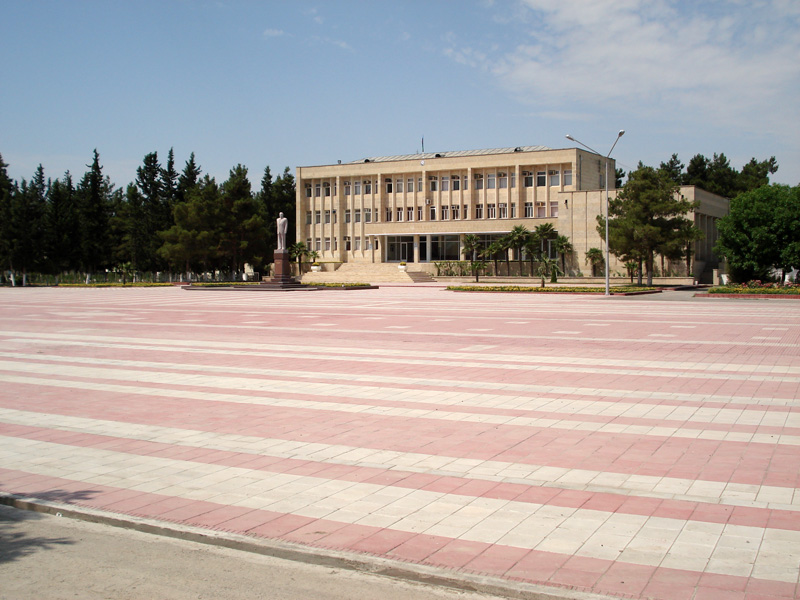
Saatly City Hall
