= Sabirabad District =

District in central Azerbaijan

Coordinates: 40°0′N 48°36′E

- District
- Map of Azerbaijan showing Sabirabad District
- Country: Azerbaijan
- Region: Mil-Mughan
- Established: 8 August 1930
- Capital: Sabirabad
- Settlements: 75

Government
  - Governor: Siragaddin Jabbarov

Area
  - Total: 1,470 km^{2} (570 sq mi)

Population (2020)
  - Total: 178,800
  - Density: 122/km^{2} (315/sq mi)
- Time zone: UTC+4 (AZT)
- Postal code: 5400
- Website: sabirabad-ih.gov.az

Sabirabad District (Azerbaijani: Sabirabad rayonu) is one of the 66 districts of Azerbaijan. Located in the centre of the country, it belongs to the Mil-Mughan Economic Region. The district borders the districts of Saatly, Imishli, Kurdamir, Hajigabul, Salyan, Bilasuvar, and the city of Shirvan. Its capital and largest city is Sabirabad. As of 2020, the district had a population of 178,800.

== History ==
The area of Sabirabad is rich with ancient monuments and settlements. As a result of the excavation in the district, ancient necropolis as well as settlements which belong to V-I, V-II, and I B.C were found in Surra, Javad, Abdulyan, Garatepe, Guruzma, Garagashil, Bulagli, Zangana and Galagayin. Materials that were found in the “Shahargah” place of the village show that the ancient findings belong to the 11th-12th centuries. Historically, some nations attacked Mughan lands known as “Khaver Zemin”, “Guneshli land”. However, all those pressures were overcome. Since that time, “Khaver Zamin” replaced with Galagayin. Currently, the Sabirabad district has Galagayin village.

The biggest village in the district is Javad which has been a historical city and the centre of the Javad Khanate. Javad became part of Quba Khanate in 1768. When Azerbaijan became a part of Russia, a number of Russians were settled in Javad. The district was named Petropavlovka in 1988.

Sabirabad district was organized on August 8, 1930. On October 7, 1931, Petropavlokva was renamed after the famous Azerbaijani satirical poet M.A.Sabir with the decree of the Azerbaijan Central Executive Committee. On May 25, 1943, Saatli District turned into an integral part of Sabirabad. The Saatli district was joined to Sabirabad on January 4, 1963, and it continued until January 14, 1965. The downtown was renamed a town-type settlement on November 7, 1952, and since December 4, 1959, the district has been called Sabirabad.

== Geography ==
The district is located in the south of Mugan plain. Rayon borders upon Kurdamir Rayon in the north for a distance of 30 km, Shamakhi Rayon in the north-west for a distance of 5 km, Shirvan city in the south for a distance of 24 km, Salyan Rayon in the south-west for a distance of 48 km, Bilasuvar Rayon in the south for a distance of 18 km, Saatly Rayon in the east for a distance of 136 km and Imishli Rayon for a distance of 8 km. Its length from the north to the south is 66 km, and from the east to the west is 24 km. A part of the rayon's territory is on the right coast of the Kura River, in Shirvan plain.

The low-lying area is dependent on canals and dams whose damage during 2010 caused waters from Lake Sarisu to flood several of the region's villages.

== Population ==
According to the State Statistics Committee, as of 2018, the population of city recorded 174,800 persons, which increased by 36400 persons (about 26 percent) from 138,400 persons in 2000. Of the total population, 87,800 are men and 87,000 are women. More than 13 percent of the population (about 46,6 persons) consists of young people and teenagers aged 14–29.

Population of district by the year (at the beginning of the year, thsd. persons)
Region	2000	2001	2002	2003	2004	2005	2006	2007	2008	2009	2010	2011	2012	2013	2014	2015	2016	2017	2018
Sabirabad region	138,4	139,8	140,6	141,4	142,3	143,9	145,7	147,9	149,7	151,2	153,1	155,4	158,9	161,9	164,6	167,5	170,3	172,7	174,8
urban population	27,4	27,5	27,5	27,6	27,7	27,9	28,0	28,1	28,2	28,2	28,4	28,6	29,0	29,2	29,4	29,8	30,2	30,5	30,6
rural population	111,0	112,3	113,1	113,8	114,6	116,0	117,7	119,8	121,5	123,0	124,7	126,8	129,9	132,7	135,2	137,7	140,1	142,2	144,2

Population distribution by ethnicity according to 2009 census:

Ethnic groups	Quantity
Azerbaijani	148571
Turkish	81
Lezgin	3
Talysh	2
Ukrainian	2
Kurds	2
Georgian	1

== Transport ==
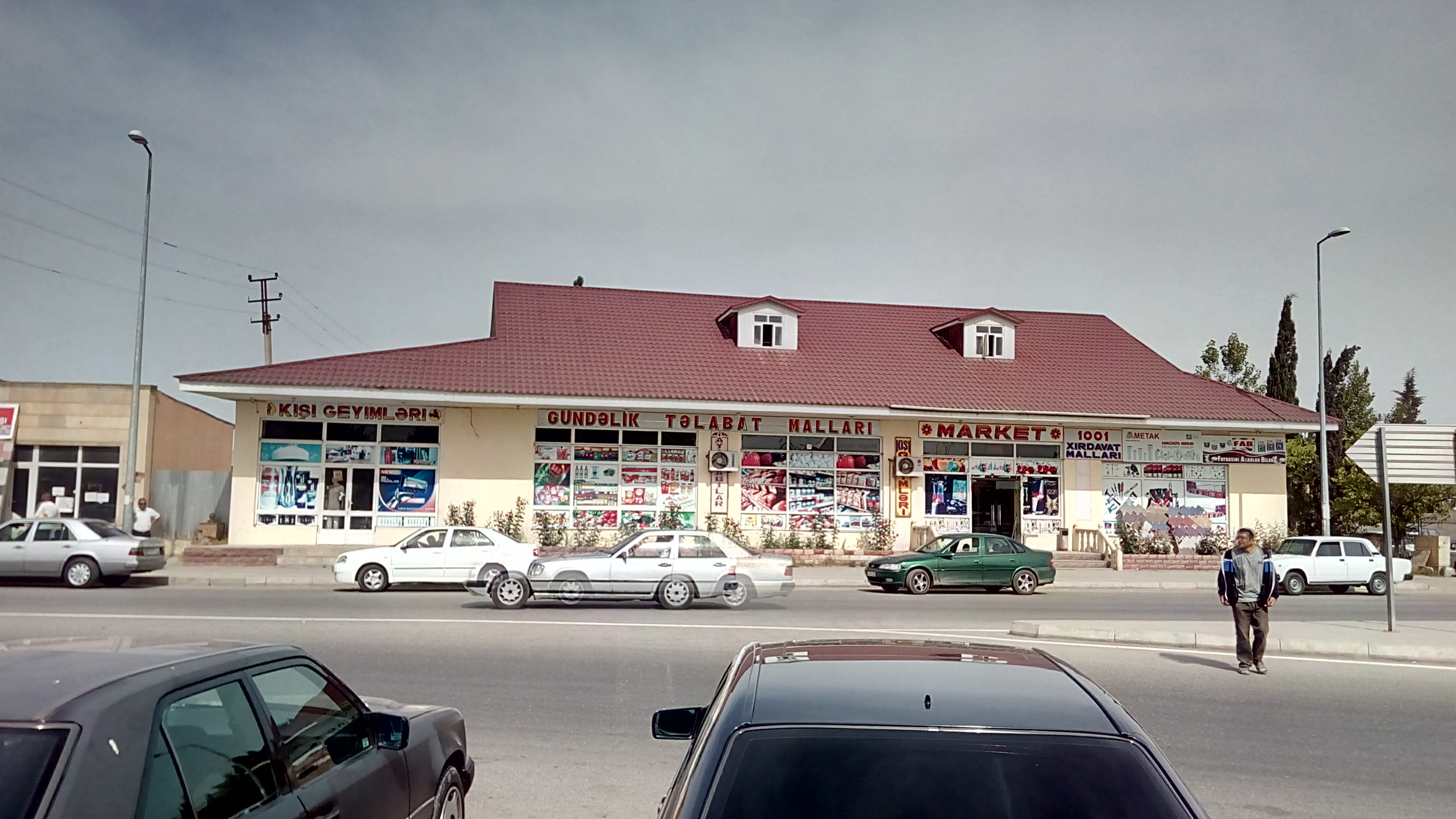
Sabirabad Road

There are 3rd and 4th category railways in the district. The roads lengthen 522 km. The country indicator is 7.9 percent. The republican significance motorway lengthens 243 km. The country indicator is 8.6%. The highway lengthens 279 km. The country indicator is 7.8 percent. Rail transport is also widely used in the region.

== Historical monuments ==
One of the oldest monuments on Sabirabad is Bad Samid's tomb, which was built in the 16th century. Another old monument is Mosque Galayagin which belongs to the 17th century, the Shemakha Mosque which was built in 1903.

== Notable natives ==
- Hasan Khan Shahseven
- Lutfiyar Imanov
- Azad Asgarov
- Yavar Jamalov
- Elvin Aliyev
- Murad Mirzayev - a National Hero of Azerbaijan

== Economy ==
2018 wheat production:

- Wheat - 15215 hectares
- Barley - 9430 hectares
- Grain - 24645 hectares

In 2018, the economic growth was equal to 39,221 thousand manats. The main sector in this region is primary. GDP of this region is 437244 manat. Production of production is equal to 18169,4 tones.
