= Society for the Restoration of Orthodox Christianity in the Caucasus =

Russian society created to spread Christianity in the Caucasus

Russian: ОВПХК
- Society for the Restoration of Orthodox Christianity in the Caucasus
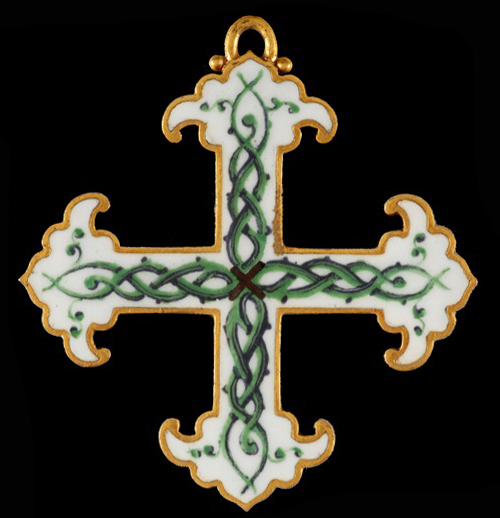
- St. Nino orden - I
- Abbreviation: Russian: ОВПХК
- Founder: Russian Empire
- Type: Religion
- Location: Tbilisi, Russian Empire
- Region served: Caucasus
- Official language: Russian
- Employees: (')

The Society for the Restoration of Orthodox Christianity in the Caucasus (Russian: Общество Восстановления Православного Христианства на Кавказе) was a public organization in the Russian Empire founded in 1860 to spread Eastern Orthodoxy in the Caucasus after it was conquered by Russian Empire in the 19th century. It was dissolved in 1917.

== History ==
As a Christian state, Russian Empire had already had the experience of converting the local population to Christianity, before the Russian conquest of Azerbaijan, across the states it conquered, especially, those inhabited by Moslems. From the mid-16th century, the Tsardom of Russia (under Tsar Ivan IV) aimed to pursue a foreign policy of conquering new territories and Christianizing indigenous people throughout these territories. During the invasion of the khanates of Kazan (1552) and Astrakhan (1556), as well as Siberia, Russia consolidated power in these occupied territories, using that exact method of Christianizing the locals and exploiting religious divisions.

The policy of evangelizing the locals from the Jar-Balakan Community and the Elisu Sultanate was carried out by means of the same methods as those used for the locals across Kazan, Astrakhan and Siberia. There were only two differences here:

- The original intent was to evangelize Ingiloys, not the entire population of the Jar-Balakan communities.
- The Georgian Church played the role of the Russian Orthodox Church in spreading Christianity to Azerbaijan.

Residents of the villages of Suskend and Shotavar refused to be Christianized. Soon after, first churches were built in Gakh and Goragan.

== Founding ==
With Russian Empire complete invasion of the Caucasus, in 1860, the Society for the Restoration of Orthodox Christianity in the Caucasus was established to spread Christianity throughout the Caucasus by the initiative of the Exarch of Georgia and Metropolitan Isidore of Kartli-Kakheti and through the efforts of the Viceroy of the Caucasus Prince Alexander Ivanovich Baryatinsky. The Society, founded by order of Russia's Tsar on June 9, 1860, was patronized by Empress of Russia Maria Alexandrovna herself. During its activity, the Society had spent 1.475.482 rubles to spread Christianity to the Caucasus, including Northwest Azerbaijan. It was headquartered in Tbilisi.

In order to run the Society, firstly, a central office and temporary management committee was set up in Tbilisi. The Temporary Committee reserved the right to make decisions on which provinces of the Caucasus, and how, to function. Prince Alexander Baryatinsky, Exarch of Georgia archbishop Eusebius member of the governorship board A. Fadeyev and member of the state council Insarsky were elected as members of the committee. In 1861, Archpriest Ioakim Romanov was also elected as a member.

== Churches built in Azerbaijan ==
- Allahverdi Church
- Kurmuk Church
- Saint Nino Church
- St George's Church, Qakh
- Kotokli Church
