= Eastern Orthodoxy in Azerbaijan =

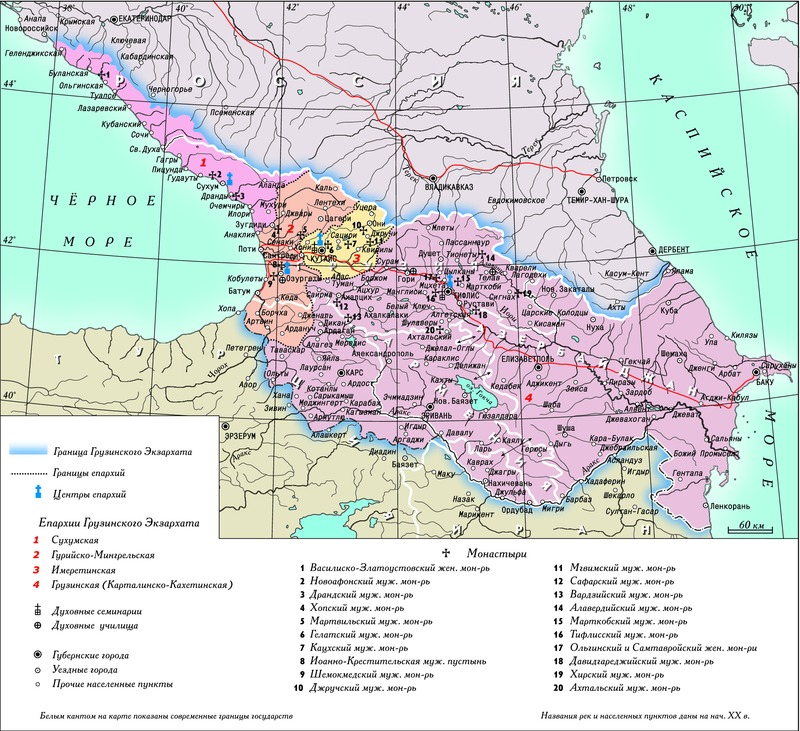
During the 19th century, the Georgian Exarchate of the Russian Orthodox Church included the territory of modern-day Azerbaijan

Eastern Orthodoxy in Azerbaijan is the main Christian and the second largest religious group in the Republic of Azerbaijan (after Islam). According to statistics, the Eastern Orthodox, or Byzantine tradition in Azerbaijan is 1.6% (143 thousand people). The territory of Azerbaijan is in the jurisdiction of the Baku-Azerbaijan Diocese of the Russian Orthodox Church.

== History of Eastern Orthodoxy in Azerbaijan ==
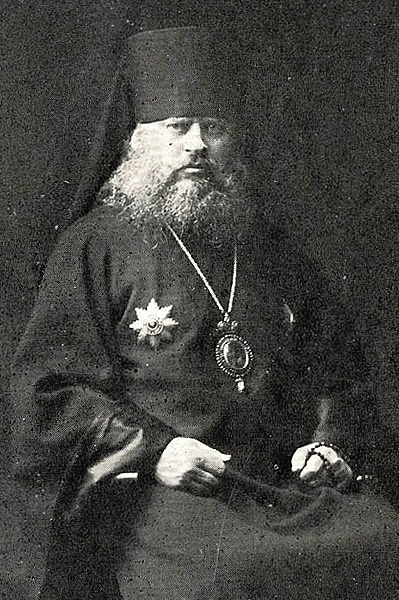
Metropolitan Platon (Rozhdestvensky) of Tbilisi and Baku, and Exarch of Caucasus (1917–1918)

Year	Total numbers	Slavic-Orthodox population share
1897	95,736	5.6
1926	241,653	0.6
1939	553,433	17.3
1959	531,344	14.3
1970	544,148	10.6
1979	506,439	8.4
1989	432,482	6.2
1999	170,700	2.1
2009	143,800	1.6

Serious changes in the Caucasian Albanian church occurred under the Arab rule, when the Catholicos Nerses I Bakur (688–704) attempted to convert to Chalcedonism, thus recognizing the spiritual authority of Constantinople. He was deposed by the Grand Duke of Albania Shero and other feudal lords who remained faithful to the Albanian church, and cursed at the national church cathedral. In 705, it fell under the religious jurisdiction of the Armenian Apostolic Church as the Catholicosate of Aghvank. The Caucasian Albanian tribes were divided between the Chalcedonian Georgian Orthodox North centered around the bishopric of Kish and the Armenian Apostolic Church of the south. In the second half of the 10th century, the population of the left-bank Albania (Hereti) was included in the sphere of influence of the decision of the Chalcedon Council of the Georgian Church, adopted in the 7th century and got a great impact of Georgia.

When the territories of Transcaucasia entered the Russian Empire, jurisdiction of Georgian Exarchate was expanded, encompassing territories of modern-day Georgia, Armenia and Azerbaijan. In 1905, Eparchy of Baku, nowadays Baku and Caspian Eparchy, was established. The Albanian Catholicos of the church in 1813 by the decree of Tsar Nicholas I passed into the status of the metropolite of the Albanian church.

Eastern Orthodoxy became wide spread in Azerbaijan at the beginning of the 19th century.

== Eastern Orthodoxy in Azerbaijan nowadays ==
In 1815, the first Russian Orthodox church appeared in Baku. Later such churches were built in Ganja, Goranboy (Borisi-Russian village, 1842), Shemakha (Alty-Aghadj village, 1834), Lankaran (Vel village, 1838), and Gedabek (Slavyanka village, 1844).

There were 21 sectarian villages in Baku during 1868.

In 1905, the Baku Diocese of the Russian Orthodox Church was established. During the Soviet era, the authorities repressed the priests of the Baku diocese, but in 1944 two churches were opened.

In 1998, the Baku-Caspian Diocese of the Russian Orthodox Church was established. On March 22, 2011, the decision of the Holy Synod of the Russian Orthodox Church was changed to the Baku-Caspian diocese in Baku-Azerbaijan.

In 2011 there were six Eastern Orthodox churches in the country. Five of them belong to the Russian Orthodox church (ROC): three of them are located in Baku one in Ganja and one in Khachmaz.

Another temple belongs to the jurisdiction of the Georgian Orthodox Church - the Church of St. George in the village of Gakh-Inguila in the Qakh district, where the Ingiloy Georgians live compactly (about 7,500 people).

In 2013, November, President Ilham Aliyev participated in the opening ceremony of Orthodox Religious and Cultural Center of Baku and Azerbaijan Eparchy. Firstly^{,} The President visited the Holy Myrrhbearers Cathedral.

There is also the Michael Archangel's Temple in the capital city Baku.

== The Albanian-Udin Christian community ==
In 2001, during his visit to Azerbaijan, Patriarch Alexe II met with representatives of the Udin community who expressed the desire of their people to join the ROC. However, this did not lead to any real results, and the community of Udin remained outside the church's nourishment.

On May 28, 2003, the Albanian-Udin Christian community was established in Azerbaijan. The Chairman of the community was Robert Mobilea. This was due to the restoration of the ancient Kish temple in Shaki (according to legend, the foundation was laid by the apostle Eliseus). In 2006, the restoration of the second Udin temple, the church in the village of Nij, Azerbaijan Gabalinsky district, was completed. Restoration works are also continued in the village of Gum of the Gakh region and the basilica in the village of Gyumriuk with the intention of restoration of the Albanian basilica which is related to the 5th century.

In 2006, the bishop of Baku and the Caspian Sea, Alexander (Ishchein), reported that Orthodox worship will be performed in Udin churches, and priests for them are trained in Russian religious schools. The Baku diocese of the Russian Orthodox Church took part in some solemn events, and even held baptisms, but there is no general progress on the involving of Udin into the ROC. Meanwhile, the Albanian-Udin Christian community exists in the form of a separate ethno-religious group with its own ideas about the "Udin Church", in which rituals are conducted not by canonical clergymen, but by the members of the community. In particular, the right to baptize was taken over by the Chairman of the AUHO Robert Mobilea and the self-styled "spiritual figure" Rafik Danakari.

== See also ==
- Religion in Azerbaijan
- Christianity in Azerbaijan
- Russian Orthodox Church in Azerbaijan
- Georgian Orthodox Church in Azerbaijan

== Literature ==
- Timothy C. Dowling “Russia at War: From the Mongol Conquest to Afghanistan, Chechnya, and Beyond”, 2014, 728pp, ISBN 1598849484
- Meyendorff, John (1989). Imperial unity and Christian divisions: The Church 450-680 A.D. Crestwood, NY: St. Vladimir's Seminary Press. ISBN 9780881410563.
- Vladimir Moss, The Orthodox Church in the Twentieth Century
