= Georgian Orthodox Church in Azerbaijan =

The Georgian Orthodox Church is a form of Orthodox Christianity in Azerbaijan. Georgian Churches in Azerbaijan are under jurisdiction of Eparchy of Khornabuji and Hereti.

Eparchies of the Georgian Apostolic Autocephalous Orthodox Church as of 2010.

== Churches ==
Church name	Picture	Status
Kurmukhi Church (Kürmük məbədi)		abandoned
Church of Kish (Kiş kilsəsi)		abandoned
Meshebashi (Müqəddəs Mixeyil kilsəsi)		abandoned
St George's Church, Qakh (Müqəddəs Georgi kilsəsi)		active
Patara Alaverdi (Allahverdi kilsəsi)		active
Church of Alibeglo (Müqəddəs Nino kilsəsi)		active
Kotokli Church (Müqəddəs Üçlük kilsəsi)		active
Zedzgiti Church (Zəyzid kilsəsi)		ruins
Lekarti Monastery (Ləkit məbədi)		ruins
Mamrukhi Church (Mamrux kilsəsi)		ruins
Bideizi (Bideyiz kilsəsi)		ruins
Church of the Mother of God (Qum bazilikası)		ruins
Katekhi Church (Katex kilsəsi)		ruins
Seven Church monastery complex (Yeddi Kilsə monastır kompleksi)		ruins
Dzelitskhoveli (Mazımçay kilsəsi)		ruins
Bakhtala church		ruins
Boetani Church		ruins
Vachnadziant Church (Talalar kilsəsi)		ruins
Church of Zarna (Kilsə qalıqları)		ruins
Rochahmed Church (Roçəhməd Məbədi)		ruins

== See also ==
- Christianity in Azerbaijan
