= Ingiloy people =

Ethnographic subgroup of Georgians

Ingiloy İngiloylar ჰერები Herebi
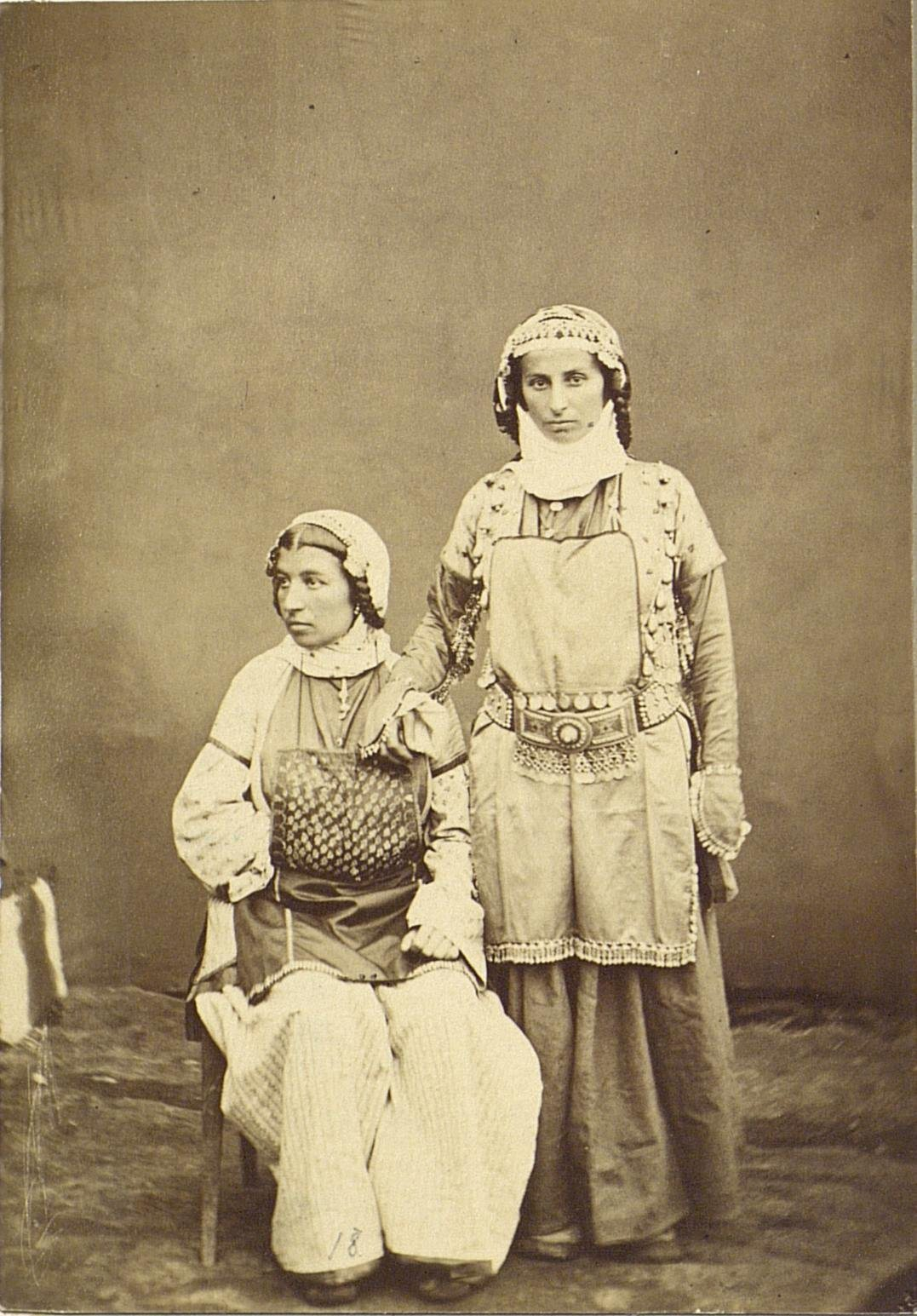
- Pair of Ingiloy girls photographed in Qakh, Azerbaijan

Total population
- 12,000

Languages
- Ingiloan dialect of Georgian

Religion
- Predominantly Sunni Muslim; Minority Georgian Orthodox Christianity

Ingiloys (Note: Brockhaus and Efron Encyclopedic Dictionary states that Ingiloys are an alternative name to Muslim Georgians. It has been associated with the Old Turkish word yangili ("newly converted").) (Georgian: ინგილოები; Azerbaijani: İngiloylar), natively known as Heretians (Georgian: ჰერები, romanized: herebi) are an ethnographic subgroup of Georgians who speak the Ingiloy dialect of Georgian. Ingiloys are indigenous to Saingilo (formerly known as Hereti), a cultural and historical region located in the northwest of present-day Azerbaijan.

== History ==
According to traditional accounts, the name of the Heretians (that is of Ingiloys) originates from the legendary patriarch "Heros", the son of Thargamos, who founded the city of Hereti (later known as Khoranta) at the Alazani River. With the decline of Caucasian Albania, the area was gradually incorporated into the Iberian kingdom, forming one of its duchies (saeristavo). Throughout the 5th century its peoples were eventually assimilated into the Georgians proper.

During the Arab occupation the region was a separate kingdom within Georgian cultural and political influence. Hereti eventually became part of the Kingdom of Kakheti and Hereti. The latter was annexed to the Georgian Kingdom in 1104. In the Middle Ages, seven Georgian schools operated in Hereti which included courses of theology, philosophy, orthography, church history, and the history of Georgia and for the students. In the 15th century the term "Hereti" gradually disappeared from the political nomenclature and was replaced by the word "Kakheti".

In the early 17th century, Shah Abbas I of Safavid of Persia took these lands from the king of Kakheti and granted them to the Dagestani feudal clans. As a result of raids (Lekianoba) conducted by bands of Avar and Tsakhur warriors in Saingilo, the Ingiloys became serfs of the Dagestanian rulers, who forced them to pay tribute. In this way, gradually, by peaceful or hostile means, these tribes settled in Saingilo and colonized it. Already after the foundation of the sultanate of Elisu the conquerors had, by a concerted effort, undertaken the Islamization of the region.

After 1801, when the Kingdom of Kartli-Kakheti (eastern Georgia) became part of the Russian Empire the region ended up in the Imperial Russian conquest in 1803, Saingilo was initially incorporated into Zakatal Okrug of Tiflis Governorate. From 1918 to 1920 both Democratic Republic of Georgia (DRG) and Azerbaijan Democratic Republic (ADR) claimed its territory as theirs, but the dispute never led to an armed confrontation. After the fall of the ADR in 1920, Soviet Russia and Azerbaijan SSR recognized it as part of Georgia, whose government granted these lands a degree of internal autonomy. Following the Red army invasion of Georgia in 1921, the area was officially transferred to the jurisdiction and control of the Azerbaijan SSR by the central communist government in Moscow in 1922.

== Population ==
=== Demographics ===
| 1926 | 1939 | 1959 | 1970 | 1979 | 1989 | 1999 |
|---|---|---|---|---|---|---|
| 9500 | 10 196 | 9526 | 13 595 | 11 412 | 14 197 | 14 900 |

Heretians (incl. Ingiloys)

Distribution of the Ingiloan dialect

==== Census 2009 ====
As of the census of 2009, the number of Georgians fell to a record low of 9,900 people. Most of them live in the Qax district (7,447 people) or in the city of Baku (2,226 people).

=== Geographical distribution ===
The majority of the Ingiloys today live in an area they call Saingilo, the name of the cultural region traditionally inhabited by the Ingiloys (Heretian) people in modern northwestern part of Azerbaijan. The Saingilo area — territory of 4,780 km^{2} — traditionally includes the Balakan, Zaqatala and Qakh districts.

| Country | Concentration |
|---|---|
| Azerbaijan | Muslim Ingiloys: Zaqatala District: Əliabad and Mosul; Balakan District: İtitala; Christian Ingiloys: Qakh District: Qax İngiloy, Böyük Alatəmir, Qaxbaş, Əlibəyli, Meşəbaş, Xələftala, Qarameşə |

=== Religion ===
By religion, Ingiloys are mostly Sunni Muslim with a minority practicing Orthodox Christians. As a result of missionary activities of the Orthodox Christianity Restoration Society, some Ingiloys converted to Christianity in 1860, and even creating 12 laities, but in 1863 most of those who converted, later reverted to Islam.

Most Ingiloys are Sunni Muslims. They converted in the 17th century via Lezghin and Ottoman influence.

There are three active Georgian Orthodox Churches in Qakh district (Saint George's Church in Qakh Ingiloy village, Patara Alaverdi in Qax, Saint Nino's Church in Alibeyli village). Georgian Churches in Azerbaijan are under jurisdiction of Eparchy of Khornabuji and Hereti.

== Culture ==
In the village Alibeyli, there is Qakh State Georgian Drama Theatre. In 2009, documentary called "Ingiloys", dedicated to history, culture, traditions of this ethnic group was filmed in Azerbaijanfilm.

There are seven Georgian schools in Saingilo, while four Azerbaijani schools have Georgian sectors. Georgian language teachers are hired by education authorities of Zaqatala and Qax districts.

=== Traditional clothing ===
The women's traditional costume consisted of a long shirt, trousers, an apron, an archaluk, and a headdress. In the late 19th and early 20th centuries the traditional costumes were fully preserved, even up until 1930s. The traditional costume of the Ingiloys are very similar to the costumes of the neighbouring Azerbaijanis, Tsakhurs and Avars inhabiting the Balakan, Zaqatala and Qakh districts. Local and factory-made fabrics were used to make clothing in the 19th and early 20th centuries. Woolen fabrics of local production were widely marketed. The villages of Muxax, İlisu, and Sarıbaş were most famous for the production of woolen fabrics (shawls). For sewing clothes, the population also bought factory fabrics, mainly cotton and silk. A significant place was occupied by silk fabrics of the local Azerbaijani production.

=== Vernacular architecture of the Ingiloy Georgians ===
==== Types of Dwellings ====
The most ancient type of dwelling used by Georgians would be the "darbazi" type house. Analogues dwelling of the darbazi type house were common in Saingilo too. The erdoiani - akariani dwellings represent the same types of houses but with some changes. The composition of the erdoiani - akariani dwellings resemble the design of Kartlian Darbazi houses. The erdoiani - akariani houses have lost the importance of the "mother pillar" ("dedabodzi" in Georgian) that Darbazi type houses have, instead the pillars in erdoiani - akarani dwellings simply just act as a support. Wooden houses were common in Saingilo. The design of wooden houses was similar to the Erdoiani Akarani houses. The wooden houses in Saingilo have peculiar parallels with the houses found in Colchis, the far western black sea regions of Georgia. However most commonly Ingilo houses are made of bricks and stone.

==== Other structures ====
Gates (Darvaza) were one of the most important features on the Ingilo farmstead. Often the wooden parts of the Darvaza were decorated with carvings and fretwork.

Since olden times farm buildings of the following types have been popular in Saingilo: cattle - shed ("cow - house"), "kasrbegeli" (barrel - barn), hayloft, wine cellar, mills, etc. First the housing for livestock was separated from the dwelling "karami" and it was called "cow - house". As for the tradition of storing grain, it is still retained by "akari" and that is why even today it has not lost its original function. This is the reason why in farmsteads of Saingilo you can hardly find a maize granary, barn, "khula" (place where food products are stored), etc.

==== Ornamental work ====
Wood carving was a common form of decorating a house. There were two main types of carving utilised by the Ingiloys. The first was carving on to a blank background and the second was wooden fretwork. The first variety of wood carving was usually used in interiors of houses, namely while decorating the "dedabodzi", small shelves ("Korte") and shrines. The second technique of fretting was used most commonly for banisters and on the gate to the farmstead, "Darvaza". Patterns used in Ingiloy wood carvings are common in other Georgian ethnographic groups such as the Borjgali.Stone carving is also present in Ingilo traditional architecture. Churches were often adorned with stone carvings.

== Notable Ingiloys ==
- Mose Janashvili (1855–1934), Georgian historian, ethnographer, and linguist.

== See also ==
- Kakhetians
- Kingdom of Hereti
- Azerbaijan–Georgia relations

== Bibliography ==
- Aivazishvili-Gehne, Nino (2023). Staatsbürgerschaft an der Grenze. Die georgischsprachigen Ingiloer in Aserbaidschan [Citizenship at the border. The Georgian-speaking Ingiloy people in Azerbaijan]. Kaukasienstudien, vol. 14. Wiesbaden: Reichert, ISBN 9783752007138 (in German).
- Akiner, Shirin (1986). Islamic Peoples of the Soviet Union: An Historical and Statistical Handbook. 2nd ed., 251–252. London: KPI.
- Bennigsen, Alexandre, and S. Enders Wimbush (1986). Muslims of the Soviet Empire: A Guide, 208–209. Bloomington: Indiana University Press.
- Changashvili, G. Z. (1970). Saingilo: Geographic-historical Study (in Georgian). Tbilisi.
- Dumbadze, M. (1953). Iz istorii Vostochnoi Kakhetii (Saingilo) (From the history of Eastern Kakheti [Saingilo]). Tbilisi.
- von Plotto, A. (1870). "Priroda i liudi Zakatal'skogo okruga" (Ecology and people of the Zakatal district). Sbornik Svedenii o Kavkazskikh Gortsakh (Tbilisi) 4.
