= IDS Ukraine =

Ukrainian beverage company group

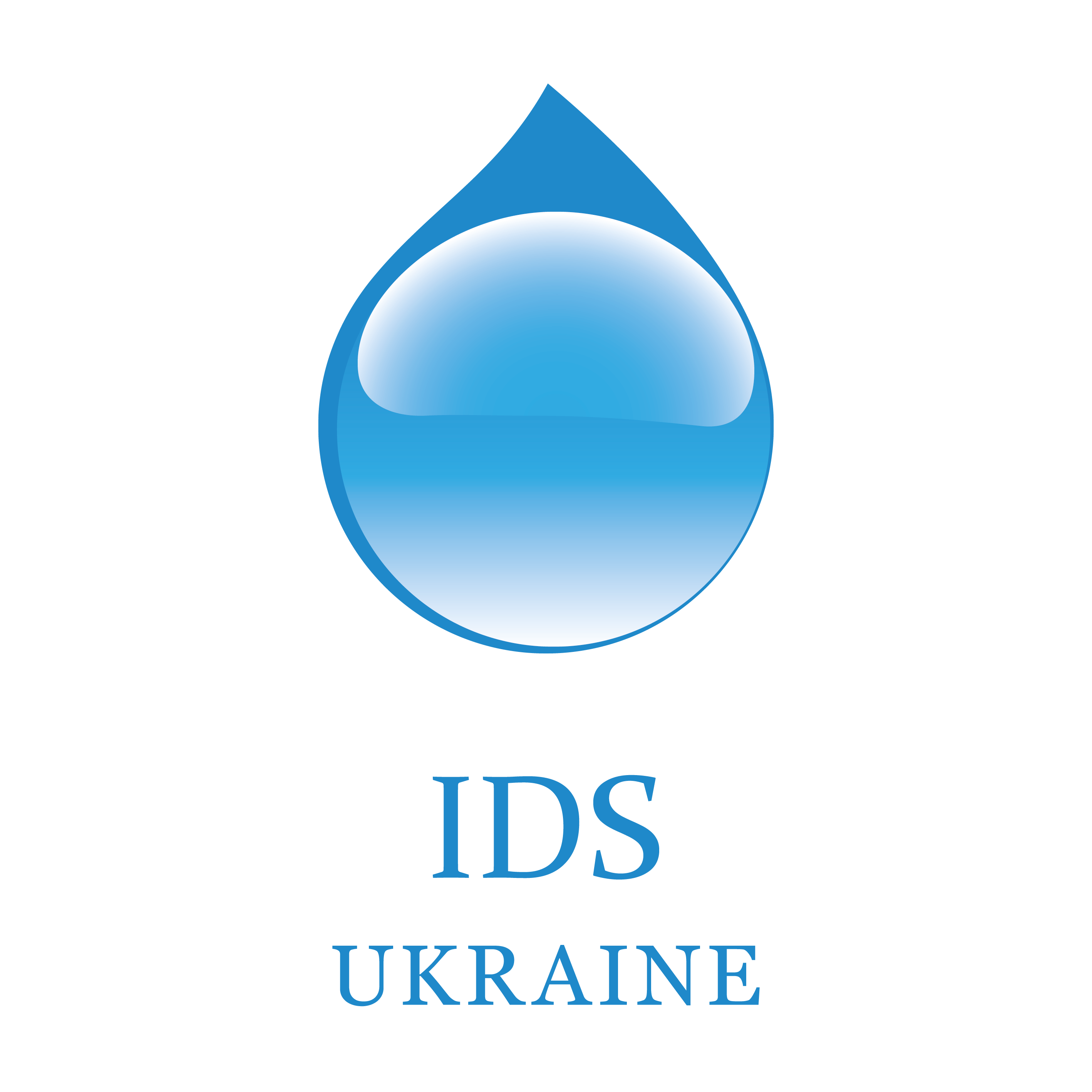
- Industry: mineral waters
- Founded: 1996
- Headquarters: Kyiv, Ukraine
- Operating income: ▲7.4 billion UAH (+7%, 2025)
- Net income: ▲708 million UAH (2024)
- Website: www.ids.ua

IDS Ukraine is a Ukrainian group of companies specialising in the production of mineral water and beverages with a share of the bottled drinking water market in Ukraine of around 40 per cent. It produces products under the brand names ‘Morshynska’, ‘Morshynka’, ‘Morshynska with flavour’, ‘Morshynska Sport’, ‘Sportik’, ‘Mirgorodska’, ‘Alaska’, ‘Aqua Life’, ‘Lemonade’ and the energy drink ‘Volya’.

== Shareholders and management ==
On 13 June 2022, the majority shareholder transferred 7.73 per cent of the company’s shares to the Georgian government free of charge and lost control of the company. The Georgian government appointed one of its representatives to the company’s board of directors; this representative became chairman of the board and gained the right to influence the company’s final decisions.

As of March 2026, 34 per cent of the shares are held by the Patarkatsishvili family, 7.73 per cent by the Georgian government, and 7.75 per cent by minority shareholders, including Ukrainian nationals, amongst whom are members of the company’s senior management. In other words, more than 50 per cent of the shares are held by individuals who are not subject to sanctions, which ensures that IDS Ukraine’s corporate governance is independent of those subject to sanctions.

Since June 2022, 100 per cent of the corporate rights of all the group’s companies have been frozen. As a result of the freezing of corporate rights and the sanctions imposed by the National Security and Defence Council of Ukraine (NSDC) on the group’s parent company, IDS Ukraine, the shareholders subject to sanctions, like the other shareholders, have completely lost their influence over the management of the company. Within the ownership structure of IDS Ukraine, there are no shareholders with a controlling stake capable of exerting sole influence over management decisions; in other words, the company has no ultimate beneficial owner.

Since 2022, strategic management of the companies within the IDS Ukraine group has been carried out by the board of directors, which is chaired by its minority shareholder and director of corporate affairs, Vsevolod Bilas, founder of the 'Morshynska' brand.

Most of the management team have been with the company for over 15 years. Day-to-day operations are overseen by Marco Tkachuk, CEO of IDS Ukraine, who has held this position since 2005. In 2025, he was named one of Ukraine's top 20 company leaders by TOP-100 magazine and the Delo.ua portal, and won the ‘Leader of Dynamic Development’ award.

== Market share and sales structure of brands ==
IDS Ukraine was founded in 1996. The group comprises the following companies:

- The ‘Oscar’ Mineral Water Plant in Morshyn;
- The Mirgorod Mineral Water Plant (MZMV);
- Distribution company ‘Industrial and Distribution Systems’ (IDS);
- IDS ‘Aqua Service’ — operator of the My Water Shop water and related products delivery service;
- ‘Potuzhnost’ Ltd;
- ‘IVA’ Private Enterprise;
- ‘Nova.Com’.

The ‘Nova.Com’ plant, which produces 'Alaska' brand drinking water in 18.9-litre containers and was located in the town of Hola Prystan in the Kherson region, ceased operations in May 2022 due to hostilities in the area and the subsequent occupation of part of the region. The bottling of 'Alaska' brand products continues at the company's plants in Myrhorod and Morshyn.

== Businesses ==
The ‘Oskar’ mineral water plant in Morshyn was established in 1995 for the industrial bottling of 'Morshynska' natural table mineral water. By the end of 2021, the plant was operating six PET bottle filling lines, one aluminium can filling line and one glass bottle filling line. In 2022, the plant launched an aseptic mineral water bottling line: investment in this equipment amounted to 450 million UAH. The plant’s total capacity allows it to produce up to 5 million bottles of various sizes per day. The plant produces mineral water under the 'Morshynska', 'Morshynka' and 'Alaska' brands, as well as flavoured 'Morshynska' drinks, the 'Limonada' brand and the 'Volya' energy drink.

The Mirgorod Mineral Water Plant (MZMV) was founded in 1927. A new plant was commissioned in early 1974, and in 1996, MZMV began a partnership with the IDS Group. The plant is equipped with two production lines for bottling products in PET bottles ranging in volume from 0.5 to 5 litres, and one bottling line for 18.9-litre polycarbonate bottles. The plant’s most powerful line is capable of bottling up to 30,000 bottles of water per hour. The plant produces mineral water under the ‘Mirgorodska’ and ‘Mirgorodska Lagidna’ brands, as well as drinking water under the ‘Alaska’ and ‘Aqua Life’ brands.

IDS Aqua Service (brand marketplace MyWaterShop) is a distribution and logistics company that provides a Home & Office Delivery service (delivery of the company’s products and related goods to homes and offices) in 1,583 localities across the territory under Ukraine’s control. According to IDS Ukraine, IDS Aqua Service generates around 10 per cent of the group’s revenue.

The current structure of the IDS Ukraine Group consists of organisationally linked companies, with PrJSC ‘Industrial and Distribution Systems’ as the parent company. It handles the procurement of raw materials and consumables for its enterprises – the Myrhorod Mineral Water Plant and the Morshyn ‘Oscar’ Mineral Water Plant; the sales, distribution and logistics of products on a nationwide scale; brand development, advertising and marketing; as well as the investments required for the technological and innovative development of all the group’s enterprises.

The company is represented on the bottled water market in Ukraine by the ‘Morshynska’, ‘Mirgorodska’, ‘Alaska’ and ‘Aqua Life’ brands. In early 2023, the company entered the energy drink segment with a drink called ‘Volya’ under the ‘Morshynska’ brand. In the same year, the first naturally-based lemonade under the ‘Limonada’ brand was added to the range (a carbonated drink made from water from the Morshyn springs and natural juices, with no colourings or preservatives). In 2024, the range of juice-based drinks was expanded to include ‘Morshynska’ in various flavours (a still drink made from water from the Morshyn springs and natural juices). In March 2026, the company announced the expansion of its product portfolio and its entry into the promising ready-to-drink tea (RTD-T) segment. The Morshynska tea range is made not from dried tea extract, but from an infusion.

According to IDS Ukraine, the plants in Myrhorod and Morshyn are key employers in their local communities and critically important contributors to local budgets. As of early July 2025, IDS Ukraine provides employment for over 3,000 Ukrainians: in addition to staff employed directly by the group’s companies, IDS Ukraine helps to create new jobs with its distribution and logistics partners, enabling the recruitment of a further 500 or so employees to meet the company’s logistics needs and support product sales.

In 2021, IDS Ukraine’s flagship brand, ‘Morshynska’ – valued at $525 million – topped the list of the most valuable national brands.

In 2022, ‘Morshynska’ went on sale in Poland. The company’s products are also available in other overseas markets, notably in Moldova and Israel.

In 2025, the ‘Morshyn “Oscar” Mineral Water Plant’ successfully passed a recertification audit against the international FSSC 22000 (v6.0) standard without any findings. This food safety certification scheme is recognised by global retailers and serves as a gateway to international markets.

== Brands ==
IDS Ukraine’s brand portfolio includes the following trademarks:

- ‘Morshynska’ is natural mineral spring water. According to a study by Pro Consulting, the brand is the leader in the Ukrainian market’s natural water segment, with a market share of around 33 per cent. It is sourced in the resort region of Morshyn.
- ‘Mirgorodska’ is a natural sodium chloride mineral water extracted from the Mirgorod deposit.
- ‘Alaska’ is a brand of drinking water, primarily available in the home and office delivery (HOD) segment.
- Aqua Life – still drinking water.
- ‘Limonada’ – a range of non-alcoholic juice-based drinks.
- ‘Morshynska’ flavoured – a range of still drinks.
- ‘Morshynska’ scented – a range of fizzy drinks.
- ‘Volya’ – an energy drink made using natural ‘Morshynska’ water.
- ‘Sportik’ and ‘Teens’ – specialised ranges of drinking water for children and teenagers.
- Morshynska tea – ready-to-drink cold tea (RTD T).

== Market share and sales structure of brands ==
PJSC ‘MZMV “OSKAR”’ and PJSC ‘Mirgorod Mineral Water Plant’, part of the IDS Ukraine group, are the largest producers of drinking water in Ukraine, accounting for a share of around 40 per cent of the domestic mineral water market in volume terms in 2024.

IDS Ukraine’s brands’ market shares in the bottled water market, in monetary terms, %

Trademark	2022	2023	2024
‘Morshynska’	32,73 %	33,23 %	33,48 %
‘Mirgorodska’	4,74 %	4,42 %	4,31 %
‘Mirgorodska Lagidna’	1,65 %	1,54 %	1,50 %
Aqua Life	0,87 %	0,97 %	1,07 %

== Social Responsibility ==
In 2025, IDS Ukraine paid 1.3 billion hryvnias in taxes and duties, which is 12.7 per cent more than in 2024. The company’s total fiscal payments over the four years of the Russian Federation’s full-scale invasion of Ukraine amount to over 3.94 billion hryvnias.

The ‘Oscar’ mineral water plant in Morshyn paid 409 million hryvnias in taxes for 2025. This is more than 10 per cent higher than the previous year’s figure (370.4 million hryvnias).

The Myrhorod Mineral Water Plant generated revenue of 176 million hryvnias, which is 6.5 per cent more than last year (164.6 million hryvnias).

The total amount of charitable aid since the start of the full-scale invasion now stands at over 638 million UAH. In terms of the amount spent on charitable initiatives, IDS Ukraine features on the list of the largest corporate donors according to the nv.ua ranking, which includes Ukraine’s most prominent private donor companies. The company has focused its efforts on three areas: supporting the military, including mobilised employees; assisting in the rehabilitation of defenders; and supplying water to hospitals, clinics and the population lacking access to safe drinking water in war-affected regions. IDS Ukraine also provides systematic support to the Next Step Ukraine rehabilitation centre and has already allocated over 3.7 million UAH towards rehabilitation and prosthetics.

One of the company’s largest investment projects for 2024–2025 is the construction of its own solar power generation facilities, with investment in these projects set to reach 530,000 euros (excluding VAT) over these years. Two solar power stations with a combined rated capacity of 3 MW will be operational to meet the energy needs of the production facilities in Morshyn and Myrhorod.

Since the start of the Russian Federation’s full-scale invasion of Ukraine, the company has been actively providing social and charitable assistance, including supplying water to the local population and Ukrainian military personnel in conflict zones, in partnership with voluntary organisations, as well as with regional state administrations, the Armed Forces of Ukraine and the Territorial Defence Forces.

IDS Ukraine was one of the first organisations to provide humanitarian aid to residents of Ukraine’s southern regions who were affected by the breach of the Kakhovka hydroelectric power station dam. The company delivered over 5 million litres of drinking water, worth 35 million hryvnias, to the affected regions and communities for free distribution to those in need. With the support of the Office of the President of Ukraine and in close cooperation with the military administrations, the steady flow of humanitarian supplies of drinking water to residents of affected communities and settlements reached 300,000 litres per day.

British citizens, the heirs of the Georgian businessman Badri Patarkatsishvili, who are co-owners of IDS Ukraine and are not subject to sanctions, have provided significant charitable financial support to Ukraine, amounting to approximately $2,645 million, via the United24 platform.

== Nationalisation ==
According to an independent valuation commissioned by the shareholders of IDS Ukraine Black Waters Limited and carried out in early 2025, the total value of the corporate rights of the parent company of the IDS Ukraine Group, PrJSC 'Industrial and Distribution Systems', and PrJSC 'Morshyn Mineral Water Plant "Oscar"' is estimated at 5.8 billion UAH. Specifically:

- the value of the corporate rights of PJSC ‘Industrial and Distribution Systems’ is 3 billion UAH, equivalent to $75 million;
- the value of the corporate rights of Private Joint-Stock Company ‘Morshyn Mineral Water Plant “Oscar”’ is 2.8 billion hryvnias, equivalent to $68 million.

On 25 September 2024, the Ministry of Justice of Ukraine filed a claim with the High Anti-Corruption Court of Ukraine seeking the confiscation of assets belonging to Russian oligarchs Mikhail Friedman, Pyotr Aven, Andriy Kosogov and the company Rissa Investments Limited. Among other companies, the state is seeking to recover 100 per cent of the total shares in Mirgorod Mineral Water Plant PJSC, Morshyn Mineral Water Plant ‘Oscar’ PJSC and Industrial and Distribution Systems PJSC. For its part, the IDS Ukraine group of companies stated in its declaration that the issue of asset nationalisation falls within the sphere of interest of the shareholders, whilst the management’s task is to ensure the stable operation of the group.

== Awards ==
The company, its senior management and its products have repeatedly featured in national rankings and won industry and national awards:

- inclusion in the list of the ‘Top 20 Ukrainian companies building energy independence’ according to Delo.ua (2024)
- ranking among the largest taxpayers in Ukraine among private companies and banks according to NV (2024)
- inclusion in the list of the largest donors to humanitarian causes and in support of the Armed Forces of Ukraine following three years of war (NV ranking, 2025)
- recognition of the company as one of Ukraine’s Top 10 most resilient employers (DS ranking, 2025)[4]; included in the ranking of Ukraine’s best employers in 2024 (Delo.ua)
- featured in the ranking of the 'Top 15 companies shaping Ukraine's future' (DS ranking, 2024).

== Additional sources ==
- ids.ua — official site
- site ТМ «Миргородська»
- site ТМ «Моршинська»
