= Church of Alibeglo =

Church in Qakh District, Azerbaijan

Church of St. Nino ალიბეგლოს წმინდა ნინოს ეკლესია
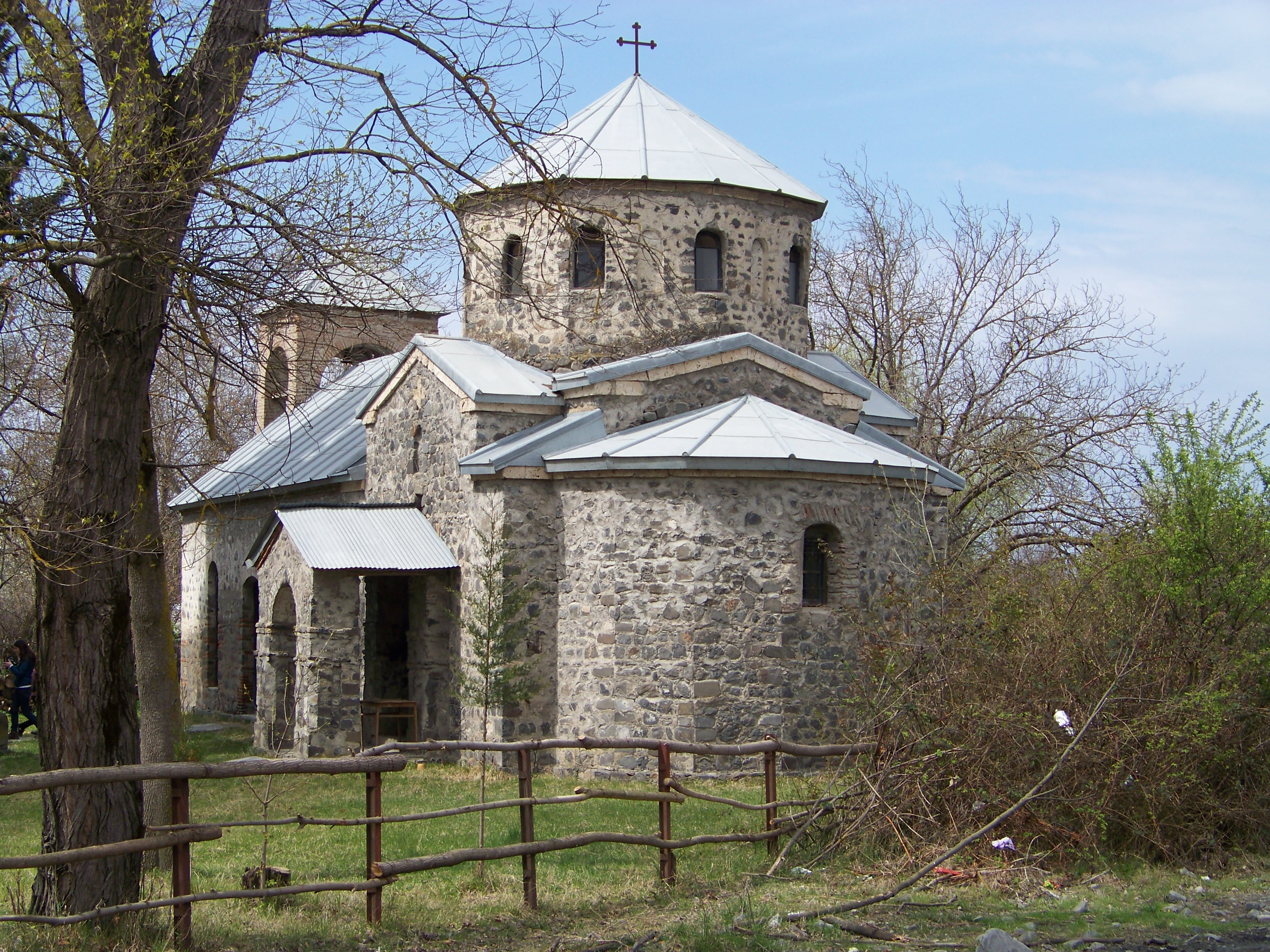

- Location within Azerbaijan

Religion
- Affiliation: Georgian Orthodox Church
- Status: Active

Location
- Location: Qakh District, Azerbaijan
- Coordinates: 41.376529°N 46.833877°E

St. Nino Church of Alibeglo (Georgian: ალიბეგლოს წმინდა ნინოს ეკლესია) is a Georgian Orthodox Church located in Qakh District, northwestern Azerbaijan, on the border with Georgia. The last time it was renovated by the local community was in the period of the reintroduction of Christianity in Hereti (Saingilo), between 1850-1855. The church is of kuppelhalle (domed rectangle) type with a projecting apse and an elongated west arm. The church has a bell-tower to its west.

== See also ==
- Kurmukhi Church
- St George's Church, Qakh

== Sources ==
- Hausleiter, A.; M. Roaf; St J. Simpson; R. Wenke; P. Flensted Jensen; R. Talbert; T. Elliott; S. Gillies. "Places: 912964 (Tigris/Diglitus fl.)". Pleiades.
- Managing the Tigris and Euphrates Watershed
- Bibliography on Water Resources and International Law
