= Azerbaijan–Georgia relations =

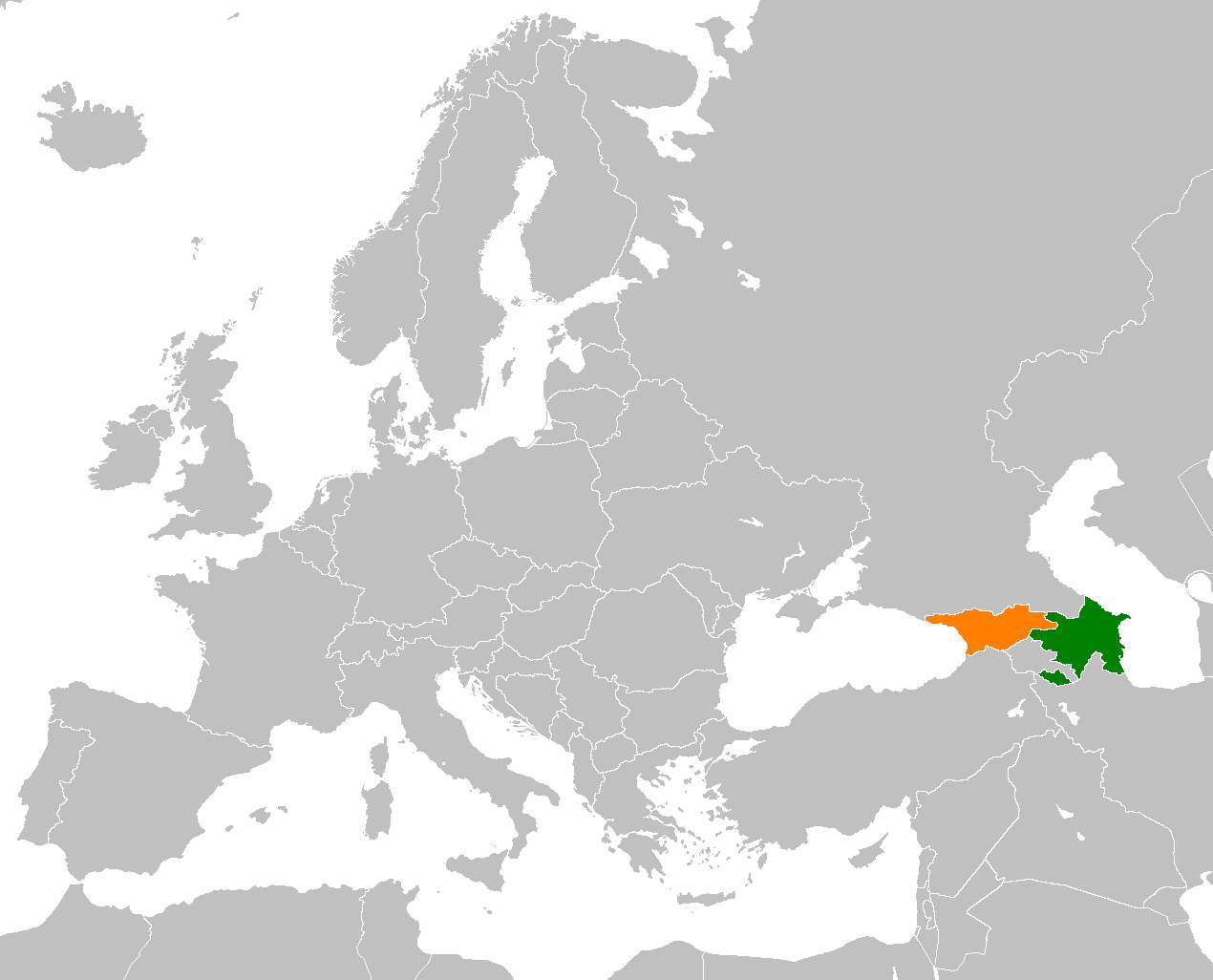

- Azerbaijan: Georgia

Diplomatic mission
- Embassy of Azerbaijan, Tbilisi: Embassy of Georgia, Baku

Foreign relations exist between Azerbaijan and Georgia, two neighboring small nations which were former Republics of the Soviet Union. Azerbaijan has an embassy in Tbilisi and Georgia has an embassy in Baku. Both countries are full members of the Council of Europe, the Organization for Security and Co-operation in Europe (OSCE) and the Organization of the Black Sea Economic Cooperation (BSEC). The two countries are among the four founding members of the GUAM Organization for Democracy and Economic Development along with Ukraine and Moldova.

Relations between the two countries are close and cordial. Former Georgian President Mikheil Saakashvili once described relations as "whoever opposes Azerbaijan or Georgia is an enemy of both our countries."

== Diaspora ==
There are 284,761 Azeris in Georgia. They are the largest minority of Georgia and constitute 6.5% of Georgia's population, mostly in Kvemo Kartli, Kakheti, Shida Kartli and Mtskheta-Mtianeti. There is also a large Azeri community in the capital city of Tbilisi. The Georgian minority in Azerbaijan is less sizable and they are known as Ingiloy.

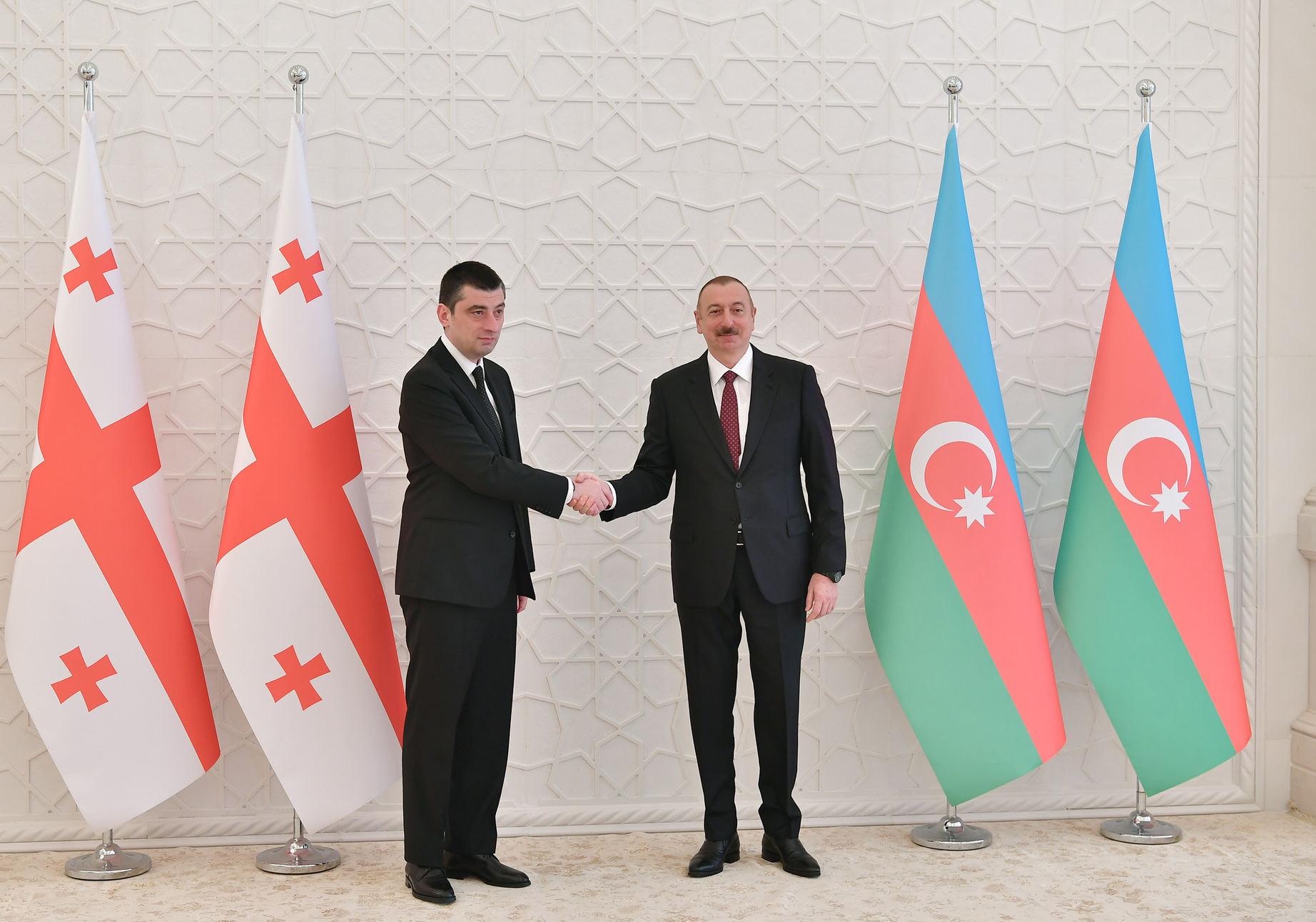
Azerbaijani President Ilham Aliyev meets Georgian Prime Minister Giorgi Gakharia in Baku, 9 October 2019

== History ==
Georgia and Azerbaijan have maintained cordial relations ever since the first establishment of their independent statehoods in 1918. On June 16, 1919, Azerbaijan Democratic Republic and Democratic Republic of Georgia signed a first defensive treaty against the White troops of General Anton Denikin's Volunteer Army, who were threatening to start an offensive on their borders. In spite of the territorial dispute over Zaqatala district and Georgia's concerns over Azerbaijan's support to the short-lived South West Caucasian Republic, the two countries maintained peaceful relations in the chaotic years of the Russian Civil War. When Azerbaijan was occupied by the Bolshevik forces in April 1920, several members of the Azerbaijani political élite moved to Georgia, which too fell to the advancing Soviets early in 1921. Both states became union republics of the USSR in 1922 and maintained good relations.

In 1991, both Azerbaijan and Georgia restored their independence and diplomatic ties were established between them on November 18, 1992. In an effort to balance regional interests, on October 10, 1997, Azerbaijan and Georgia became two of the four founding members of GUAM Organization for Democracy and Economic Development. Countries broadly cooperate in regional energy development, transportation and economic partnership projects such as Baku-Tbilisi-Ceyhan pipeline, Kars-Tbilisi-Baku railway, the TRACECA, the BSEC. Regional military and security alliance of Georgia and Azerbaijan develops along NATO's Partnership for Peace Program and the common protection of Baku-Tbilisi-Ceyhan pipeline with Turkey.

On 17 January 2025, President Ilham Aliyev of Azerbaijan held a meeting with Georgian Prime Minister Irakli Kabakhidze in Baku. This meeting took place as part of the 10th session of the Azerbaijani- Georgian Intergovernmental Economic Cooperation Commission. The discussions between the two countries focused on the overall development of various sectors. Azerbaijan had invested approximately $3.6 billion in Georgia’s economy.

== Energy ==
Georgia, under Zviad Gamsakhurdia, signed a cooperation agreement with Azerbaijan regarding the economic, scientific, technical, and cultural spheres in December 1990. In February 1993, Georgia under Shevardnadze, concluded a far-reaching treaty of friendship, cooperation, and mutual relations with Azerbaijan, including a mutual security arrangement and assurances that Georgia would not reexport Azerbaijani oil or natural gas to Armenia. In 1993, Azerbaijan attempted to pressure Georgia into joining the blockade against Armenia during the first Nagorno-Karabakh War but to no avail.

The two countries are connected by several important regional projects, including the Baku-Supsa and Baku-Tbilisi-Ceyhan oil pipelines, the "Baku-Tbilisi-Erzurum” gas line, and the Baku–Tbilisi–Kars railway. Azerbaijan is also one of the most significant trading partners of Georgia.

== Trade ==
Georgian exports to Azerbaijan include cement, locomotives and other railway vehicles, mineral and chemical fertilizers, mineral waters, strong drinks, glass and glass wares, and pharmaceuticals, among other things. Azerbaijani exports to Georgia include oil and petroleum products, natural gas, plastic wares, waste foodstuff, furniture and building constructions.

== Border ==
Despite good relations in the energy sector, the Georgian-Azerbaijani border still has yet to be clarified. Especially contentious is the Georgian David Gareja monastery complex which is divided between the two countries. Giorgi Manjgaladze, Georgia's deputy foreign minister proposed that Georgia would be willing to exchange other territory for the remainder of David Gareja because of its historical and cultural significance to the Georgians. Baku disapproves of this land swap because of David Gareja's strategic military importance. In April 2007, Azerbaijan's deputy foreign minister Khalaf Khalafov remarked that the monastery "was home to the Caucasian Albanians, who are believed to have been the earliest inhabitants of Azerbaijan." In response, Georgian foreign minister Gela Bezhuashvili stated that Khalafov's history lessons are "absolutely incomprehensible" and that "he should read up on world history."

In their recent comments, Azeri officials confirmed that Azerbaijan "is open to implementation of joint projects with Georgia for the restoration of the complex." However, official suggestions that the complex could be a "shared tourist zone" have sparked indignation from the Georgian public. Catholicos-Patriarch of All Georgia Ilia II said that "the monastery was a holy shrine that should lie entirely on Georgian soil." Georgian President Mikheil Saakashvili downplayed the dispute and said that "it can be resolved through friendly dialogue."

== Controversies ==
Although Azerbaijan and Georgia managed to build friendly relations, some controversies occasionally happen. One of the controversial situations labeled as a football scandal took place during the first leg of a UEFA Europa League qualifier between local Dinamo versus Gabala in Tbilisi on July 2, 2015 and served as a serious threat to Azerbaijan–Georgia relations and led to anger among Azerbaijani population. The worst and the most serious incident occurred during the match itself when a Georgian fan group hung out a poster with the following text “We remember Zagatala and Kakh. 1921”. The poster was taken away after efforts by UEFA officials. Right after that episode, Dinamo Tbilisi management released a statement condemning the incident and distancing itself from football hooligans. The immediate reaction to the incident came from top officials as well. “Strategic relationship with the Azerbaijani government and people is very important for Georgia. As the head of the Georgian government, I resolutely state that nobody, with such provocative actions, will be allowed to cast a shadow upon relations with Azerbaijan,” Georgian Prime Minister Irakli Garibashvili said. He also called on the country's Interior Ministry to launch an investigation into the alleged incident.

In 2019, tensions escalated between Azerbaijan and Georgia as the countries disputed ownership of the David Gareja monastery complex.

Between 2024 and 2026, extradition proceedings in Georgia concerning the Azerbaijani journalist Afgan Sadigov led to the European Court of Human Rights intravening to halt the extradition, citing concerns for Sadigov's safety in Azerbaijan. The Georgian government's decision to deport Sadigov in 2026 despite the ruling was criticised by human rights groups.

== Diplomacy ==
Republic of Azerbaijan

- Tbilisi (Embassy)
- Batumi (Consulate-General)

Republic of Georgia

- Baku (Embassy)
- Ganja (Consulate-General)

== See also ==
- Armenia–Georgia relations
- Georgia–Turkey relations
- Armenia–Turkey relations
- Azerbaijan–Turkey relations
- Armenia–Azerbaijan relations
- Georgians in Azerbaijan
- Azerbaijanis in Georgia
- Baku-Tbilisi-Ceyhan pipeline
- David Gareja monastery complex
