= Mosul, Azerbaijan =

Mosul
- Municipality
- Location within Azerbaijan Location within Shaki-Zagatala Economic Region
- Coordinates: 41°26′40″N 46°34′23″E
- Country: Azerbaijan
- Rayon: Zaqatala
- Elevation: 210 m (690 ft)

Population (2012)
  - Total: 3,009
- Time zone: UTC+4 (AZT)
  - Summer (DST): UTC+5 (AZT)

Mosul is a village and municipality in the Zaqatala Rayon of Azerbaijan. It has a population of 2,842. 80% of population is Ingiloys.
