= Zəyzid church =

Zayzid Church
- Zəyzid kilsəsi (Azerbaijani)
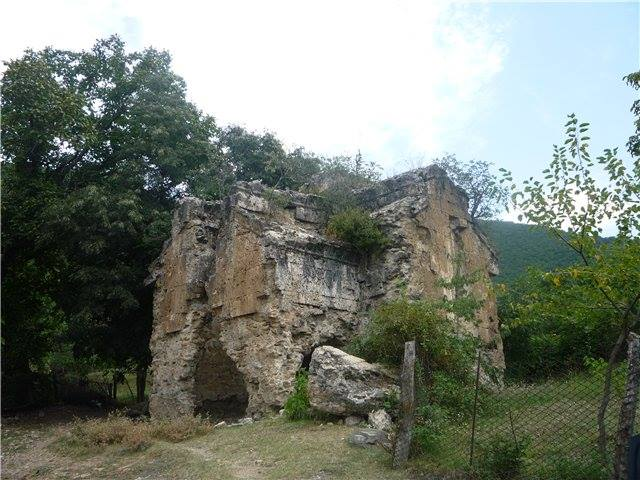

- Location within Azerbaijan
- 41°10′08″N 47°15′44″E
- Location: Orta Zəyzid
- Nearest city: Şəki

History
- Built: 10-11 centuries

Site notes
- Architectural style: Caucasian Albanian architecture
- Governing body: Azerbaijani Ministry of Culture

Zəyzid Church is a church of the 10th-11th centuries, located in the village of Orta Zəyzid, Shaki district. The building is registered by the Ministry of Culture of the Republic of Azerbaijan as a historical and architectural monument of local significance.

The Zəyzid Church exhibits a cruciform architectural plan, wherein the arms of the cross are primarily rectangular, with the exception of the eastern arm. This eastern wing is distinguished by an apse with a semicircular configuration. The junctures of the cross are accentuated by pilasters featuring rectangular capitals. Projecting semicircular arches provide support to a circular entablature. Historically, this entablature sustained a drum and dome, although these structures are no longer extant.

On the church's northern wall, two layers of cladding have survived to this day along the entire wall. Traces of ancient frescoes can be seen on the coating.

== History ==
At the beginning of our era, the active propaganda and spread of Christianity in the territory of Caucasian Albania and its transformation into a state religion from the 4th century led to the construction of a large number of churches and monasteries. The study of temple and necropolis complexes, the determination of the periods to which they belong, made it possible to trace the process of strengthening Christian ideology in the territory of the Mountainous Caucasus, including North-West Azerbaijan.

Up to 70 Christian churches and their remains have survived to this day in the rocky and hilly areas, as well as in the forests of the North-West region of Azerbaijan. These are mainly basilica architectural forms, single- or three-nave buildings.

Among the Christian churches of the region, the church located in the village of Orta Zəyzid Shaki stands out with its cruciform plan. As a result of archaeological research and the study of the design features of the building, it was established that it dates back to the 5th-8th centuries. Also, architectural and archaeological studies have shown that all parts of the church were built in the same period. Sharf's excavations and studies conducted in several places inside the church also confirmed this conclusion. During the archaeological excavations on the territory of the church, various ceramic remains were discovered, dating back to the 2nd-6th and 8th-13th centuries. G. Mamedova refers to the fact that the church has more subtle architectural forms and decorative features compared to the Gedebey Church with similar characteristics, which suggests the possibility that it was built in a later period, at the latest in the 10th century.

=== Decorative elements ===
On the church's northern wall, two layers of facing have survived to this day across the entire wall. Traces of ancient frescoes can be seen on the covering.

All of the cornice belts of the church that have survived to this day are decorated with identical complex carved patterns. Remains of decorative bas-relief and sculpture have survived to this day only along the edges of the window in the southern wing. The bas-relief covers all four sides of the window.

=== Other buildings around the church ===
In the southwestern corner of the Zəyzid Church are the ruins of a small building, presumably the priest's room. Another building with a throne is located on the northern side of the Zəyzid Church. The entrance and window of the building, presumably the church chapel (sovmaa), are on the eastern wall.

On the northwestern side of the church is another seriously damaged building. This building was destroyed to the ground.[10] Not far from the church is an early medieval Christian cemetery and tombstones.
