= Afgan Sadigov =

Azerbaijani journalist

Afgan Sadigov (Azerbaijani: Əfqan Sadıqov) is an Azerbaijani journalist and human rights activist. Having served multiple prison sentences in his native Azerbaijan due to his reporting on government embezzlement, he fled to Georgia in 2023. Between 2024 and 2026, Sadigov was the subject of extradition proceedings; shortly after the extradition request was dropped, Sadigov was deported back to Azerbaijan, where he was arrested in June 2026.

== Career ==
Sadigov worked as editor-in-chief of AzelTV, where he specialised in producing stories about the embezzlement of public funds by government officials. He frequently wrote articles about social justice, and was critical of President of Azerbaijan, Ilham Aliyev, and his government.

== Arrests and prison sentences (2016–2022) ==
In 2016, Sadigov was arrested and charged with assault. He denied the charges against him, but was sentenced to two and a half years in prison.

In May 2020, Sadigov was arrested while shopping; his home was subsequently searched. He was accused of attempting to extort money from a public figure; his lawyers stated the arrest was in response to an article he had written alleging that public officials in Sumgait had attempted to silence victims of sexual assault from local police officers.

On 3 November 2020, Sadigov was sentenced to seven years in prison. He started a hunger strike, and his lawyer launched an appeal, which saw his sentence reduced to six years. In July 2021, the Supreme Court of Azerbaijan further reduced his sentence to four years. Sadigov was released from prison on 27 May 2022 after receiving a presidential pardon. It was reported that his health had deteriorated significantly while he had been in detention following a 242 day-long hunger strike against his sentence.

During Sadigov's time in prison, he was considered a prisoner of conscience by human rights groups such as the Friedrich Naumann Foundation. The Committee to Protect Journalists called on Azerbaijani authorities to drop the "fabricated" charges against him, and to release him "immediately".

In December 2023, Sadigov and his family fled Azerbaijan, settling in Georgia.

== Extradition proceedings (2024–2026) ==
From Georgia, Sadigov continued to publish articles criticising Aliyev, as well as the Russian invasion of Ukraine in 2022. In 2024, he took part in protests that took place across Georgia following the disputed results of parliamentary elections, leading to several appearances in Georgian courts, resulting in fines.

On 3 August 2024, Sadigov was arrested by Georgian authorities following a request from Azerbaijan, which stated it was conducting a preliminary investigation into "threats and extortion". His lawyer stated that they did rule out the possibility that the charges were a "fabrication" to enable Sadigov to be extradited back to Azerbaijan; a few weeks earlier, Sadigov had been prevented by Georgian officials from travelling to Turkey, being told he could only travel to Azerbaijan. He was imprisoned pending a potential extradition, initially for three months, which was later extended. On 18 September, the Ministry of Internal Affairs declined to grant Sadigov refugee status.

On 28 November 2024, a court in Tbilisi ordered Sadigov's extradition to Azerbaijan. His wife, Sevinj Sadigova, issued a statement alleging that he would experience political persecution in Azerbaijan, stating that "[Bidzina] Ivanishvili bought the court and is carrying out Aliyev's orders". In January 2025, the decision was temporary suspended by the European Court of Human Rights, pending a final decision, due to concerns that Sadigov's rights would be violated in Azerbaijan.

Several human rights organisations, including Amnesty International, the International Press Institute and the Organisation for Security and Cooperation in Europe, called on the Georgian government to not extradite Sadigov. On the first day of the 2024 United Nations Climate Change Conference in Baku on 11 November, Sadigov's wife organised a demonstration in support of him in front of the Azerbaijani embassy in Tbilisi, alongside the ongoing Georgian protests on Rustaveli Avenue.

On 21 September 2024, Sadigov began a hunger strike in protest against his extradition, losing 40 kilograms. In October, he was hospitalised. He later refused to return to hospital, and intensified his strike in February 2025 by refusing to drink, though reversed his decision following pressure from his wife and his lawyer. On 13 February 2025, the public defender of Georgia warned of "rapid medical complications" in Sadigov's case. Sadigov ended his hunger strike after learning about the European Court of Human Rights' decision concerning his case.

On 16 April 2025, Sadigov was released on a 5000 GEL bail, a few days before his pre-extradition detention expired, though he remained subject to a travel ban.

On 1 April 2026, the Azerbaijani investigation into Sadigov was dropped; two days later, his travel ban was lifted.

== Deportation to Azerbaijan and subsequent arrest (2026) ==
During the evening of 4 April 2026, Sadigov was arrested by Georgian officials for "insulting a police officer on social media". A court hearing was held that night, which ordered his deportation to Azerbaijan, which happened on 5 April. He was banned from re-entering Georgia, despite the interim ruling from the European Court of Human Rights still being in effect. Human rights groups expressed concern that Sadigov could face further persecution in Azerbaijan.

On 8 June 2026, Sadigov was detained by several masked men in civilian clothing in Baku after the criminal case that had previously been closed against him was reopened. Following a court hearing later that day, he was ordered to be held in pre-trial detention until 30 July.

Human Rights Watch called on Azerbaijani authorities to be "immediately released" and for the "politically motivated" charges against him to be dropped.
