= Kyrion II of Georgia =

Catholicos-Patriarch of All Georgia (1917-1918)

St. Kyrion II
- His Holiness and Beatitude, the Catholicos-Patriarch of All Georgia
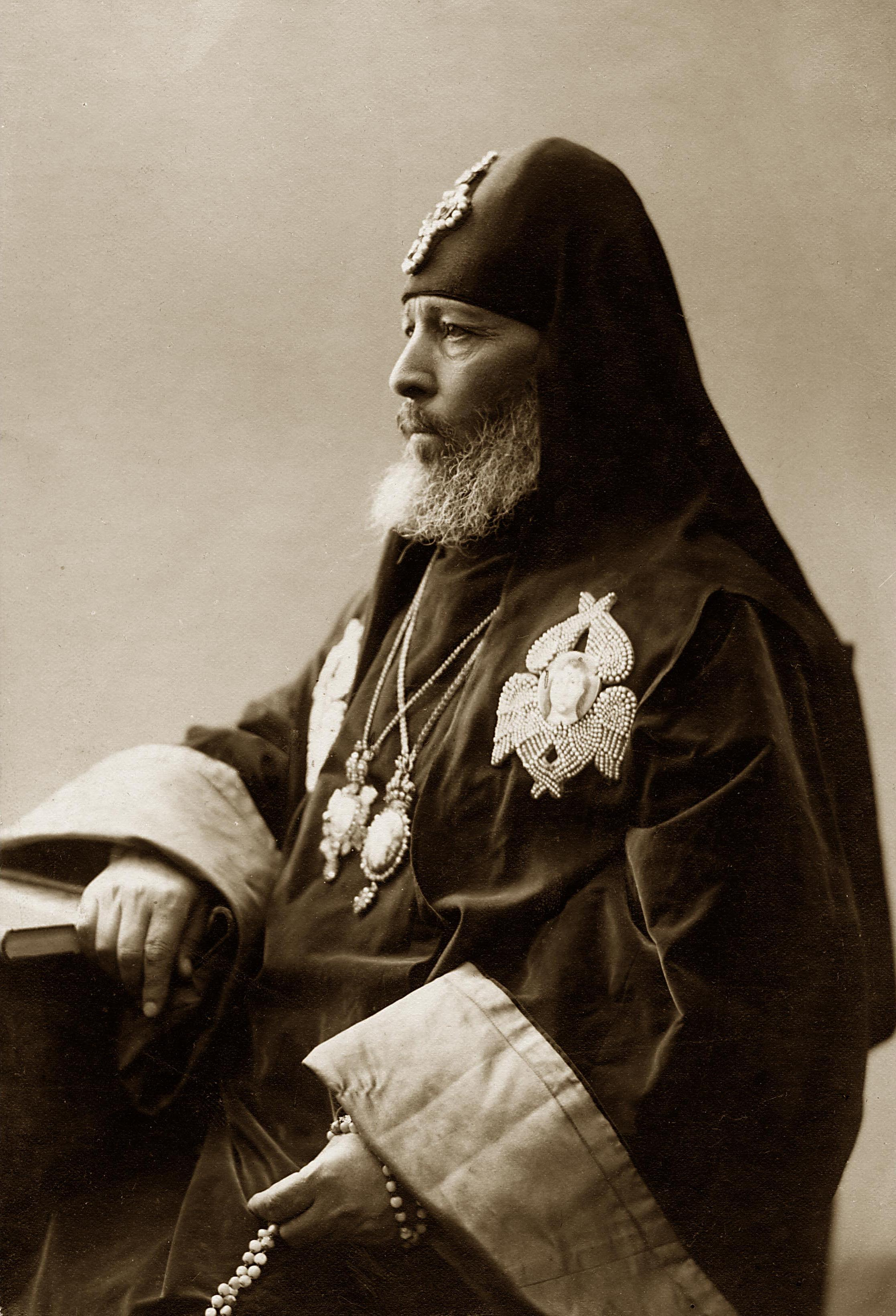
- Church: Georgian Orthodox Church
- Installed: 1 October 1917
- Term ended: 28 June 1918
- Predecessor: Anton II
- Successor: Leonide

Orders
- Ordination: 1896

Personal details
- Born: Giorgi Sadzaglishvili; 10 November 1855 Zemo Nikozi, Tiflis Governorate, Caucasus Viceroyalty, Russian Empire
- Died: 27 June 1918 (aged 62) Martkopi, Tiflis Governorate, Caucasus Viceroyalty, Russian Empire
- Denomination: Eastern Orthodox Church
- Occupation: Catholicos-Patriarch
- Profession: Theologian

St. Kyrion II (Georgian: კირიონ II) (November 10, 1855 – 26 June 1918) was a Georgian religious figure and historian who served as the first Catholicos-Patriarch of All Georgia after the restoration of independence (autocephaly) of the Georgian Orthodox Church from the Russian Orthodox Church in 1917 until his assassination in 1918. He was canonized by the Georgian Holy Synod in 2002.

== Early life and career ==
Kyrion II was born as Giorgi Sadzaglishvili (გიორგი საძაგლიშვილი) in the village of Nikozi, Georgia (then part of the Tiflis Governorate, Imperial Russia), into the family of a priest. He graduated from the seminaries of Tbilisi (1876) and Kiev (Kyiv) (1880), and was appointed a deputy inspector of the Odessa Seminary in 1880. Returning to Georgia in 1883, he served both as a teacher at the theological schools in Gori, Kutaisi and Tbilisi, and a church official. At the same time, under the pseudonyms of Sadzagelov-Iverieli, Iverieli, and Nikozeli, he published several works, in Georgian and Russian, about the history of the Georgian Orthodox Church and Christianity in Georgia. He discovered and studied several unique medieval Georgian manuscripts, collected old Georgian coins, recorded pieces of folklore, sponsored talented Georgian students, and collaborated with foreign scholars interested in Georgia.

== Church career ==
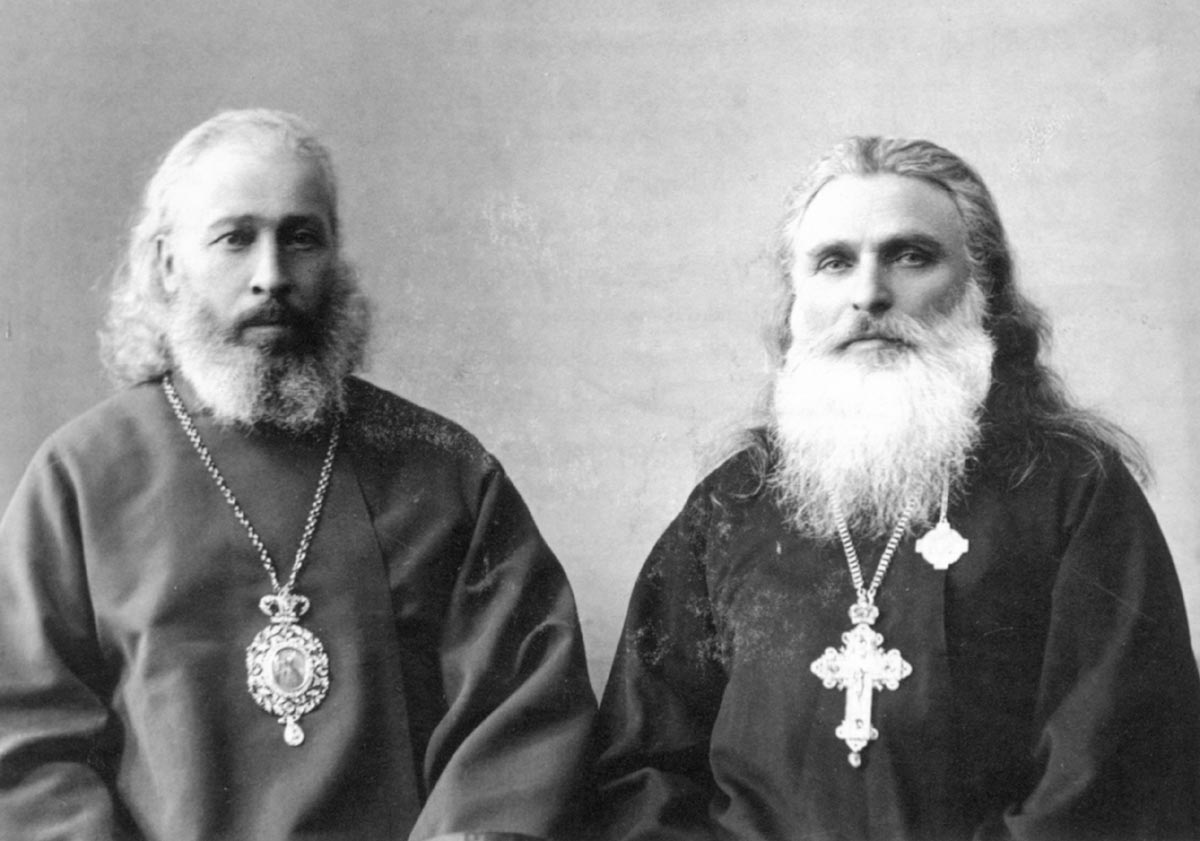
St. Ambrosius and Kyrion.

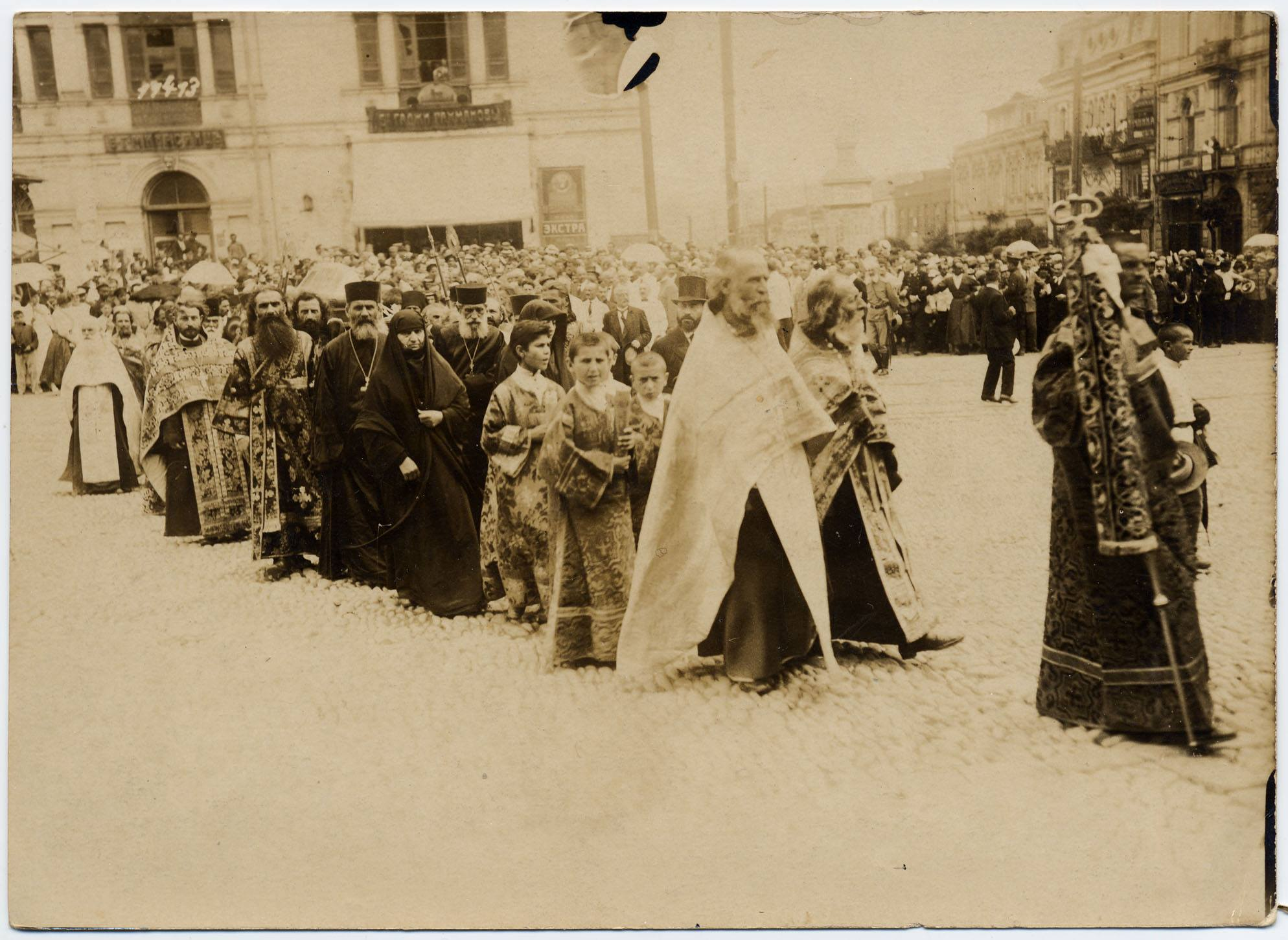
The funeral procession of Kyrion II in Tbilisi. June 28, 1918.

After the death of his wife and children, he became a monk, assumed the name of Kyrion, and was ordained to the position of archimandrite at Kvatakhevi Monastery in 1896. He served as a bishop at Alaverdi (1898–1901) and Gori (1901–2). In the early 20th century, during the heated debates concerning the status of the Georgian church, he was an active proponent of the Georgian autocephalist movement, calling for the restoration of the autocephalous Orthodox Church of Georgia abolished by Imperial Russia in 1811. For this reason, he was removed from Georgia to Kamenets-Podolsk (now Kamianets-Podilskyi, Ukraine) (1902) and later to Kovno (now Kaunas, Lithuania) (1903). During May 3, 1903, and April 23, 1904, he was a bishop of Novomyrhorod and vicar of Kherson Governorate. In 1908, the Russian Exarch of Georgia, Archbishop Nikon, was murdered in Tbilisi, and the Russian government exploited the situation as a pretext for removing Georgian bishops from their posts. Kyrion was deprived of the title of bishop, sent to Kuriazh, Ukraine, and later confined into the Sanaksar Monastery in Mordovia. In 1915, he was restored to his rank and appointed a bishop of Polotsk and Vitebsk. He was able to return to Georgia only after the 1917 February Revolution in St Petersburg led to a de facto secession of Georgia from Russia. Returning to Georgia in September 1917, he was welcomed by Georgians as their spiritual leader. By that time, Georgian clergymen had restored the autocephaly of the Georgian church (March 12, 1917), and Kyrion was elected as Catholicos Patriarch and consecrated at Svetitskhoveli Cathedral on October 1, 1917. The Most Holy Synod of the Russian Orthodox Church refused to recognize the move, and the result was a break in communion between the two churches. It was not until 1943 that the Russian Orthodox Church recognized the autocephaly of the Georgian Patriarchate and the relations between the two co-religionist churches were restored.

During his tenure, Kyrion faced opposition from a group of Georgian clerics who defied his authority. Kyrion's death remains a mystery to this day. He was found murdered at his residence at Martqopi Monastery early on June 27, 1918. He was buried at the Tbilisi Sioni Cathedral. The Holy Synod of the Georgian Orthodox Church canonized him on October 17, 2002.

Eastern Orthodox Church titles
Preceded by Russian Exarchate of Georgia	Catholicos-Patriarch of All Georgia; 1917–1918	Succeeded by Leonid
