= Leonid of Georgia =

Catholicos-Patriarch of All Georgia (1918–1921)

Leonid
- His Holiness and Beatitude, the Catholicos-Patriarch of All Georgia
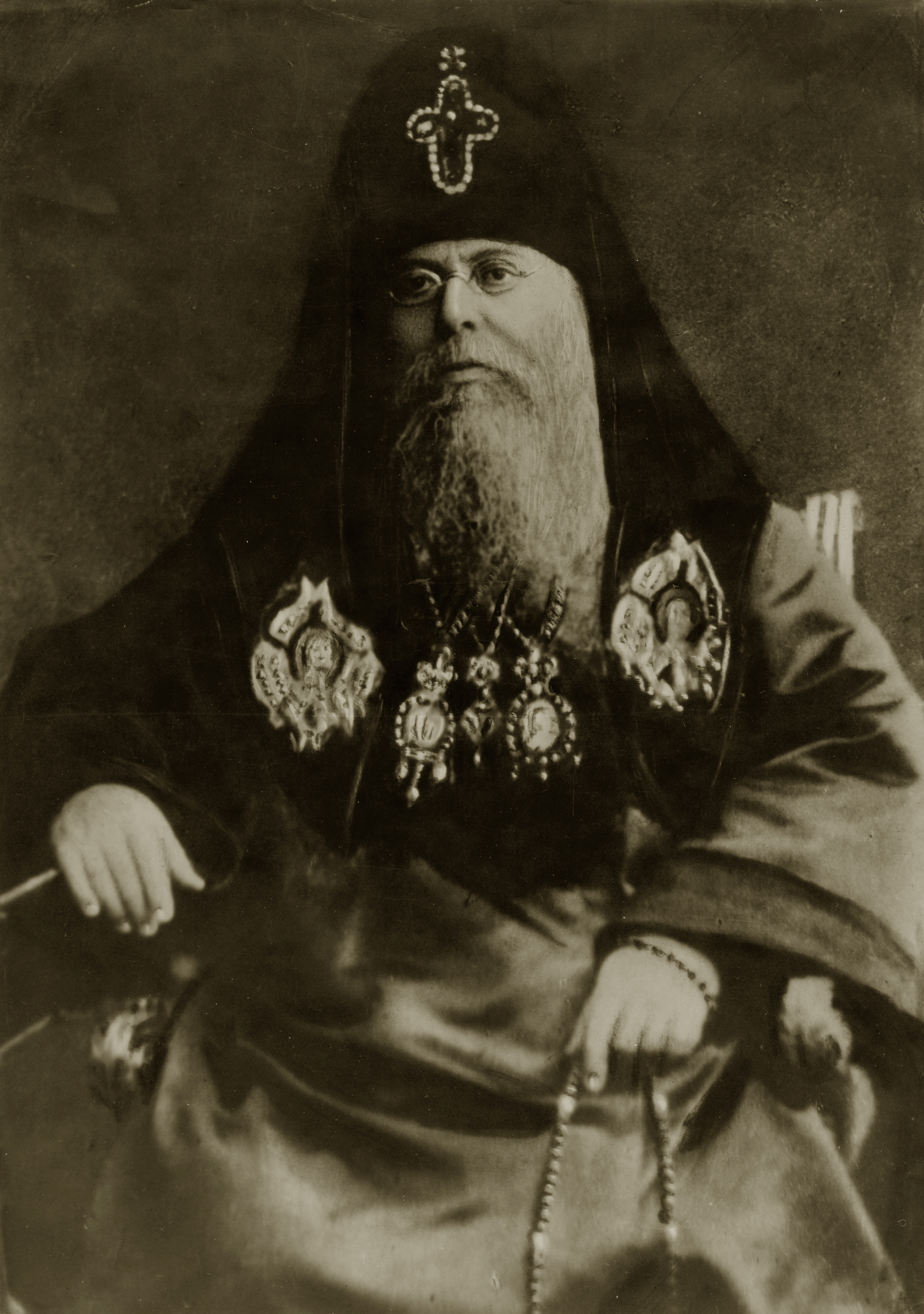
- Church: Georgian Orthodox Church
- Predecessor: Kyrion II
- Successor: Ambrose

Orders
- Ordination: 1888

Personal details
- Born: Longinoz Okropiridze; 15 February 1861 Disevi, Tiflis Governorate, Caucasus Viceroyalty, Russian Empire
- Died: 11 June 1921 (aged 60) Tbilisi, Georgian SSR, Soviet Union
- Denomination: Eastern Orthodox Church
- Occupation: Catholicos-Patriarch
- Profession: Theologian

Leonid (Leonidas) (Georgian: ლეონიდე, Leonide) (15 February 1861 – 11 June 1921) was Catholicos-Patriarch of All Georgia from 1918 to 1921, leading the Georgian Orthodox Church during the Georgian Democratic Republic.

== Biography ==
Born Longinoz Solomonis dze Okropiridze (ლონგინოზ ოქროპირიძე) in Georgia, then part of Imperial Russia, he graduated from the Theological Academy of Kyiv, Ukraine in 1888. He was later involved in missionary activities, chiefly in the Caucasus.

Ogropiridze served as an inspector of the schools operated by the Society for the Restoration of Orthodox Christianity in the Caucasus, an organization established by the Russian authorities. From the 1890s to the 1910s he served as an archimandrite of the monasteries of Zedazeni, Khirsi and of St. John the Baptist in Georgia. He also chaired the Commission for Correction of the Georgian Bible and was a member to the Georgia-Imeretia Synodal office.

Leonid was actively involved in the Georgian autocephalist movement which succeeded in the restoration of the independent Georgian church from the Russian Orthodox Church in 1917. During 1918, he functioned as a bishop of Gori, Imereti, Guria-Samegrelo and as a metropolitan of Tbilisi.

On 28 November 1918 following the murder of Kyrion II, he was elected a Catholicos-Patriarch of All Georgia. During his tenure he faced several problems such as the lack of international recognition of the Georgian autocephaly and the persecution of the Georgian church by the Bolshevik regime established by the invading Russian army in February 1921. Several months after the Russian occupation of Georgia, Leonid died on 11 June 1921, during a cholera epidemic.
