= Eparchy of Khornabuji and Hereti =

- Coat of Arms of Georgian Apostolic Autocephalous Orthodox Church

Location
- Territory: South-eastern parts of Georgia and Saingilo
- Headquarters: Khornabuji, Georgia

Information
- Denomination: Eastern Orthodox
- Sui iuris church: Georgian Orthodox Church
- Established: 2010
- Language: Georgian

Current leadership
- Bishop: Dimitri Kapanadze

Map

The Eparchy of Khornabuji and Hereti (Georgian: ხორნაბუჯისა და ჰერეთის ეპარქია) is an eparchy (diocese) of the Georgian Orthodox Church with its seat in Khornabuji, Georgia. It has jurisdiction over Dedoplistsqaro Municipality in Georgia and historical region of Saingilo, currently part of Azerbaijan.

== Heads ==
Picture	Name	Time
Georgian Orthodox Eparchy of Khornabuji and Hereti
	Melchizedek Khachidze	2009—2015
	Dimitri Kapanadze	2015—present

== See also ==
- Georgian Orthodox Church in Azerbaijan
