= Kotokli Church =

Church in Qakh District, Azerbaijan

Kotokli Church ქოთოქლოს სამების ეკლესია
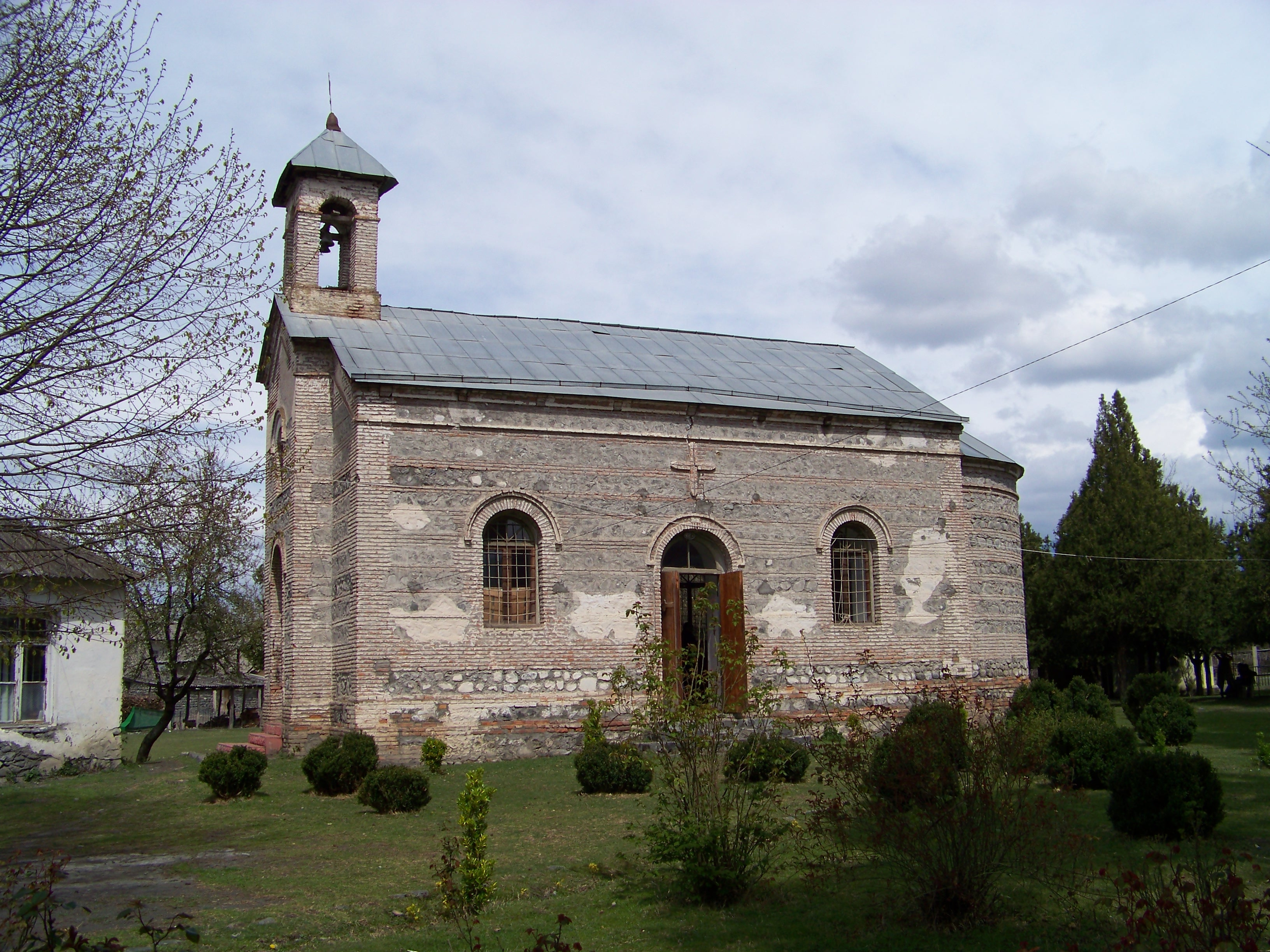

- Location within Azerbaijan

Religion
- Affiliation: Georgian Orthodox Church
- Status: Active

Location
- Location: İngiloy Kötüklü, Qakh District, Azerbaijan
- Coordinates: 41.335278°N 46.862500°E

Architecture
- Completed: c. 19th

The Kotokli Church, or Church of the Holy Trinity (Georgian: ქოთოქლოს სამების ეკლესია), is a Georgian Orthodox Church located in İngiloy Kötüklü village of Qakh District, northwestern Azerbaijan. Georgian Church leaders attended first Divine Liturgy since 1920 on 26 October 2019 in Church of the Holy Trinity.

== See also ==
- Lekarti Monastery
