= Orta Zəyzid =

- Municipality
- Location within Azerbaijan Location within Shaki-Zagatala Economic Region
- Coordinates: 41°10′00″N 47°14′21″E
- Country: Azerbaijan
- Rayon: Shaki

Population
  - Total: 4,644
- Time zone: UTC+4 (AZT)
  - Summer (DST): UTC+5 (AZT)

Orta Zəyzid (also, Orta Zəyzit and Orta-Zəyzit) is a village and municipality in the Shaki Rayon of Azerbaijan. It has a population of 4,644. A big scale modern dairy farm operates in the territory of the village, located by Shaki-Oguz Road.
