= İngiloy Kötüklü =

- Municipality
- Location within Azerbaijan Location within Shaki-Zagatala Economic Region
- Coordinates: 41°20′17″N 46°51′54″E
- Country: Azerbaijan
- Rayon: Qakh

Population
  - Total: 721
- Time zone: UTC+4 (AZT)
  - Summer (DST): UTC+5 (AZT)

İngiloy Kötüklü (also, Ingiloy Këtyuklyu) is a village and municipality in the Qakh Rayon of Azerbaijan. It has a population of 721.
