= Əlibəyli, Qakh =

Əlibəyli
- Municipality
- Location within Azerbaijan Location within Shaki-Zagatala Economic Region
- Coordinates: 41°22′41″N 46°49′19″E
- Country: Azerbaijan
- Rayon: Qakh

Population
  - Total: 1,921
- Time zone: UTC+4 (AZT)
  - Summer (DST): UTC+5 (AZT)

Əlibəyli (Georgian: ქათმისხევი – Katmiskhevi) is a village and municipality in the Qakh District of Azerbaijan. It has a population of 1,921, mainly ethnic Georgians.
