= Government of Georgia =

Government of Georgia may refer to:

- Government of Georgia (country), an executive council of government ministers in the sovereign nation of Georgia, headed by the Prime Minister
- Government of Georgia (U.S. state), the government of the state of Georgia, in the United States
