= Kurmukhi Church =

Church in Qakh district, Azerbaijan

- ქურმუხის წმინდა გიორგის ეკლესია
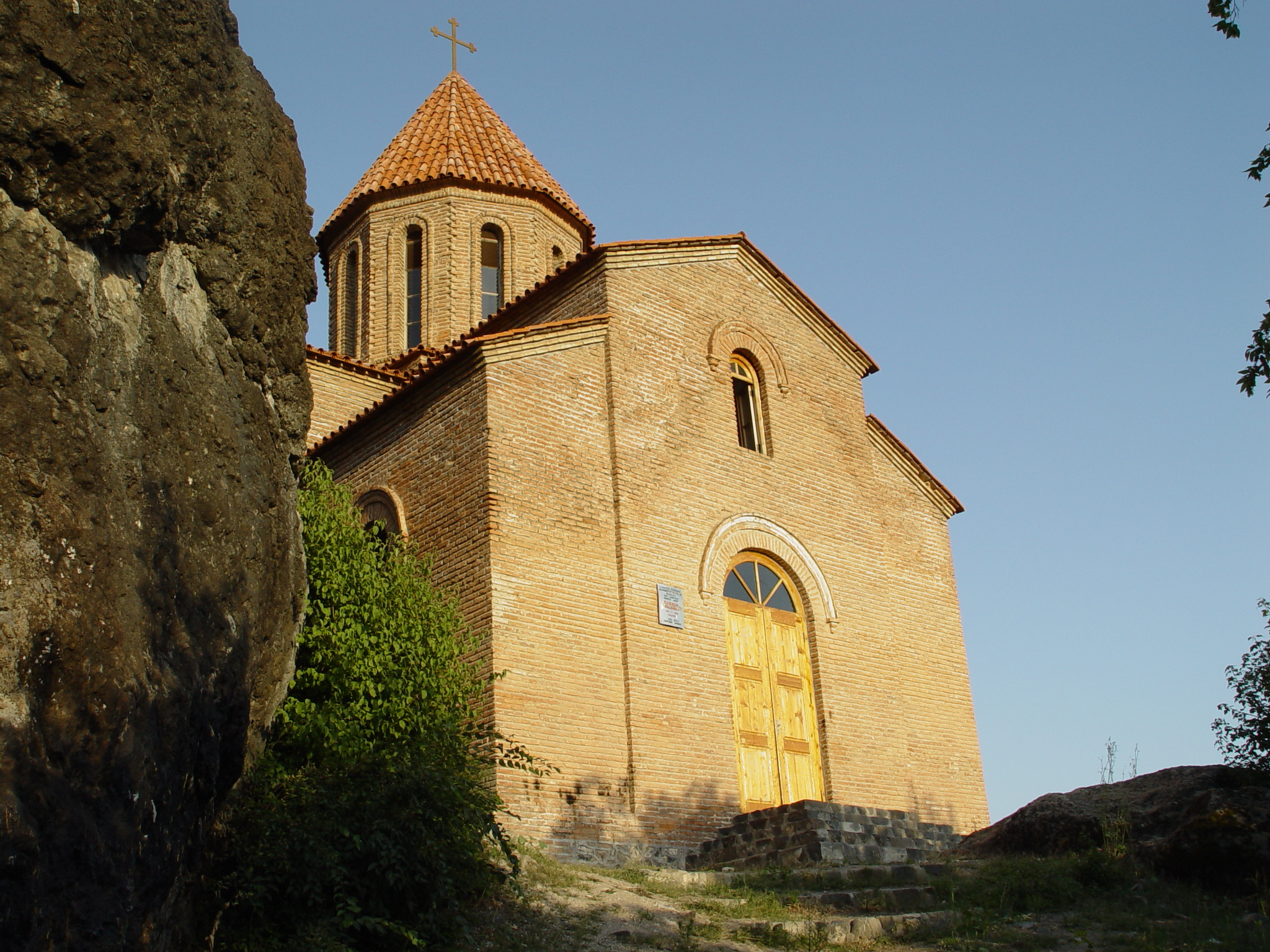

- Location within Azerbaijan

Religion
- Affiliation: Georgian Orthodox Church
- Status: Not functioning

Location
- Location: Qakh District, Azerbaijan
- Interactive map of Kurmukhi Church
- Coordinates: 41.389083°N 46.921528°E

The Kurmukhi Church of St. George (Georgian: ქურმუხის წმინდა გიორგის ეკლესია, Azerbaijani: Kürmük məbədi) is a Georgian Orthodox Church located in the Qakh District of Azerbaijan. The church is believed to be constructed in 12th century, when the Kingdom of Georgia experienced a political, economical and cultural golden age. its name is first mentioned in Georgian Gospel, which dates back to the fourteenth century, 1310, that notes it under jurisdiction of Georgian Orthodox church. The old church, however was destroyed as a result of Shah Abbas I's invasions of Georgia and was rebuilt only in 1890, by the archimandrite Leonid (then Catholicos-Patriarch of All Georgia). The monastery is currently inactive.

The Church hosts annual Christian feast of Kurmukhoba, the festival of Saint George at Kurmukhi, which is particularly interesting in that the shrine is visited by both Christians and Muslim Ingiloys.

== Gallery ==
View of the dome

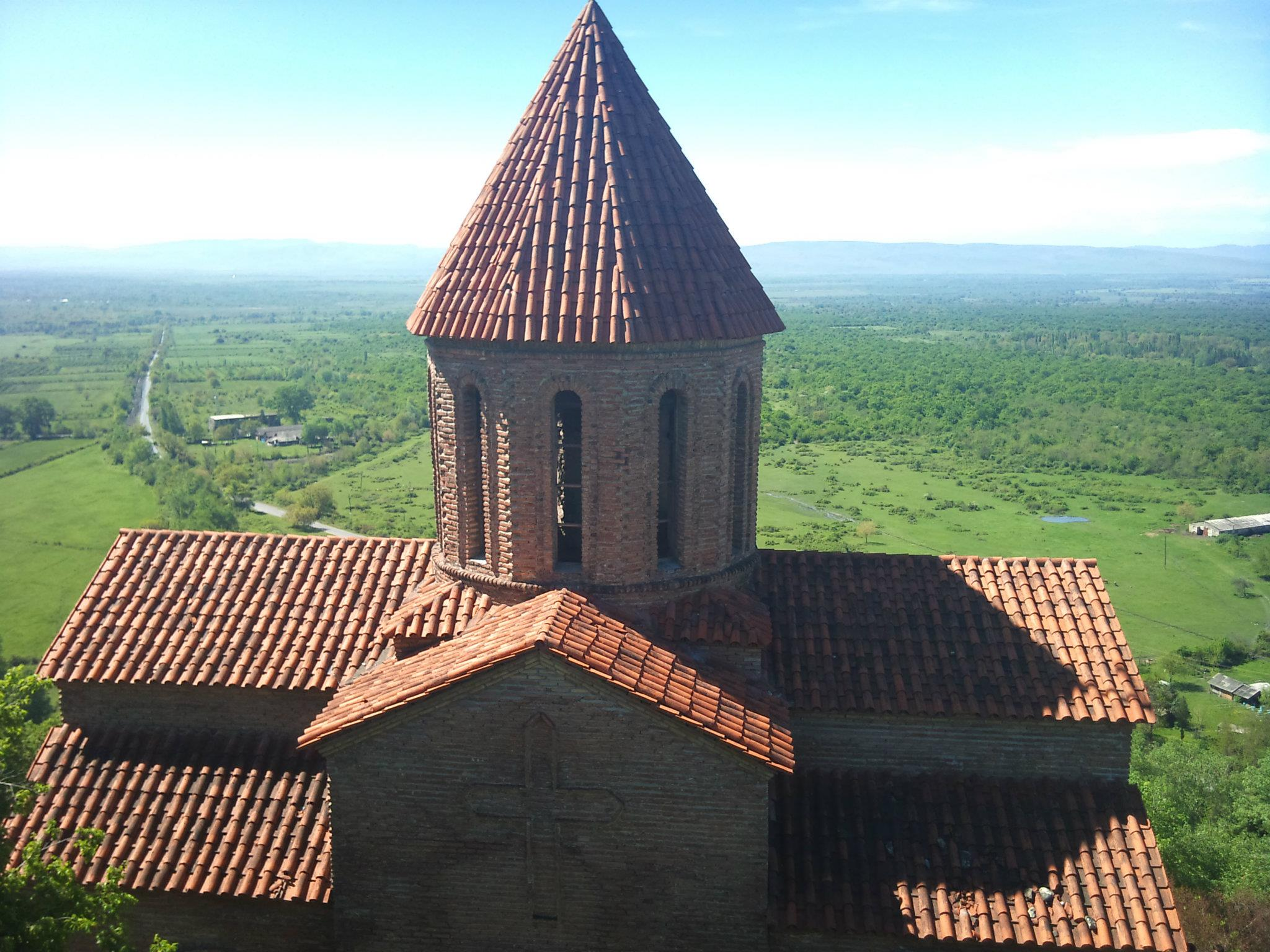
Church from the left side

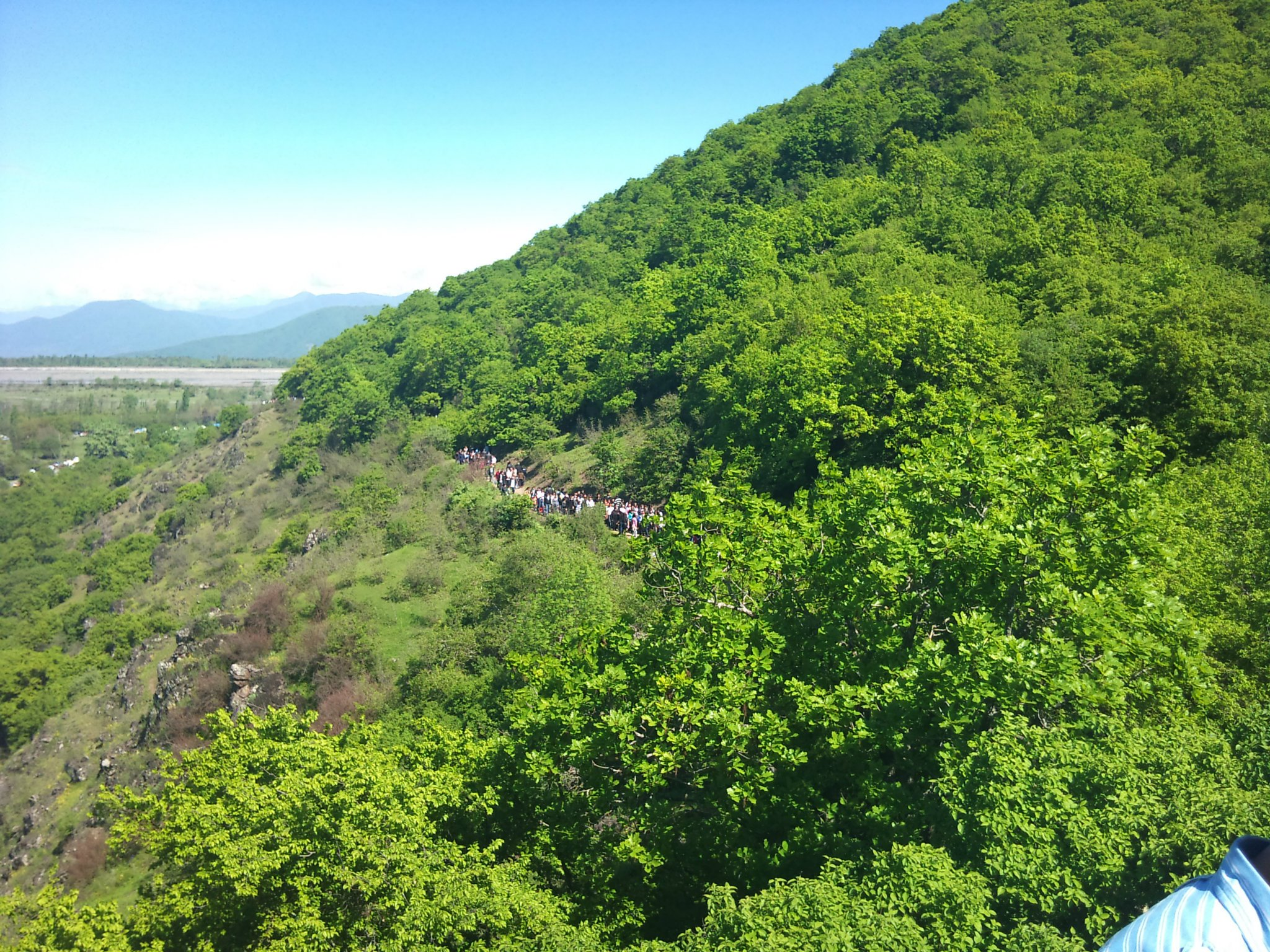
Kurmukhoba feast, processions to church

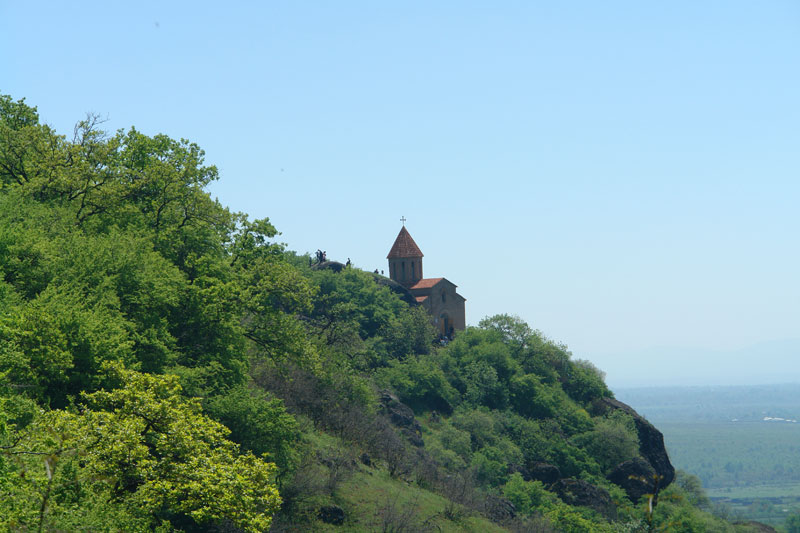
Church seen from the road leading up to it

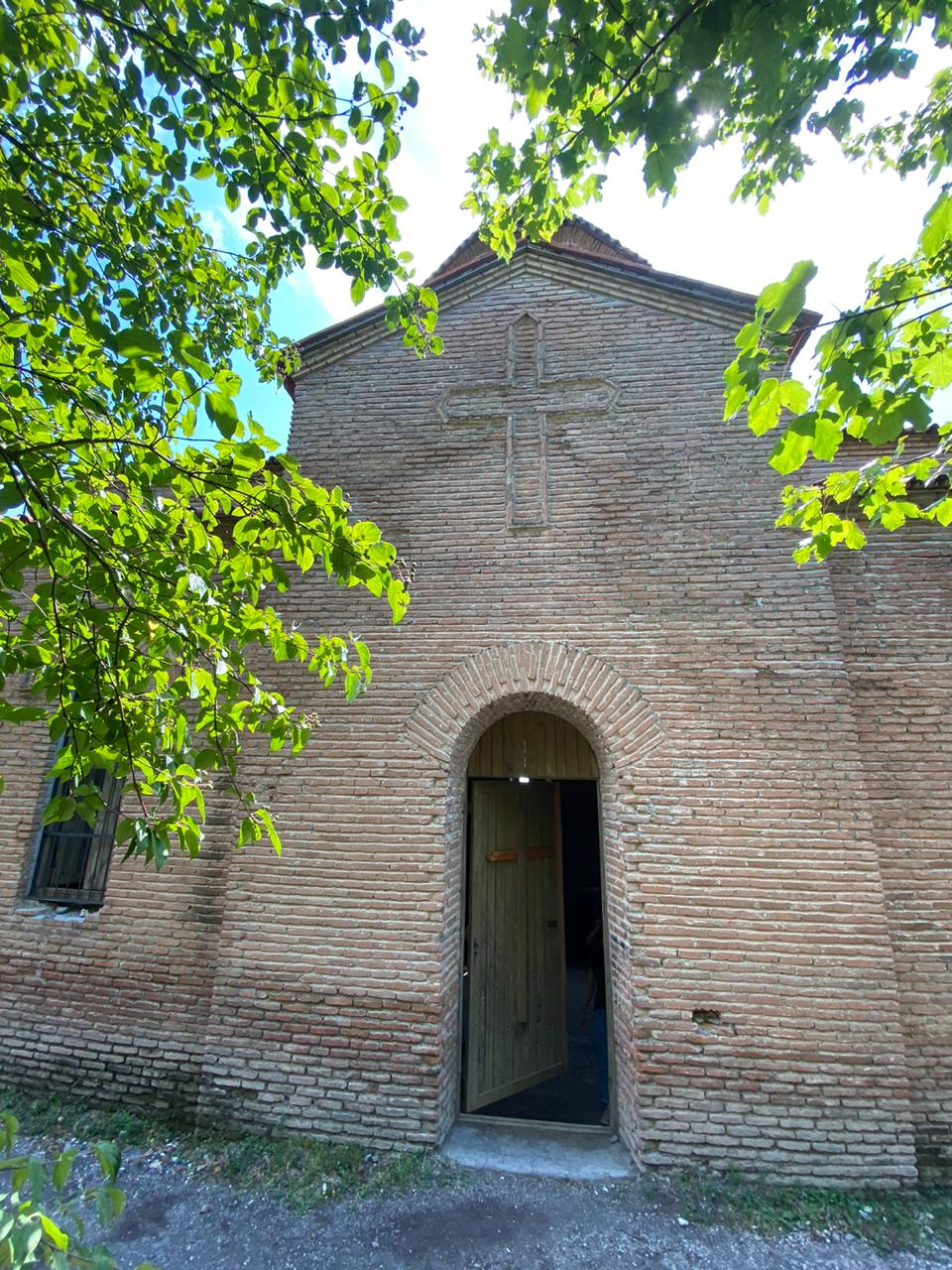
Left side of the church

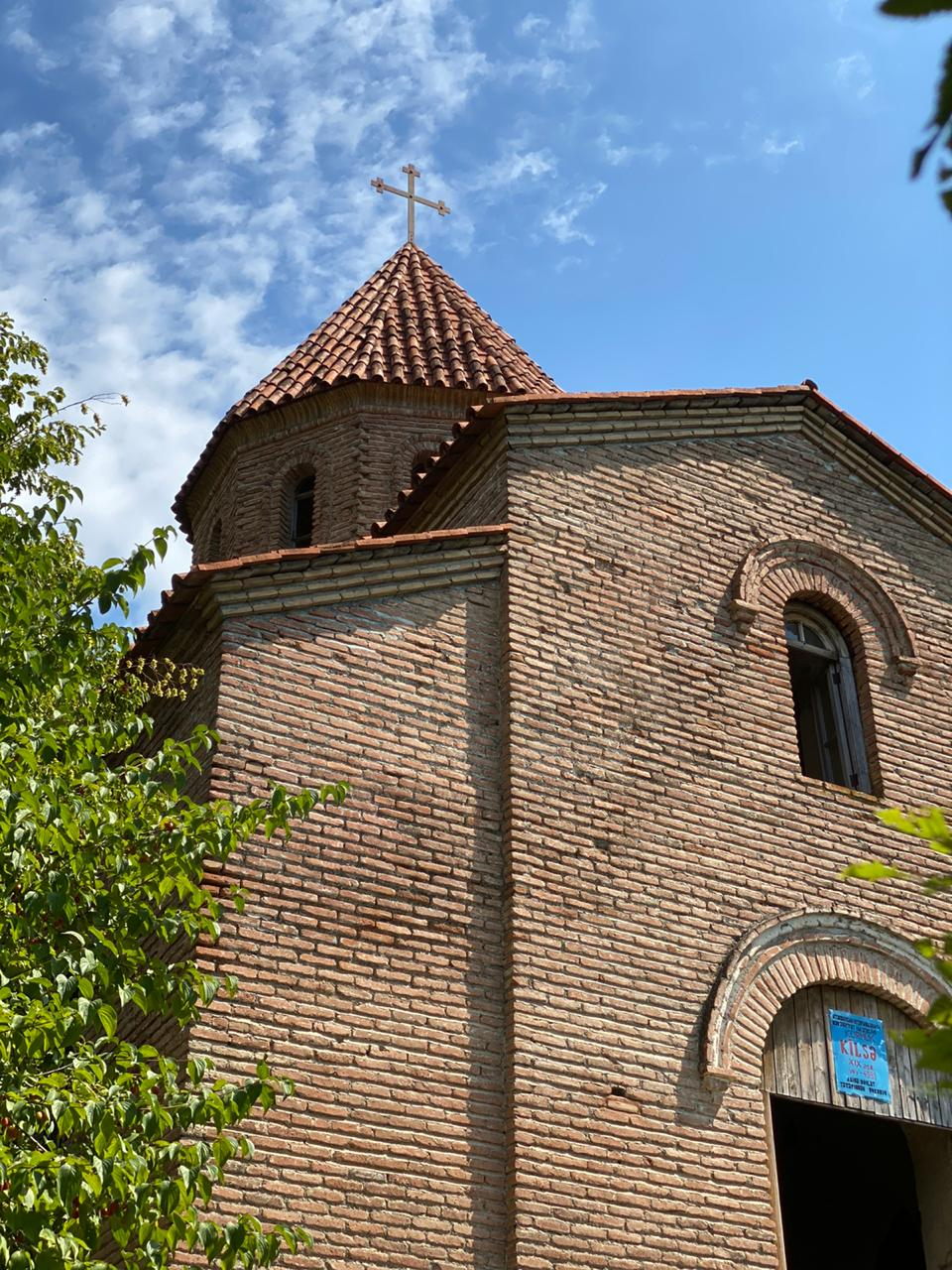
Front side of the church

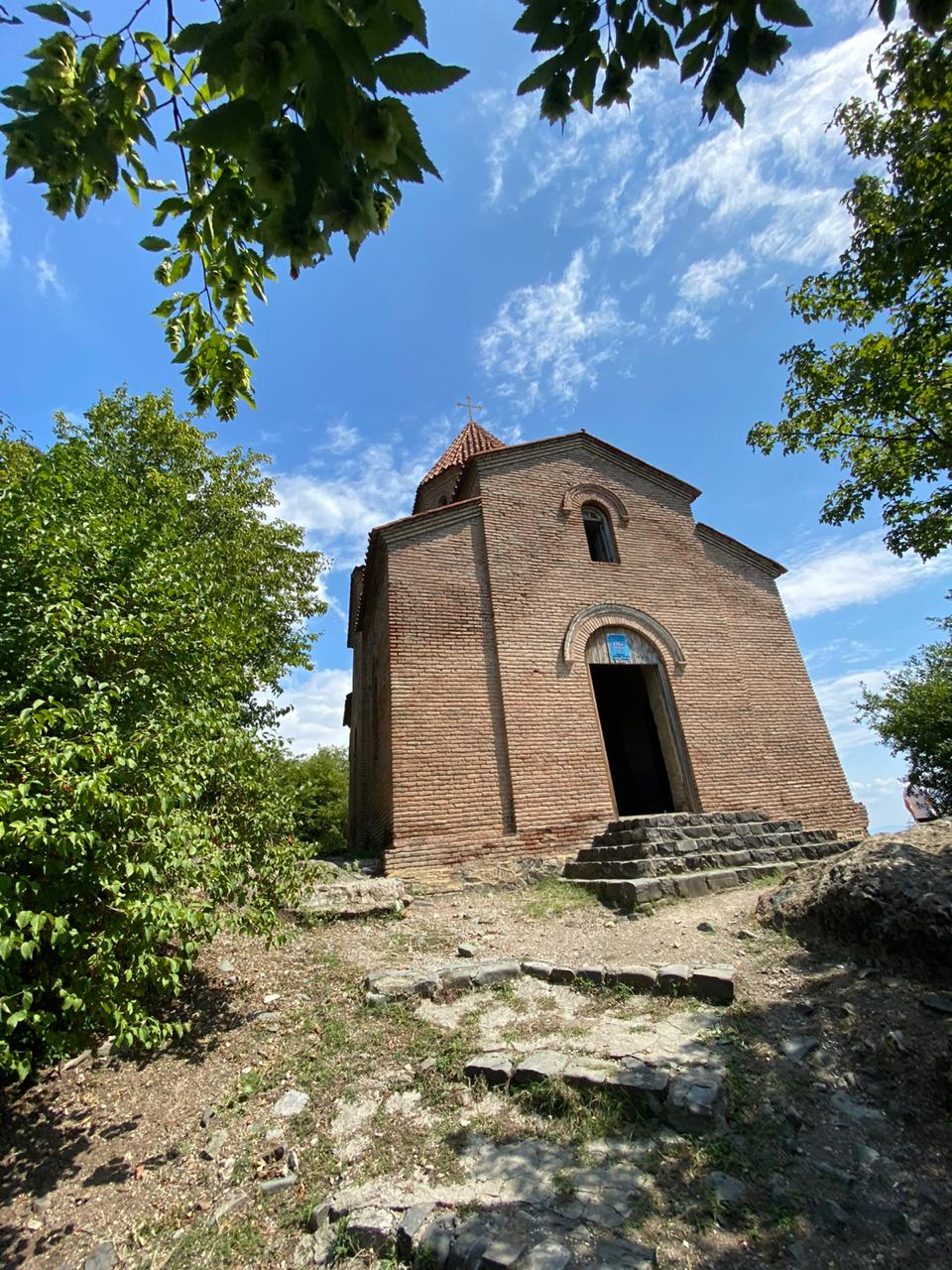
Front side of the church

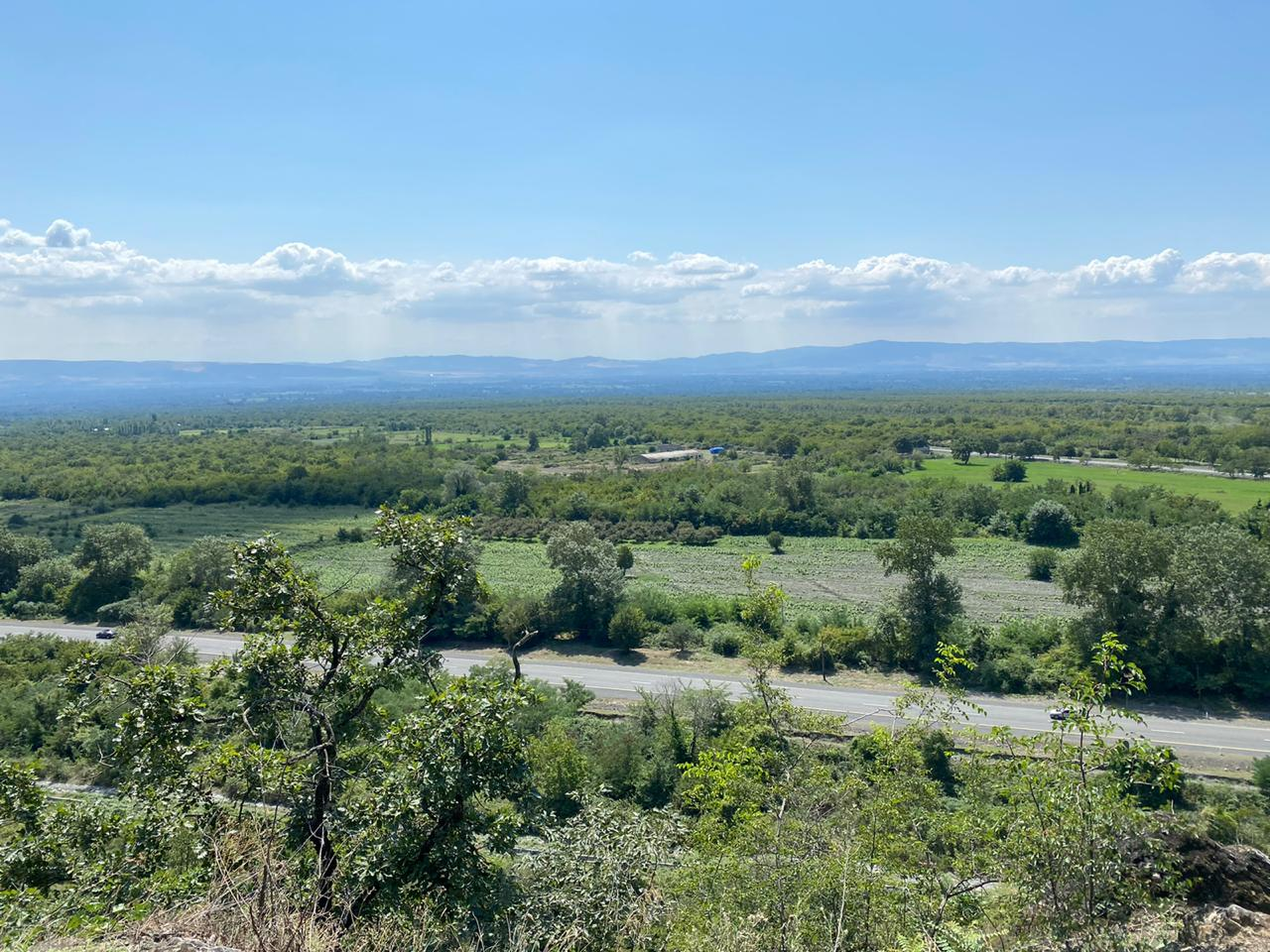
View of the below from the church

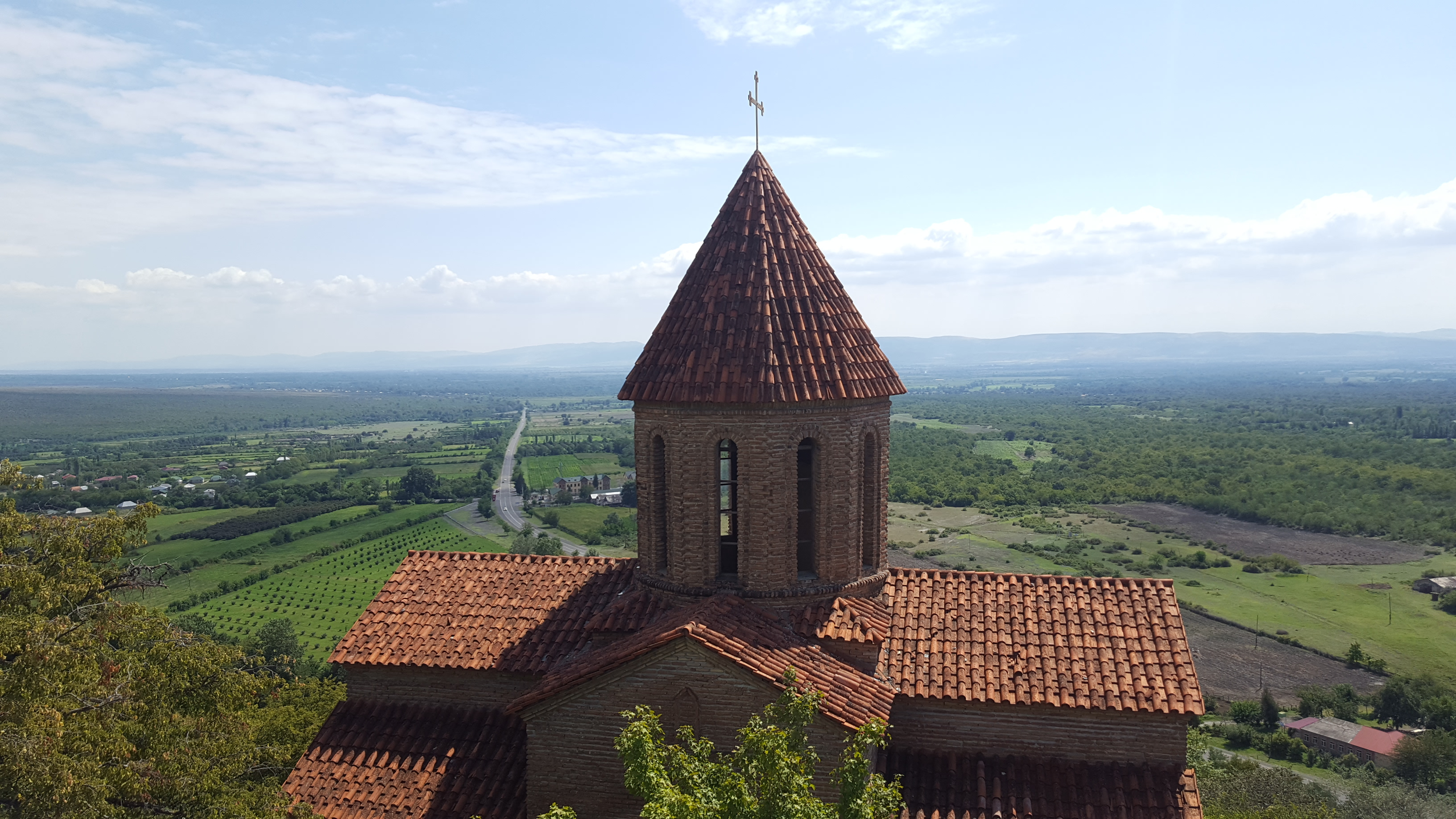

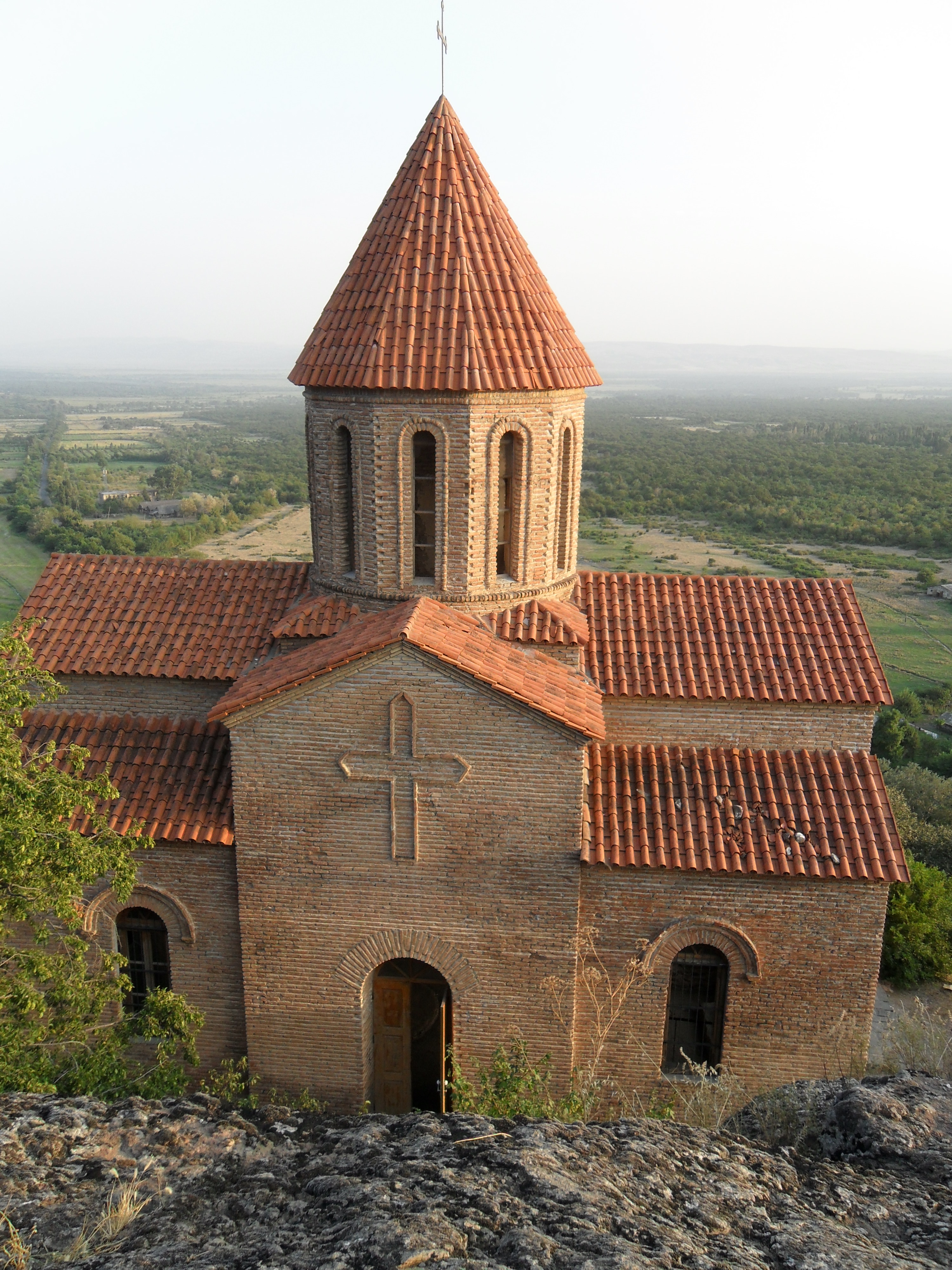

== See also ==
- Leonid of Georgia
- Church of Kish
