= Qax İngiloy =

- Municipality
- Location within Azerbaijan Location within Shaki-Zagatala Economic Region
- Coordinates: 41°25′34″N 46°56′24″E
- Country: Azerbaijan
- Rayon: Qakh

Population
  - Total: 1,792
- Time zone: UTC+4 (AZT)
  - Summer (DST): UTC+5 (AZT)

Qax İngiloy (also, Qaxingiloy, Kakh Ingilo, Kakh-Bash-Ingiloy, and Kakhingiloy) is a village and municipality in the Qakh Rayon of Azerbaijan. It has a population of 1,792.
