= Saingilo =

Saingilo საინგილო
- Cultural region
- Distribution of the Ingiloan dialect
- Country: Azerbaijan
- Largest city: Zaqatala
- Saingilo is not an official subdivision of the Azerbaijan; it constitutes a historical region only.

Saingilo (Georgian: საინგილო) is a cultural region in the Caucasus. The term was invented in the nineteenth century to designate districts of Balakan, Zaqatala and Qakh — altogether an area of 4,780 km^{2} — currently part of Azerbaijan, with an Ingiloy Georgian minority.

== History ==
Initially this territory was a province of Caucasian Albania. With decline of Caucasian Albania, the area was gradually incorporated into the Iberian kingdom forming one of its duchies (saeristavo) in the 5th century and its peoples were eventually assimilated into the Georgians proper. This was when the name Hereti first appeared in the Georgian sources. According to traditional accounts, the name of the province originated from the legendary patriarch "Heros", the son of Thargamos, who founded the city of Hereti (later known as Khoranta) at the Alazani River.

=== Medieval ===
During the Arab occupation the region was a separate kingdom within Georgian cultural and political influence. At that time, Hereti became part of the Kingdom of Kakheti. The latter was annexed to Georgian Kingdom in 1104. After the displacement, during the early medieval period, of the central government from southern Georgia (Tao-Klarjeti) to eastern Georgia, these principalities came to play an especially significant role. In the fifteenth century the term "Hereti" gradually disappeared from the political nomenclature and was replaced by the word "Kakheti," which referred to Kakheti proper plus Hereti.

In the Middle Ages seven Georgian schools operated in Saingilo which included the courses of theology, philosophy, orthography, church history, and the history of Georgia and for the students. These schools played an essential cultural and educational. They put a vital contribution in establishing cultural relations among the peoples of the Caucasus. Literary materials were prepared in the schools for diffusion in the northern Caucasus. In the thirteenth to fourteenth centuries the use of the Georgian alphabet and Georgian Christian literature spread from Saingilo to the neighboring province of Dagestan, and churches were founded there, remnants of which can be seen today. For a long time, beginning in the fifth century, a significant part of Dagestan was within the sphere of Georgian political influence.

=== Modern ===
In the early 17th century, Shah Abbas I of Safavid of Iran took these lands from the king of Kakheti and granted them to the Dagestani feudal clans who enjoyed a degree of autonomy (society Djar-Belakan, the sultanate of Elisu). Northern Caucasian mountaineers established there Avarian (in the Ch'ar-Belakan District) and Tsakhurian "free communes." As a result of raids (Lekianoba) conducted by bands of Avar and Tsakhur warriors in Saingilo, the Ingilos became serfs of the Dagestanian rulers, who forced them to make pay tribute. Some Dagestanian families hired themselves out as temporary workers on Ingilo farms. In this way, gradually, by peaceful or hostile means, these tribes settled in Saingilo and colonized it. Already after the foundation of the sultanate of Elisu the conquerors had, by a concerted effort, undertaken the Islamization of the region. After 1801, when the Kingdom of Kartli-Kakheti (eastern Georgia) became part of the Russian Empire the region ended up in the Imperial Russian conquest in 1803. After dissolving Sultanate of İlisu, it was initially part of Jaro-Belokany region, latterly became Zakatal Okrug in Tiflis Governorate.

From 1918 to 1920 both Democratic Republic of Georgia (DRG) and Azerbaijan Democratic Republic (ADR) claimed its territory as theirs, but the dispute never led to an armed confrontation. On 26 June 1918, the National Council of the Zakataly Okrug issued a statement whereby "for cultural, economic and religious reasons [...] joining the Republic of Azerbaijan is the most appropriate solution for the Zakatala Okrug". Zakatala was represented in the Parliament of Azerbaijan by three members. After the fall of the ADR in 1920 and its Sovietisation, Soviet Russia recognized Zakatala as part of Georgia (whose government granted these lands a degree of internal autonomy) "in exchange for the Georgian government legalising the activity of the Communist Party of Georgia", according to Kvashonkin. Following the Sovietization of Georgia in 1921, the area became again officially part of Azerbaijan by a decree issued by the central communist government in Moscow in 1922. Nowadays there are Georgians — Ingiloy people (Georgian: ინგილოები/ჰერები; Azerbaijani: Ingiloylar) — living in this region of Azerbaijan (districts of Qax, Balakan and Zaqatala). Ingiloys (more than 11,000 as of 1999) are an ethnographic group of Georgian people. Most of the Ingiloys residing in Qakh district remain Christians at present, those living in Balakan and Zaqatala are mostly Muslim.

== Demography ==
According to census held in 1897, the population of the region was 84,224. The ethnic makeup of the district was the following:

- Avars — 31,670 (36.9%)
- Azerbaijani (Note: "Further consolidation of different Turkic speaking tribes (commonly known as Caucasian Tatars) led to the formation of the Azerbaijani community.") — 28,950 (29.4%)
- Georgians — 12,389 (16.6%)

As of the census of 2009, the population of the region was 261,314. The ethnic makeup of the district was the following:

- Azerbaijanis — 128,007 (48.98%)
- Avars — 37,043 (14.17%)
- Georgians — 7,506 (2.87%)

== See also ==
- History of Georgia
- Caucasian Albania
