= Patara Alaverdi =

Georgian Orthodox Church in Qax, Azerbaijan

Patara Alaverdi პატარა ალავერდი
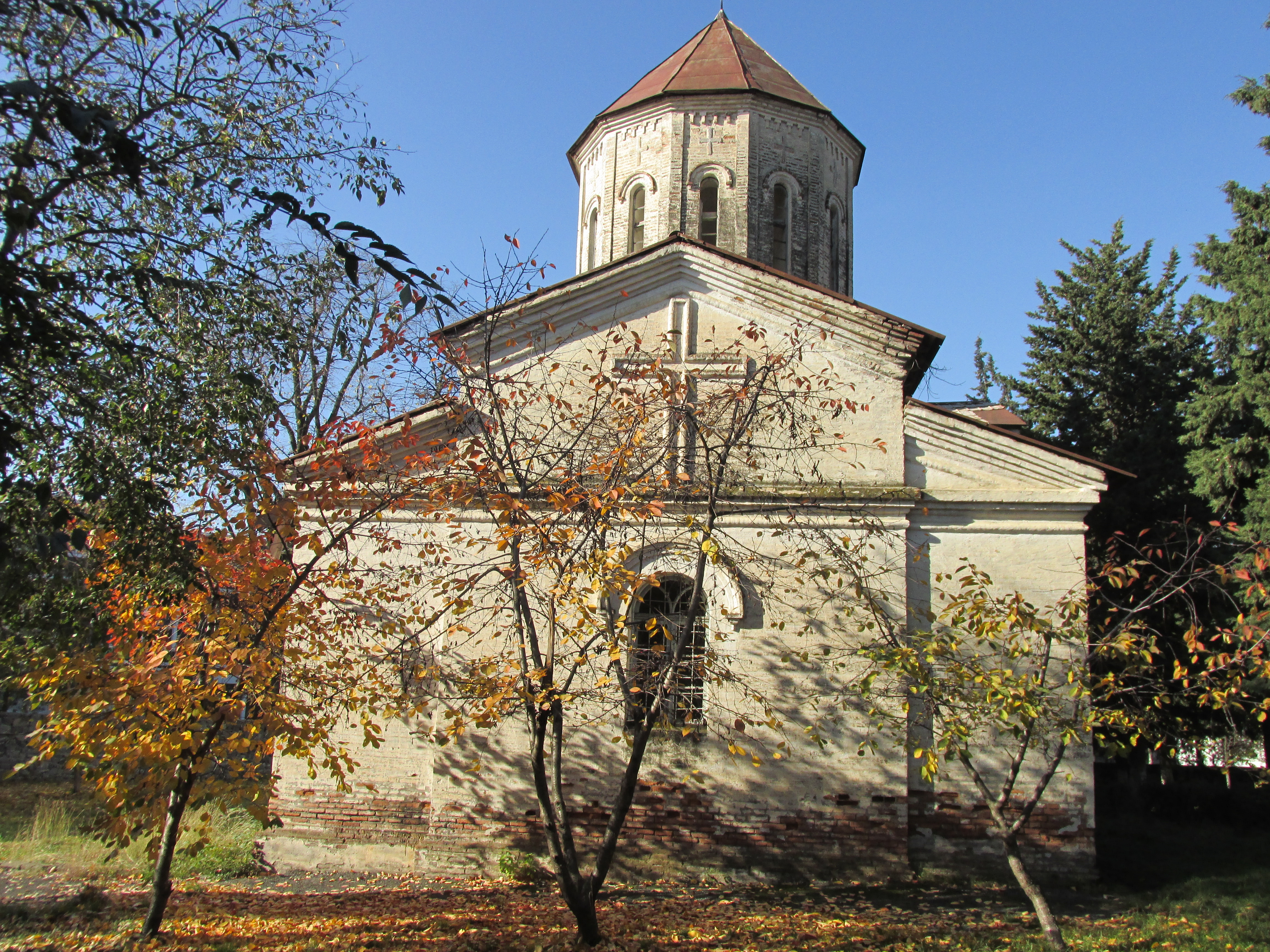

- Location within Azerbaijan

Religion
- Affiliation: Georgian Orthodox Church
- Status: Active

Location
- Location: Qakh District, Azerbaijan
- Interactive map of Patara Alaverdi პატარა ალავერდი
- Coordinates: 41.420556°N 46.917222°E

Patara Alaverdi (Georgian: პატარა ალავერდი; Minor Alaverdi) is a Georgian Orthodox Church located in Qakh District, northwestern Azerbaijan, on the border with Georgia. Patara Alaverdi is a domed church erected on the site of an old basilica with the contribution of the local community in 1888. Tradition has it that Minor Alaverdi is "a brother to Alaverdi Monastery of Kakheti". At present, the dome is damaged and in need of restoration.

Each year on 14 September, it hosts Alaverdoba, a feast with traditions identical with that of Kakhetian Alaverdi.

== See also ==
- Georgia–Azerbaijan relations
- Christianity in Azerbaijan

== Sources ==
- პატარა ალავერდი
