= St George's Church, Qakh =

Georgian Orthodox Church in Qakh district, Azerbaijan

St George's Church კახის წმინდა გიორგის ეკლესია
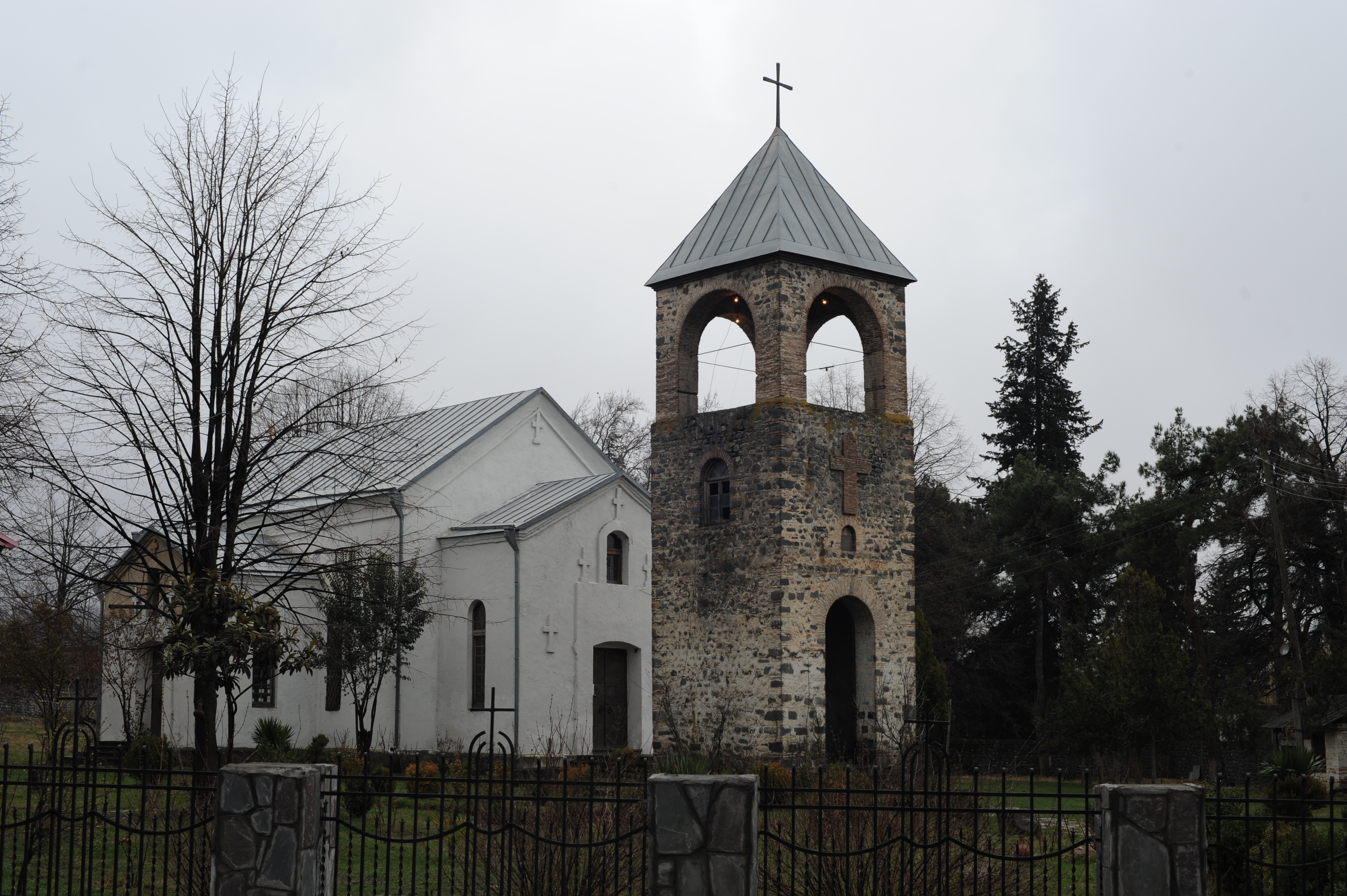

- Location within Azerbaijan

Religion
- Affiliation: Georgian Orthodox Church
- Status: Active

Location
- Location: Qakh District, Azerbaijan
- Interactive map of St George's Church კახის წმინდა გიორგის ეკლესია
- Coordinates: 41.425650°N 46.943497°E

The St George's Church (Georgian: კახის წმინდა გიორგის ეკლესია) is a Georgian Orthodox Church located in the village of Gakh-Inguila in the Qakh district, 30 metres away from the left bank of the Kakistskali river, northwestern Azerbaijan, on the border with Georgia, where the Ingiloy Georgians live compactly (about 7,500 people). The church was destroyed as a result of Shah Abbas I's invasions of Georgia, but later was reconstructed on the site of an old church in the first half of the 18th century. Its latest renovation by Ivan-Baba Belughashvili dates from the late 19th century. Currently, it is the only active Georgian Orthodox church in Azerbaijan.

== See also ==
- Kurmukhi Church
- Church of Kish
