= Galacha =

19th-century tower in Azerbaijan

- Azerbaijani: Qalaça
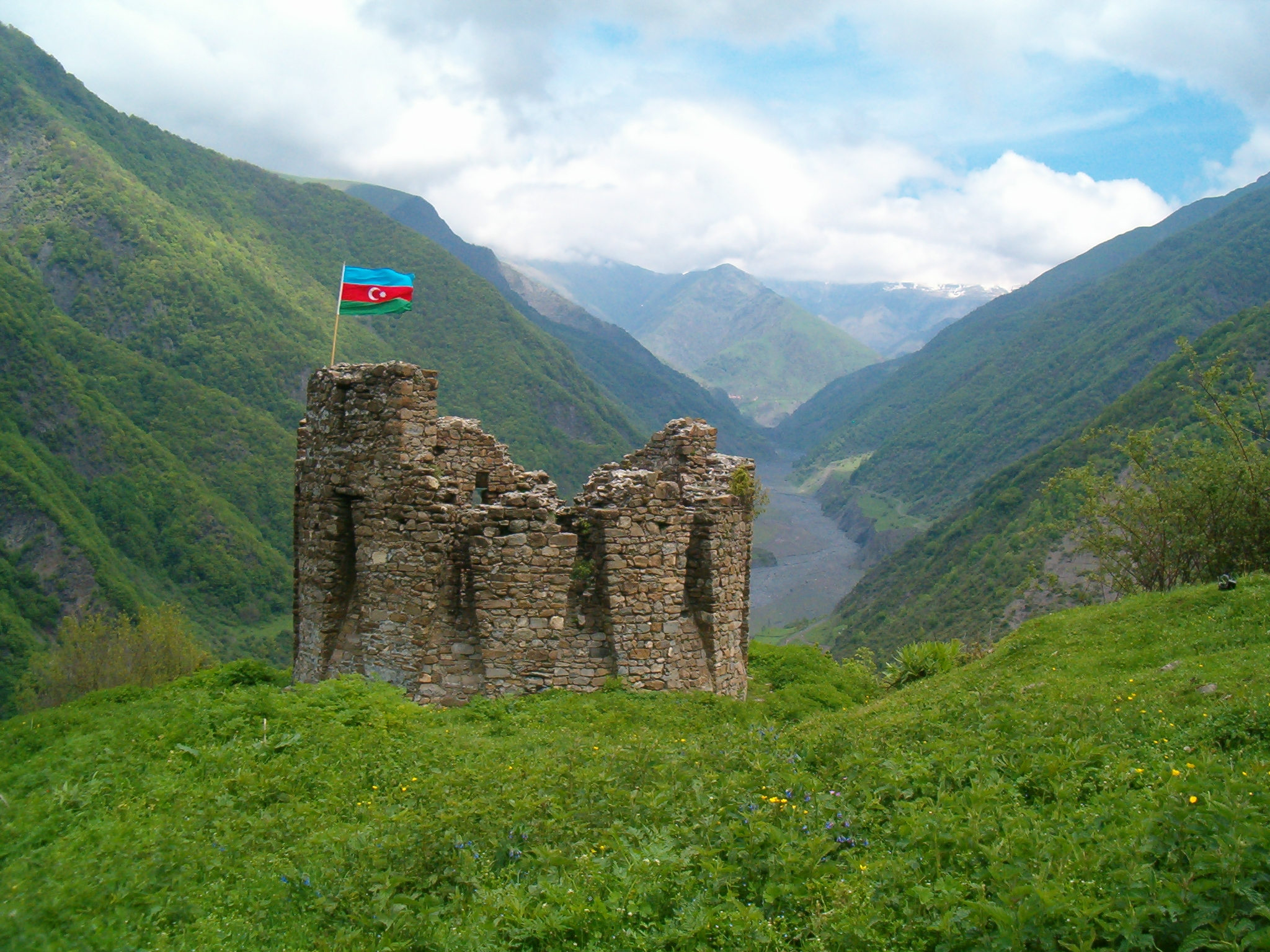
- 41°27′56″N 47°03′21″E
- Location: Azerbaijan, Qax, İlisu
- Completion date: 19th century

Galacha (Azerbaijani: Qalaça) or Shamil-Gala (Azerbaijani: Şamil-Qala) is a round tower located near the village of İlisu in the Gakh region of Azerbaijan. The tower was built in the beginning of the 19th century during the Russian troops advancing into the mountains. According to the order of the Cabinet of Ministers of the Republic of Azerbaijan on the historical and cultural monument, it is considered an architectural monument of local importance.

== History of construction ==
By the beginning of the 19th century, the Ilisu sultans were dissatisfied with the power of the Jar people and sought to interrupt their vassalage of the Jar. In this regard, the ruler of the Ilisu Sultanate, Ahmed Khan, wanted to bring Russian troops into his possession and build a fortress. During this period, on the territory of the sultanate were built a tower, called by the local population Galacha, as well as two large Russian fortresses.

As a result, the Russians supported the Sultan, thereby strengthening his power, which was gainful as opposed to the Jar community.

== Architecture and layout ==
The tower is located on Mount Ezlidag, on a mountain ridge, from which both the village of Ilisu and the whole region are overlooked. Good visibility of the vast area suggests that the tower served as an observation post. The convenient location on the ground made the tower covered by nature itself, which, in turn, made it practically impregnable.

On plan, the tower is round with a diameter of 9.2 m. It consists of two tiers and has rifle and cannon embrasures designed for shooting with a strong downward slope, which made it possible to fire on the steep mountain slopes on the approaches to the tower. During the construction of the tower, the great experience of military engineers of the Russian army was used.

The outer perimeter of the tower in the first tier is divided into 24 parts. One of these parts is occupied by an entrance opening of 1.55 m wide. From the eastern side, a steep road of 2–3 m wide leads into this opening at a constant slope. The embrasures are located at a height of 1.30 m from the ground and are directed perpendicular to the planes of the facades. Parts of the walls with embrasures have a large slope inside the fortress, due to which loopholes are formed at the level of the bypass platform of the second tier, designed for standing fire.

== See also ==
- Ulu mosque
- Sumug-gala
- Icheri Bazar

== Literature ==
- V.Muradov (1980). Неисследованные памятники архитектуры сел. Илису Кахского района Азербайджанского ССР / The unexplored architectural monuments of the Ilisu villages of the Kakh region of the Azerbaijan SSR. Baku.
