= Jinli Castle =

Fortress near Ilisu, Gakh region of Azerbaijan

- Azerbaijani: Cinli qala
- Azerbaijan, Qax, İlisu
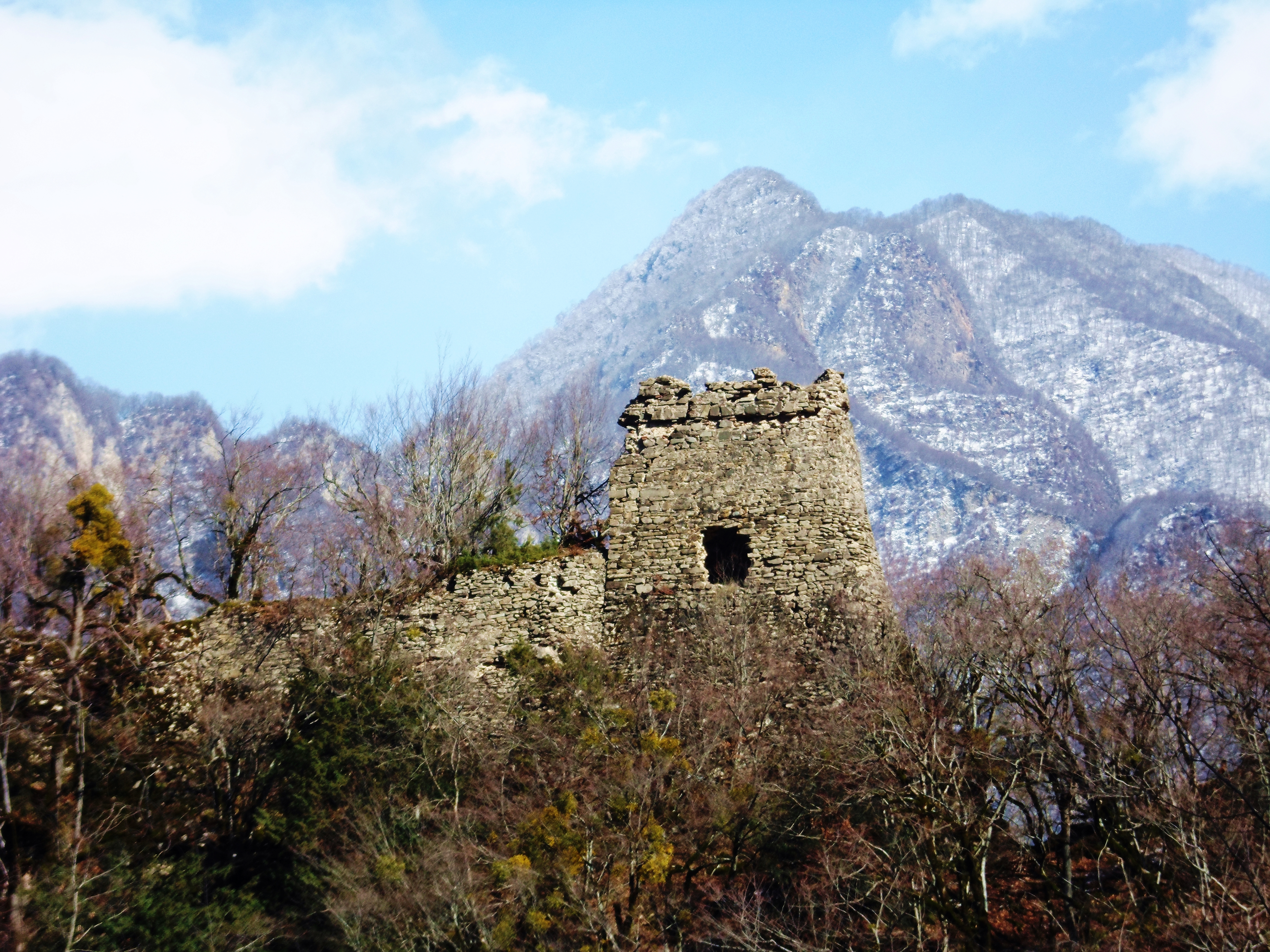

Site information
- Type: Castle

Location
- Coordinates: 41°30′N 47°00′E

Site history
- Built: according to various sources 7-9 centuries, or the 18th century

Jinli Castle or Jinli-Gala (Azerbaijani: Cinli qala) is a fortress located near the village of İlisu in the Gakh region of Azerbaijan. It was built according to some sources in the 7-9th centuries, according to others - presumably in the 18th century, during the time of continuous invasions and internal conflicts. It is also possible that the fortress was used in the beginning of the 19th century, during the clashes between the Russians and the mountain population. According to the order of the Cabinet of Ministers of the Republic of Azerbaijan on historical and cultural monuments, it constitutes an architectural monument of local importance.

== Fortress location ==
The fortress represents a defensive structure of mountain fortresses type. It is located on the left bank of the Kurmukhchay river on the Gakh - Ilisu road, to the right of the highway leading to Ilisu, 5 kilometers from the village, on the top of a cliff. Near the fortress there is a gorge, popularly known as the “Fortress Gorge” (Azerbaijani: Qala dərəsi)

The site for the construction of the fortress was chosen taking into account the best security options and the ability to control a significant territory - from the village of Kakhbash to the Ulu-Kerpyu bridge. A fortress was built on the top of one of the spurs of the ridge stretched along the Kurmukhchay River. The structure is protected by natural barriers: a river, a cliff and hard-to-reach slopes. The area of the fortress is small and bounded on three sides by steep slopes. The northern side has the greatest steepness, which makes the fortress difficult to reach during an attack.

== Fortress architecture ==
On the plan, the fortress is a highly elongated irregular rectangle along the long east–west axis and measures 12 by 60 meters, which is due to the relief of the territory. The volumetric-spatial composition of the fortress, based on the alternation of towers and scaffolds along its entire perimeter, is due to the natural topographic conditions and defense requirements.

On the defensive walls of the fortress there are 13 towers tapering upwards. The walls and towers of the southern facade, with the exception of a small area, have a large slope into the fortress. This slope is made so the stones thrown from above to ricochet off the wall and hit the besiegers. This technique compensated the lack of strategic capabilities of the most vulnerable part of the fortress. From the outside, the height of the walls of the fortress in some areas exceeds 7 meters. The thickness along the entire perimeter ranges between 60 and 120 centimeters, which is due to the strategic capabilities of the area: the higher the site, the thinner the walls were built.

On the highest point of the fortress’ territory, on the top of the cliff, there is located the main quadrangular tower about 10 meters high, on the northern and southern walls of which there are secret openings for observation. On the second tier of the tower, which served both as housing and as a sentry post, there is a window opening.

Inside the fortress walls, there are the remains of various buildings, in the masonry of which there is square fired brick. The original architectural appearance of the fortress is determined by the local stone of various sizes, which was used as a building material. At the northern wall, there are remains of an oval and various in volume rooms with plastered walls from the inside. These are deepened into the ground and at one time served as a pool for drinking water, a cellar for storing grain and other products. The main gates of the fortress are located on the southern wall. Their width is 1.95 meters. The flanking main entrance, high monolithic and sinking towers, are built on the rocks. In the case of an impending danger, a fire was lit on one of these towers, notifying about the danger by means of light and smoke signals.

The fortress’ territory profile is complex. In the narrowest part of the plan, between the opposing towers, there is a trace of a wall dividing the territory into two parts. On the northern wall in this place there is a narrow doorway, a secret exit, which, like the main gate, was closed by a massive shutter and locked with beams that extended into the thickness of the walls.

== See also ==
- Ilisu State Reserve
- Elisu Sultanate
- Ulu mosque
- Sumug-gala
- Icheri Bazar

== Literature ==
- V.Muradov (1980). Неисследованные памятники архитектуры сел. Илису Кахского района Азербайджанского ССР / The unexplored architectural monuments of the Ilisu villages of the Kakh region of the Azerbaijan SSR. Baku.
