= Ağasıbəyli =

Ağasıbəyli may refer to the following places in Azerbaijan:

- Aşağı Ağasıbəyli
- Yuxarı Ağasıbəyli
- Agasibeyli
