= Cırdaxan =

Cırdaxan or Jyrdakhan may refer to:

- Cırdaxan, Barda, Azerbaijan
- Cırdaxan, Samukh, Azerbaijan
- Cırdaxan, Yevlakh, Azerbaijan
