= Qədili =

Qədili may refer to:

- Qədili, Qubadli, Azerbaijan
- Qədili, Samukh, Azerbaijan
