= Alıncalı =

- Location within Azerbaijan
- Coordinates: 40°46′N 46°24′E
- Country: Azerbaijan
- Rayon: Samukh
- Time zone: UTC+4 (AZT)
  - Summer (DST): UTC+5 (AZT)

Alıncalı (also, Alyndzhaly) is a village in the Samukh Rayon of Azerbaijan.

There are 8 airports near Alıncalı, of which two are larger airports. The closest airport in Azerbaijan is Ganja Airport, which is a distance of 4 mi (or 6 km), South-West.

There are several Unesco world heritage sites nearby. The closest heritage site is the Monasteries of Haghpat and Sanahin in Armenia at a distance of 90 mi (or 145 km).
