= Khanlar Safaraliyev =

Azerbaijani politician (1878–1907)

Khanlar Safaraliyev Xanlar Səfərəliyev
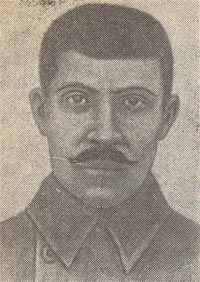
- Born: 1878; Gochahmadli, Elisabethpol Governorate, Russian Empire
- Died: 1907 (aged 28–29)

Khanlar Safaraliyev (Azerbaijani: Xanlar Səfərəliyev) (c.1878 – 26 September 1907) was an Azerbaijani oil field worker, labor organizer, and Moslem social democrat. In 1907, he helped lead a successful strike at the Baku oil fields. Subsequently, he was shot by an assassin, Jafar (a foreman in the oil fields), and died several days later. The Bibi Eybat District Committee of the Russian Social Democratic Labor Party declared a general two-day strike and unsuccessfully demanded that the Baku Oil & Gas Producers Association cease protecting Khanlar's murderer, and also the manager, Abuzarbek, who allegedly assisted in the assassination. 20,000 workers demonstrated at Khanlar's funeral.

Later, 29 September 1907, Joseph Stalin delivered a speech at Khanlar's graveside.

In 1938, the city of Helenendorf and the surrounding district in the Azerbaijan SSR were renamed Khanlar in honor of Khanlar Safaraliyev, though in 2008 the city was once more renamed to Goygol. Likewise, the Safaraliyev Rayon region of Azerbaijan and its main town both bore his name but the region was later abolished, and the town is now known as Samukh.
