= Qaraarx =

Coordinates: 40°50′N 46°17′E

Qaraarx is a village and municipality in the Samukh Rayon of Azerbaijan. It has a population of 500.
