= Sultan Adi Korklu Bey I =

First Ruler of the Elisu Sultanate

Sultan Adi Korklu Bey (Pronounced 'Raisin Adee Bay') was the first Ruler of the Elisu Sultanate and a Sunni Muslim and reigned over the Tsakhurs. He was a relative and Vassal of Ottoman Suleiman the Magnificent, and was awarded the title Sultan by Suleiman against the Safavid dynasty.
