= Çobanabdallı =

- Municipality
- Location within Azerbaijan
- Coordinates: 40°45′14″N 46°26′06″E
- Country: Azerbaijan
- Rayon: Samukh

Population
  - Total: 2,433
- Time zone: UTC+4 (AZT)
  - Summer (DST): UTC+5 (AZT)

Çobanabdallı (also, Çoban Abdallı and Chobanabdally) is a village and municipality in the Samukh Rayon of Azerbaijan. It has a population of 2,433.
