= Qovlarsarı =

- Municipality
- Location within Azerbaijan
- Coordinates: 40°47′10″N 46°19′51″E
- Country: Azerbaijan
- Rayon: Samukh

Population
  - Total: 1,210
- Time zone: UTC+4 (AZT)
  - Summer (DST): UTC+5 (AZT)

Qovlarsarı (also, Kovlarsary and Kovlyarsary) is a village and municipality in the Samukh Rayon of Azerbaijan. It has a population of 1,210.
