= Ziyadlı =

- Municipality
- Location within Azerbaijan
- Coordinates: 40°46′N 46°21′E
- Country: Azerbaijan
- Rayon: Samukh

Population
  - Total: 2,091
- Time zone: UTC+4 (AZT)

Ziyadlı (also, Ziyadly and Ziyatly) is a village and municipality in the Samukh Rayon of Azerbaijan. It has a population of 2,091.
