= Alıuşağı =

- Municipality
- Location within Azerbaijan
- Coordinates: 40°41′41″N 46°28′55″E
- Country: Azerbaijan
- Rayon: Samukh

Population
  - Total: 1,672
- Time zone: UTC+4 (AZT)
  - Summer (DST): UTC+5 (AZT)

Aliuşağı (also, Əliuşağı, Aliushagy, and Alyushagy) is a village and municipality in the Samukh Rayon of Azerbaijan. It has a population of 1,672.

== Notable people ==
- Xanim Xalilova (1903–1984), Soviet Azerbaijani cotton grower.
