= Ulu Mosque (İlisu) =

Mosque in İlisu, Gakh, Azerbaijan

- Azerbaijani: Ulu Məscid
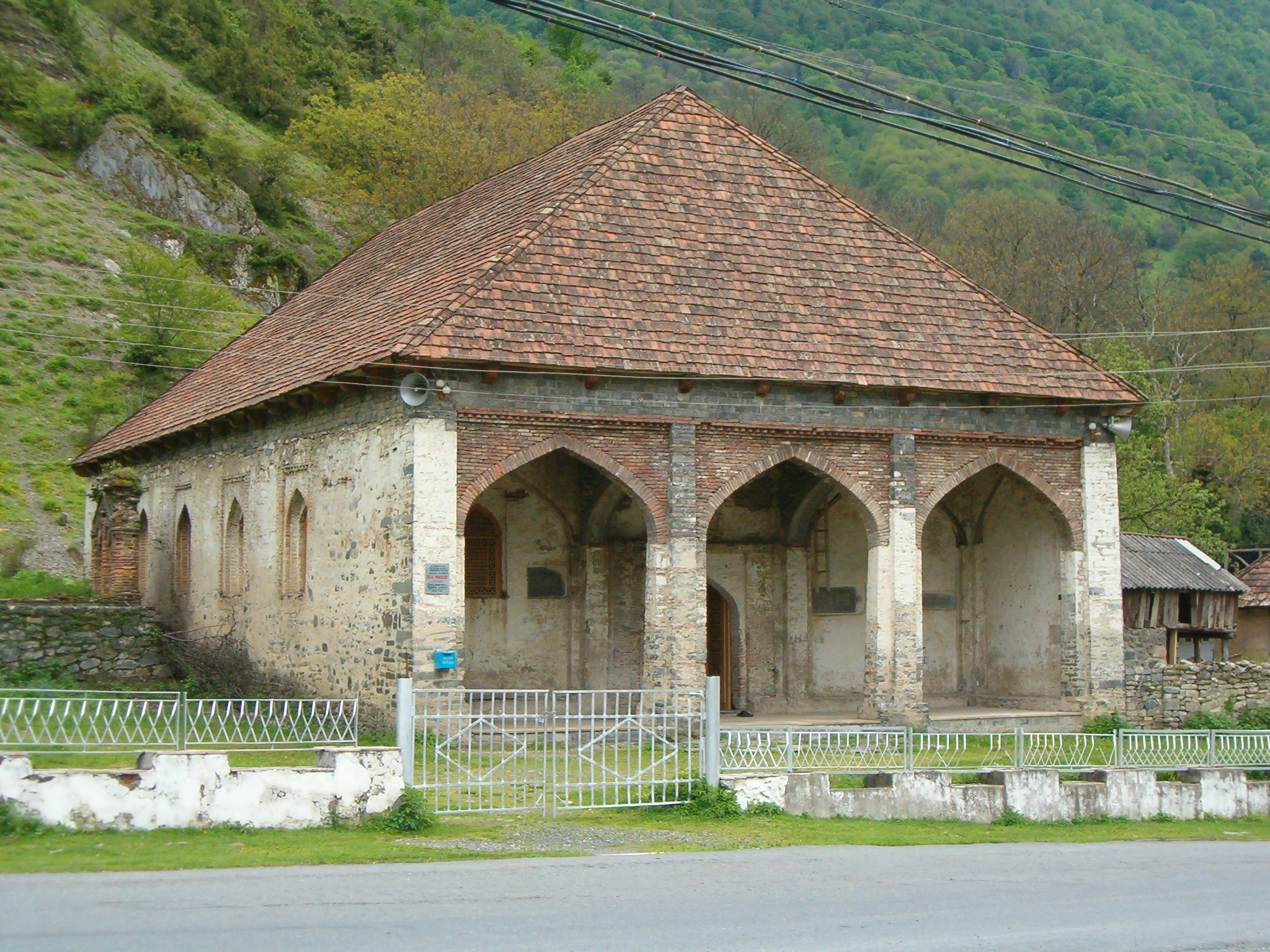
- The former mosque in c. 2010

- Location of the former mosque in Azerbaijan

Religion
- Affiliation: Sunni Islam (former)
- Ecclesiastical or organizational status: Mosque (former)
- Status: Abandoned (partially ruinous state)

Location
- Location: İlisu, Qax Rayon
- Country: Azerbaijan
- Interactive map of Ulu Mosque
- Coordinates: 41°28′05″N 47°03′14″E

Architecture
- Type: Mosque architecture
- Completed: 18th century
- Interior area: 13 m × 26 m (43 ft × 85 ft)

The Ulu Mosque (Azerbaijani: Ulu Məscid), also known as the Juma Mosque (Azerbaijani: Cümə Məscidi), is a former Sunni Islam Friday mosque located in Ilisu village, in the Gakh region of Azerbaijan.

Built in the 18th century, by the order of the Cabinet of Ministers of the Republic of Azerbaijan dated with 2 August 2001, the former mosque was taken under state protection as an architectural monument of national importance.

== Architecture ==
The former mosque is located on the main square of the Ilisu village and is of a great importance in the village’s planning structure and development. The architectural and spatial solution of the monument is determined both by the local natural and climatic conditions and by the construction techniques and materials. On its plan, the mosque has the shape of a strongly elongated rectangle measuring 13 m × 26 m (43 ft × 85 ft) with the main compositional axis North-South.

The rectangle consists of two squares, which, in turn, are divided into nine cells with the help of stone cruciform supports and pointed arches resting on them. Three northern cells, which are separated by a wall with an arched portal and window openings, form the portico-eivan. This element is typical for all mosques of the Kakh group and takes an active place in the volumetric-spatial composition of this structure.

The most characteristic feature of the former mosque is the clearly expressed simplicity of its spatial composition, as well as the organic connection between the division of the facade and the internal structure of the building. The main one is the northern facade of the mosque. It is cut by three lancet openings of an elegant design, which are framed by a rectangular protruding frame. This design of façade wall is typical for the architecture of religious buildings of the 17th century in Azerbaijan.

The prayer hall is divided into three naves of equal width. The axis of the central nave is fixed by a mihrab, which is modestly executed. The interior plan of the mosque is broken down, considering the coincidence with the constructive step of the external and internal supports. The pillars and arches of the interior are projected onto the outer walls in the form of pilasters and flat arches. The interpretation of both the external façades of the mosque and its interior is done with restraint. However, thanks to the well-found ratios of architectural forms, it was possible to achieve the expressiveness of the interior.

== See also ==
- Icheri Bazar
- Islam in Azerbaijan
- List of mosques in Azerbaijan
- Sumug-gala
