= İstixana =

Village in Samukh Rayon, Azerbaijan

Coordinates: 40°46′N 46°20′E

İstixana is a village and municipality in the Samukh Rayon of Azerbaijan. It has a population of 656.
