= Xanim Xalilova =

Azerbaijani cotton grower (1903–1984)

- Xanım Hacı qızı Xəlilova
- Born: Xanim Haci qizi Xalilova; 1903; Alıuşağı, Elizavetpol Governorate, Russian Empire
- Died: 1984 (aged 80–81); Alıuşağı, Azerbaijan SSR
- Occupations: Cotton grower, collective farmer
- Awards: Hero of Socialist Labour (1948); Order of Lenin (1948); Medal "For Labour Valour" (1949)

Xanim Haci qizi Xalilova (Azerbaijani: Xanım Hacı qızı Xəlilova 1903–1984) was a Soviet Azerbaijani cotton grower who was awarded the title of Hero of Socialist Labour and the Order of Lenin in 1948 in recognition for her large cotton harvests on a Soviet collective farm. She was also later received the Medal "For Labour Valour".

== Early life ==
Xanim Haci qizi Xalilova was born in 1903 in the village of Alıuşağı in the Elizavetpolsky Province (now in the Samukh District of Azerbaijan).

== Career ==
In 1931, she began work as a farmer on the Lenin collective farm in the Safaraliyev District, and later became a team leader there. In 1947, the team she led harvested 88.42 centners of cotton per hectare on an area of 5 hectares. In recognition of the high yield in addition to maintaining her farm duties, Xalilova was awarded the title of Hero of Socialist Labour with the Order of Lenin and Hammer and Sickle gold medal on 10 March 1948, by decree of the Presidium of the Supreme Soviet of the Soviet Union. The following year on 1 July, she was granted the Medal "For Labour Valour".

Xalilova later worked as team leader on the Malenkov and Azerbaijan collective farms. She officially became a member of the Communist Party of the Soviet Union in 1953. Xalilova participated in the All-Union Agricultural Exhibition in Moscow in 1954 and 1957. Her large harvests in 1956 and 1957 led the exhibition committee to honour her with a bronze medal in February 1958.

== Later life and death ==
Her final farm work before her retirement was at the Ganja state farm in the Khanlar district. She retired in 1964, and four years later began receiving a personal pension of union significance from the Soviet government. Xalilova died in her native village in 1984.
