= Cırdaxan, Samukh =

Jyrdakhan
- Azerbaijani: Cırdaxan
- Location within Azerbaijan
- Coordinates: 40°47′17″N 46°19′09″E
- Country: Azerbaijan
- District: Samukh
- Time zone: UTC+4 (AZT)
  - Summer (DST): UTC+5 (AZT)

Cırdaxan (also, Jyrdakhan) is a village in the Samukh District of Azerbaijan.
