= Aşağı Ağasıbəyli =

- Municipality
- Location within Azerbaijan
- Coordinates: 40°46′17″N 46°31′01″E
- Country: Azerbaijan
- Rayon: Samukh

Population
  - Total: 442
- Time zone: UTC+4 (AZT)
  - Summer (DST): UTC+5 (AZT)

Aşağı Ağasıbəyli (also, Agasy-Begly, Ashagy Agasibeyli, and Ashagy-Begly) is a village and municipality in the Samukh Rayon of Azerbaijan. It has a population of 442.
