= Yuxarı Ağasıbəyli =

- Municipality
- Location within Azerbaijan
- Coordinates: 40°46′N 46°32′E
- Country: Azerbaijan
- Rayon: Samukh

Population
  - Total: 1,097
- Time zone: UTC+4 (AZT)

Yuxarı Ağasıbəyli (also, Yukhary Agasibeyli) is a village and municipality in the Samukh Rayon of Azerbaijan. It has a population of 1,097.
