= Qədili, Samukh =

Qədili
- Municipality
- Location within Azerbaijan
- Coordinates: 40°52′37″N 46°18′13″E
- Country: Azerbaijan
- Rayon: Samukh

Population
  - Total: 328
- Time zone: UTC+4 (AZT)
  - Summer (DST): UTC+5 (AZT)

Qədılı (until 2008, Hadılı; also, Qadılı, and Kadyly) is a village and the least populous municipality in the Samukh Rayon of Azerbaijan. It has a population of 328.
