= Safaraliyev Rayon =

Coordinates: 40°49′57″N 46°30′35″E

Safaraliyev
- (former) Rayon
- Map of Azerbaijan showing Samukh (former Safaraliyev) Rayon
- Country: Azerbaijan

Safaraliyev (Azerbaijani: Səfərəliyev) was a rayon (administrative region) of Azerbaijan from 1940 to 1959.

== History ==
Safaraliyev Rayon was created on January 24, 1940, detached from the Ganjabasar rayon by Decree No.11 of the Supreme Soviet of the Azerbaijan SSR. It was named after Khanlar Safaraliyev, an early Azerbaijani socialist active at the same time as Stalin in the Baku Oil Fields and leader of the 1907 strike. In 1954 the region's area expanded by the addition of the territory of the then abolished Samux Rayon which had become untenable geographically following the construction of a large reservoir for the Mingechevir Hydro Power Plant. However, in 1959, Safaraliyev Rayon was itself abolished. Today a new Samukh Rayon, reborn on February 18, 1992, essentially covers the same area as the former Safaraliyev Rayon centred on Safaraliyev settlement, itself renamed Samux since 2008.
