= Sumug-gala =

- Sumuq qala (Azerbaijani)
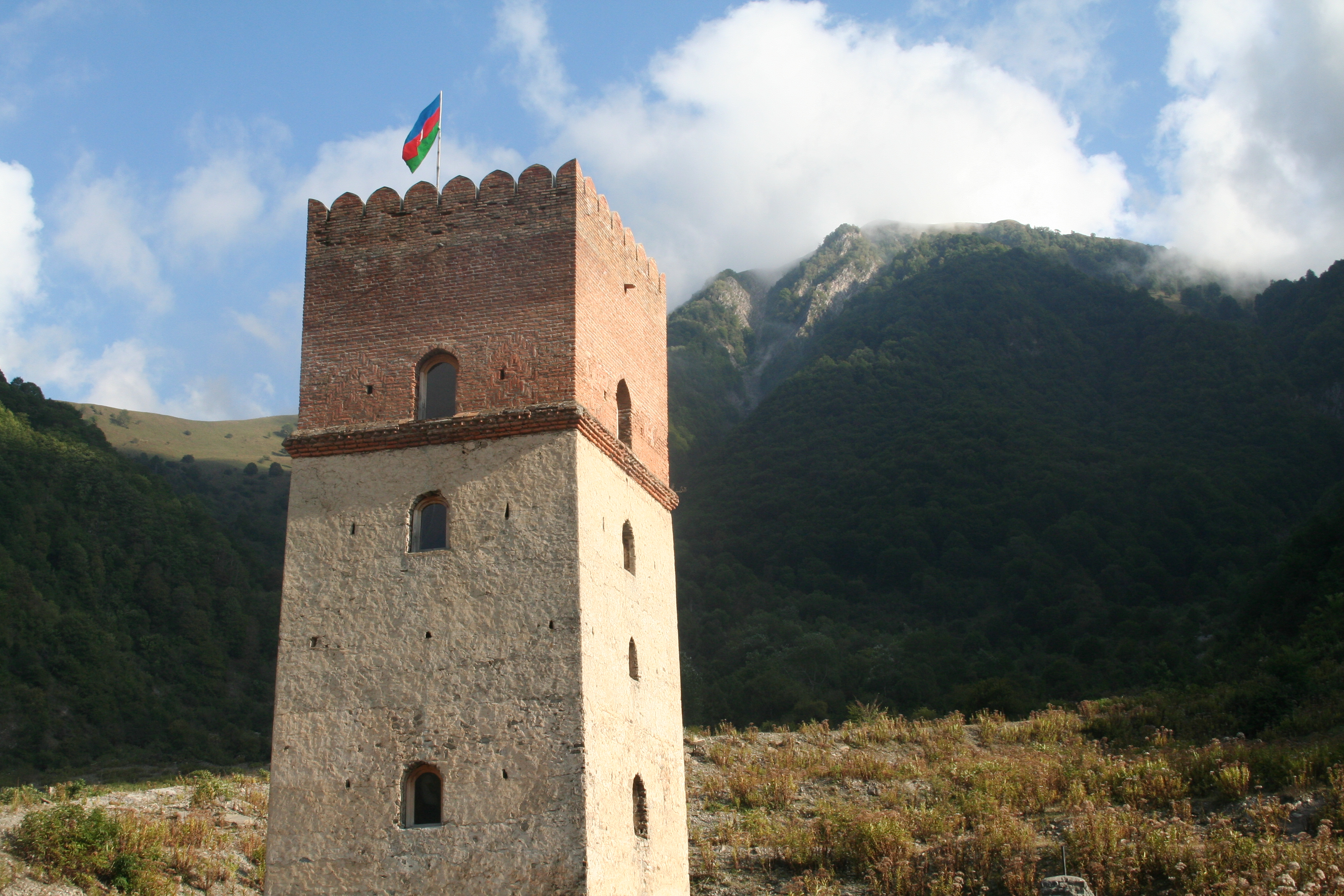
- Interactive map of Sumug-gala
- Location: İlisu, Gakh, Azerbaijan

History
- Built: XVII-XVIII

Sumug-gala (Azerbaijani: Sumuq-Qala) is a defence castle in the Bucag neighborhood of İlisu village of Gakh region. It was built in the 17th-18th century.

== Overview ==
It is an example of a defense castle that is adjacent to a dwelling house of people living in the mountainous region with the aim of protection from the enemy. In the construction of the tower, river stones, lime mortar and baked bricks were used. There are some considerations regarding the name of the fortress.

According to the legend, the tower was built by a judge of Elisu called Sumu Khan.

Sumug-gala is also famous for the Soviet film "Qorxma mən səninləyəm" (Don't afraid I'm with you). Polad Bulbuloglu and Lev Durov were featured in this film directed by Yuli Gusman.
