= Agasibeyli =

- Location within Azerbaijan
- Coordinates: 41°08′N 49°07′E
- Country: Azerbaijan
- Rayon: Siazan
- Time zone: UTC+4 (AZT)
  - Summer (DST): UTC+5 (AZT)

Agasibeyli (also, Agasi-Bek-Obasi) is a village in the Siazan Rayon of Azerbaijan.

== Toponymic explanation ==
Aghasibeyli – village in Vedibasar area, Iravan khanate. Local pronunciation form is as Aghasli. In 1828-1832 the Azerbaijanian population was expatriated and the village was ruined. In 1926 the village was settled by Kurds and Armenians. In the 1940s the village was liquidated. Aghasibeyli is the name of a tribe who founded the village.

== See also ==
- Iravan Khanate

== Literature ==
- Петрушевский И.П. Очерки по истории феодальных отношений Азербайджана и Армении в XVI - начале XIX вв. Л., 1949.
- Azərbaycanın izahlı coğrafi adlar luğəti. Bakı, 1960.
