= Qakh (city) =

Qakh Qax

- Location within Azerbaijan Location within Shaki-Zagatala Economic Region
- Coordinates: 41°25′21″N 46°55′27″E
- Country: Azerbaijan
- District: Qakh
- Established: 1967
- Elevation: 596 m (1,955 ft)

Population (2013)
  - Total: 13,800
- Time zone: UTC+4 (AZT)
- Area code: +994 144

Qakh (Azerbaijani: Qax, Georgian: კახი) is the capital of the Qakh District in the north of Azerbaijan, near the Russian border.

== History ==
The Qakh region of Azerbaijan has a long history dating back to ancient times. Archaeological excavations suggest the area had been populated during Eneolithic, Bronze and early Iron Ages. What remains of these early inhabitants' activities indicates they engaged largely in sedentary cultivation, animal-breeding and art. According to historians, the territory of Qakh was a part of the Scythian Kingdom in the 7th century B.C.

Initially this territory of modern Qakh was a province of Caucasian Albania. After that, the region was a separate kingdom of Kakheti within the Georgian cultural and political influence. During the medieval era what later became known as Saingilo was mostly controlled by the kingdom of Georgia and Shirvan.

With the spread of Christianity throughout the region during the existence of Caucasian Albania, some Christian temples were built in the Qakh district. In the 8th century A.D., Qakh came under Umayyad Sovereignty. Starting from the 11th century first Oghuz Turks and later Qipchaq Turks inhabited the area, the region was incorporated into Great Seljuq Empire. Qakh was later a part of the Atabeg and Shirvanshah states. With invasion of Hulaguids in Azerbaijan in the 13th century, Mongolian nomadic tribes populated the region. In 1562, by the order of the Safavid Shah Tahmasp I, Elisu Sultanate was established in Qakh. In the 18th century, the Elisu Sultanate became so powerful that, the Ottoman Emperor conferred its ruler —'Ali-Sultan— Bey, the highest title of Pasha, recognizing him as the Beylerbey of Shaki.

In 1803, the sultanate of Elisu was annexed by the Russian Empire. The ruler of the sultanate, Daniyal, inspired the people to rise against Russian rule in 1844, due to a disagreement between him and the government of Russia. Sultan Daniyel was defeated near the village of İlisu and continued his struggle against Russians along with the leader of the national freedom movement — Imam Shamil. Russians burnt Elisu and divided the territory of the sultanate into mahals (territorial units) and annexed them to the Jar-Balaken daire (territorial unit) converting it into a colony of tsarist Russia. With proclamation of independence of the Azerbaijan Democratic Republic in May 1918, Qakh was retained within Azerbaijan. During the Soviet rule, Qakh was established as a raion of the Azerbaijan SSR in 1930.

It was part of the Zakatala okrug of Tiflis Governorate 1860–1917, the Transcaucasian Democratic Federative Republic 1917–1918, and the Georgian Democratic Republic 1918–1921 before passing to Azerbaijan in March 1922.

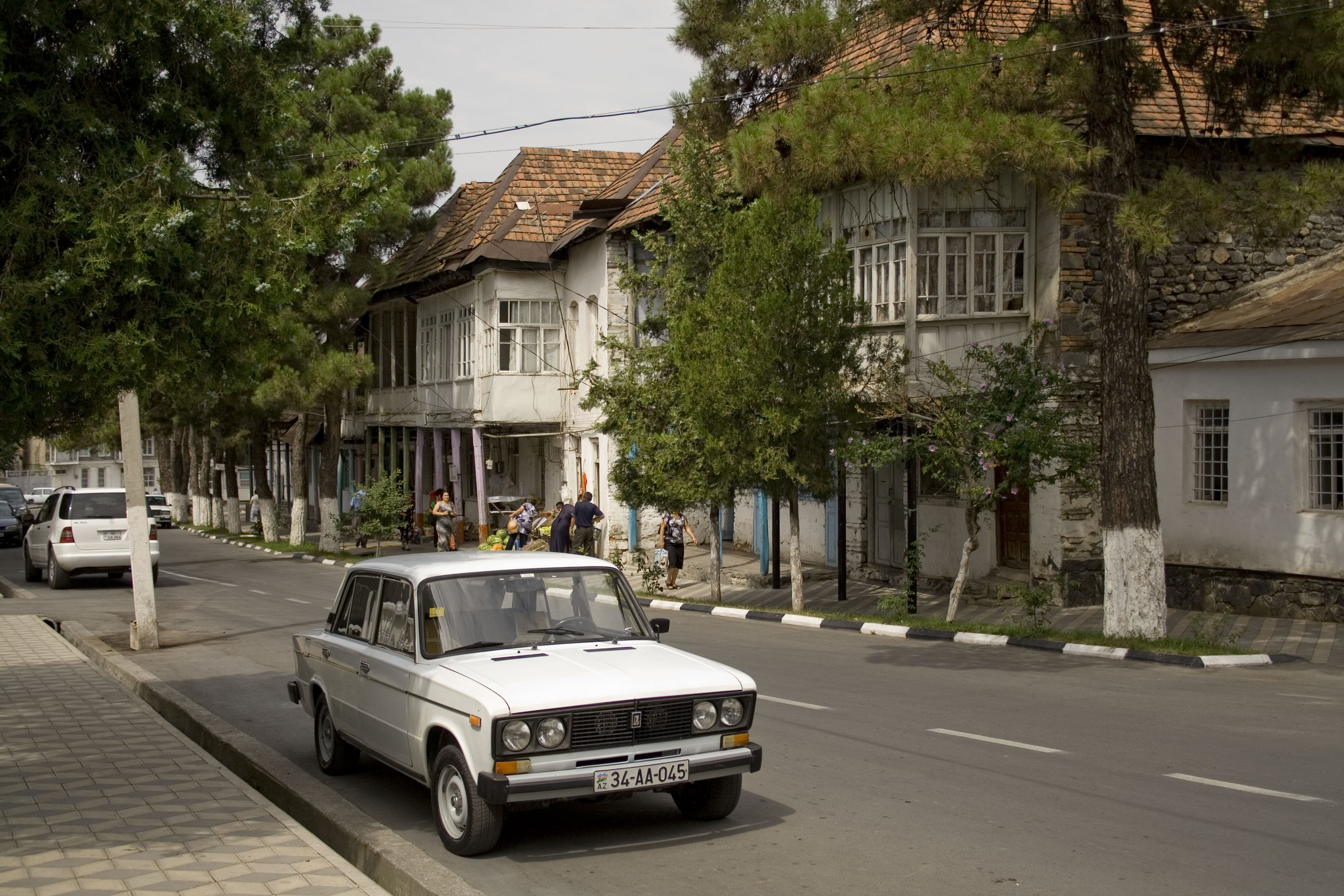
A main street in Qakh.

== Geography ==
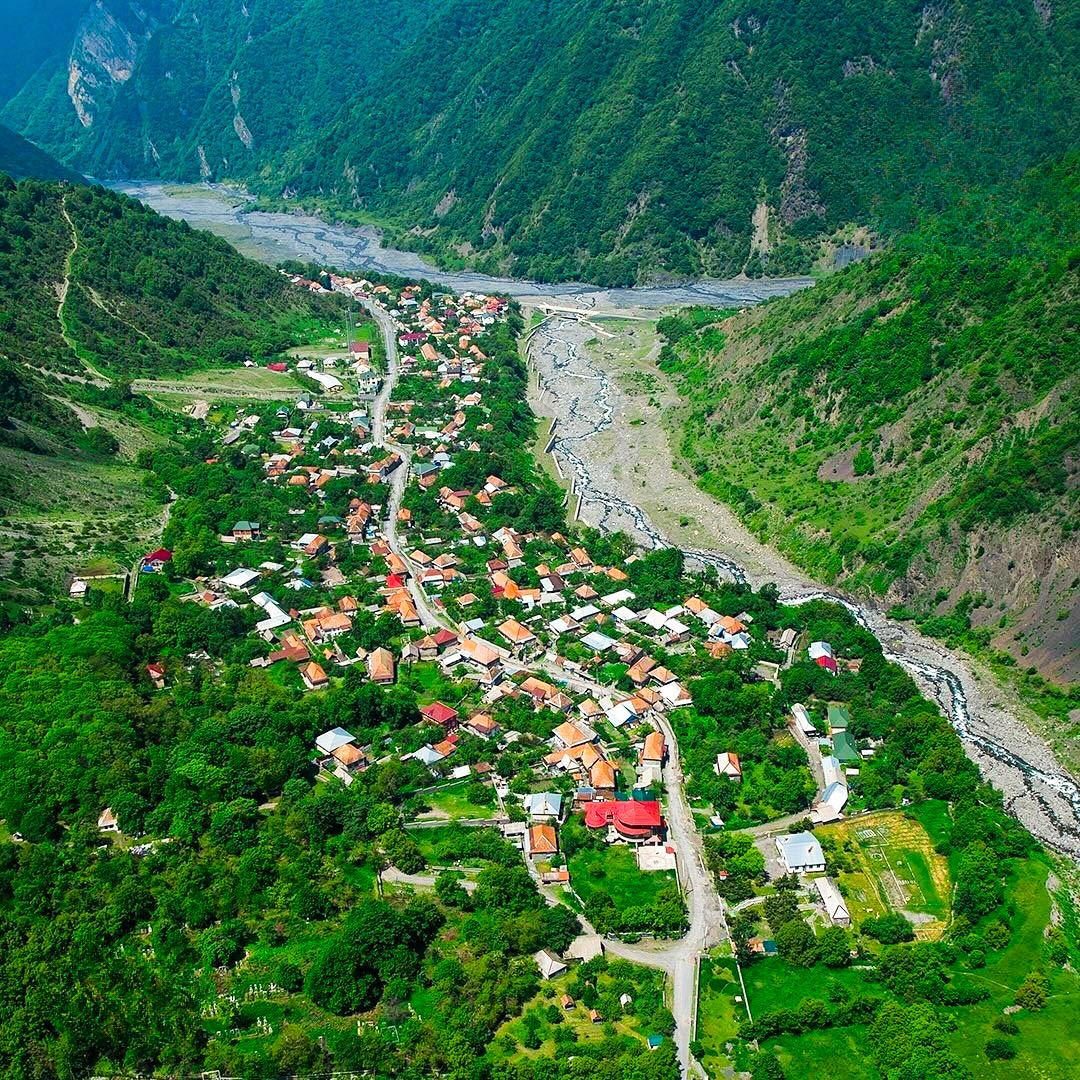
View of Gakh City

The area of the region occupies 1,494 km^{2} (577 sq mi) bordering Russia on the north, and Georgia on the west. It also shares internal boundaries with Zaqatala District in the northwest, Yevlakh and Samukh regions in the south, and Shaki region in the east.

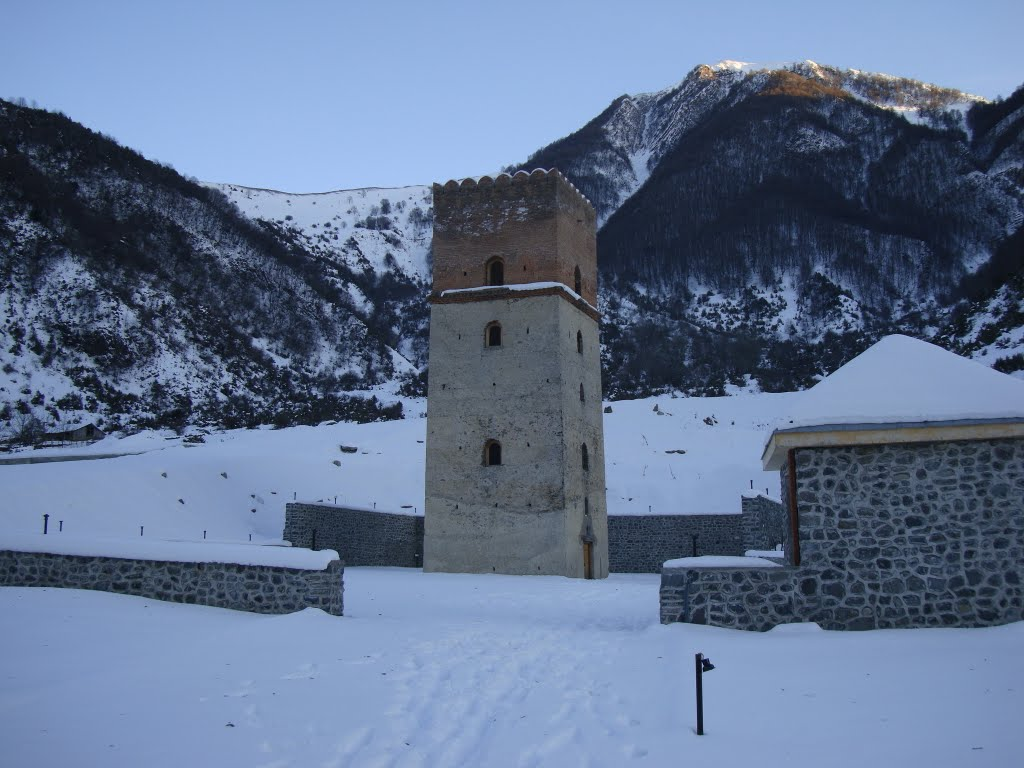
Ilisu, Gakh

== Demographics ==
The majority of Qakh's population are Azerbaijani people, although the city and region themselves are multicultural. Avar and Georgian (Ingiloy) inhabitant minorities also live in this area. Based on the military review of the Tiflis province and the Zagatala circle, which was published in 1872 and published the results of the census of 1869, 160 families, consisting of mugals and ingiloys, were nationalized in Gakh village, included in the Ilisu Congregation of Zagatala. Ethnic Turks mugals and representatives of the Dagestan peoples are referred to as Lezghins in the information about the national composition of the population of the settlements that constitute the relevant circle. According to official information as of January 1, 2012, there are a total of 13,793 people living in 2,490 farms of both sexes.

== Culture ==
Culture and Tourism Department of the district was organized in 1949 as the Department of Culture. The first head of the department was Hajiyev Abdurakhman. In 2006, the Ministry of Culture and Tourism was established on the basis of the Ministry of Culture of the Republic of Azerbaijan with the Decree of the President of the Republic of Azerbaijan Ilham Aliyev dated 30 January 2006. At present the network of the Department of Culture and Tourism has 96 enterprises and 1 monument guards. 49 libraries, 23 culture houses, 17 clubs, Heydar Aliyev Center, 2 museums (History Linguistics Museum, I. Dagestani memorial museum), Ilisu Historical Culture Reserve, Painting Gallery and Art School, totally 506 employees.

There are two hotels in the region, a recreation and treatment center "Shafa", Ilisu boarding house, "Green park", "Ulu", "Improteks", "Ulu mountain" tourism and leisure centers and "Eden" Park hotel, "Sanjar Qala" recreation center, "El Resort" five star hotel serves tourists. The prices in tourism centers range from £25 to £55. The number of places in tourism facilities has reached 600. If in 2011 about 15 thousand tourists had rest, in 2012 this figure was about 20 thousand.

== Transport ==
All road transport is available in the city. There are daily buses heading to Qakh from the Baku International bus station and it takes six hours of traveling. Taxis are available both at the bus station and as a general means of driving. Trains can also be taken to Qakh from Baku's central railway station. There is a daily working bus which drives from Qakh city to Ilisu, village and municipality in Qakh region. Roads to some inner villages are not available without offroad cars.

== Education ==
During the year there were 56 general education schools, including 30 full secondary, 16 general secondary schools, 9 elementary schools, and 1273 teachers engaged in 7373 students were trained. 1093 of them are higher (85.9%) and 179 (14.1%) have secondary special education. 1830 children were enrolled in public education in 36 pre-school institutions of the district, while 1068 students in 4 out-of-school facilities were leisurely. By the end of the school year, 616 people were enrolled from the first grade to the second grade (646 last year) and 774 (843 last year) have certificates of secondary education and 541 – full secondary education certificates. The full-time secondary school #4 in the "Best School" and "Best Teacher" Republican Contest held by the Order of the President of the Republic of Azerbaijan Ilham Aliyev was the winner of the competition. Teachers and pupils of secondary schools of the district have achieved successful results in the district, zone, republican and international events. Thus, in the international competition "Inepo-Eurasia" Elmir Mukhtarov and Minaya Ahmedzadeh (teacher Rena Ahmadova) took 2nd place and won "silver" medals. The teachers and pupils of the district schools of the region represented our region at the national competition "Energy and the Environment" within the framework of the Norwegian Nature Conservation Society and the Azerbaijan Youth Union's "International School Project Olympiad". They succeeded. Parvana Hajiyeva and Ayshan Hajizadeh (teacher Nazaket Azimova), pupils of secondary school N2, Samra Shabanova and Yusif Yusifli (teacher Rena Ahmadova) took part in the contest. Of the 444 graduates of the XI grade of secondary schools of the district in 2011–2012, 299 applicants applied for higher education institutions and 297 participated in entrance exams. According to the results of the admission, 154 students in the previous academic year received 160 students this year. The number of those who collected more than 600 points in the academic year was 16, while the number of those students in this academic year is 8.

== Notable residents ==
- Khanim Balajayeva, chess player born March 28, 2001, in Qakh; Azerbaijani women's champion in 2018 and 2020, a Woman Grandmaster since 2019, and an International Master since 2023
- Mose Janashvili, Georgian ethnographer, linguist, and historian who was born in Qakh on 19 March, 1855
- Imam Mustafayev, scientist and politician who was born in Qakh on 25 February 1910
- Anar Nazirov, professional footballer who plays as goalkeeper for Zira FK in the Azerbaijani Premier League

== International relations ==
=== Twin towns — Sister cities ===
Qakh is twinned with the following cities:

- Bormio, Italy, (since 2014)
