= Cırdaxan, Yevlakh =

Cırdaxan
- Municipality
- Location within Azerbaijan
- Coordinates: 40°38′42″N 47°06′42″E
- Country: Azerbaijan
- Rayon: Yevlakh

Population
  - Total: 455
- Time zone: UTC+4 (AZT)
  - Summer (DST): UTC+5 (AZT)

Cırdaxan (also, Dzhirdakhan and Dzhyrdakhan) is a small village and municipality in the Yevlakh Rayon of Azerbaijan. It has a population of 455.
