= Cırdaxan, Barda =

Jyrdakhan
- Azerbaijani: Cırdaxan
- Location within Azerbaijan
- Coordinates: 40°18′50″N 47°14′36″E
- Country: Azerbaijan
- District: Barda
- Time zone: UTC+4 (AZT)
  - Summer (DST): UTC+5 (AZT)

Cırdaxan (also, Jyrdakhan) is a village in the Barda District of Azerbaijan.
