= Qədili, Qubadli =

Qədili
- Location within Azerbaijan
- Coordinates: 39°25′45″N 46°24′36″E
- Country: Azerbaijan
- District: Qubadli
- Time zone: UTC+4 (AZT)
  - Summer (DST): UTC+5 (AZT)

Qədili is a village in the Qubadli Rayon of Azerbaijan.
