= Elisu Sultanate =

Sultinate in the 18th and 19th centuries

- 1604–1844
- Flag

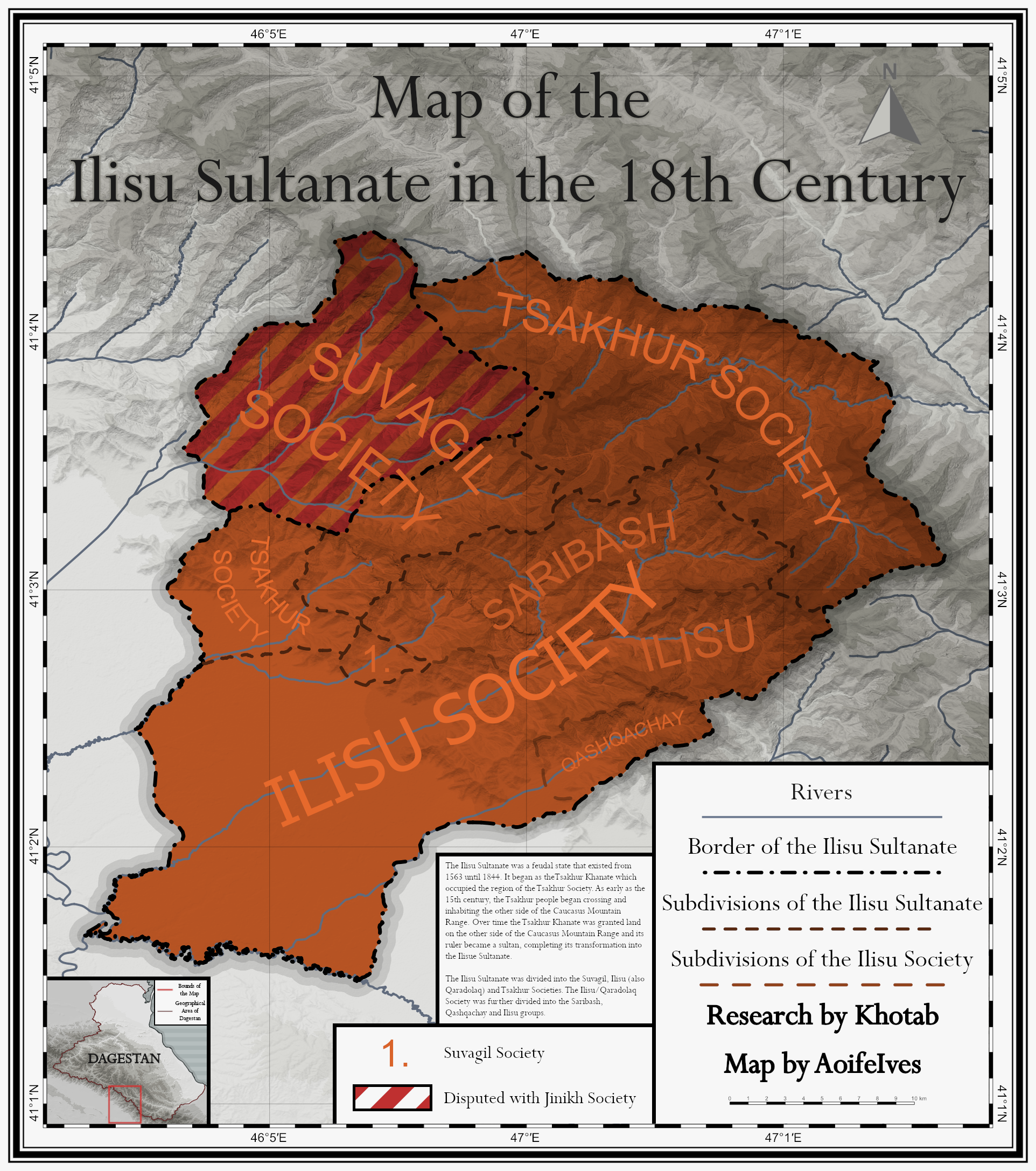
- Map of the Elisu Sultanate in the 18th century
- Status: Sultanate
- Capital: Tsakhur (16-18th century); İlisu
- Common languages: Tsakhur, Azerbaijani, Georgian.
- Religion: Islam (majority) and Georgian Orthodox Church (minority)

Government
  - Sultan: Ali Sultan of Elisu
- Historical era: Early modern
  - Established with Safavid support: 1604
  - Russian conquest: 1844
Preceded by	Succeeded by
Tsakhur Khanate	Russian Empire
- Today part of: Azerbaijan; Georgia

The Sultanate of Elisu, also known as Elisou or Ilisu, was a sultanate in the 18th and 19th centuries.

== Geography, population and government ==
Located mostly on the southern slope of the Caucasus Mountains in what is now northwest Azerbaijan, it extended from north of the mountain crest down to the Alazani river valley. Southeast in the lowlands was the Shirvan Khanate and northwest along the mountains were the Djaro-Belokani communities. Djaro-Belokan and Elisu were closely connected.

The mountainous north was inhabited by Tsakhurs and the low country by Azerbaijanis and the Ingiloys (Muslim Georgians). The upper class was Tsakhur. In local usage, a Sultan was below a Khan and above a Bey. The Sultanate was partly hereditary and partly elected by a Jamaat, an assembly of notables. He was often confirmed by the Persian Shah. In a few cases, he was imposed by whoever had a large army nearby. For a few purposes, the Sultan was almost a member of the Djaro-Belokani.

== History ==
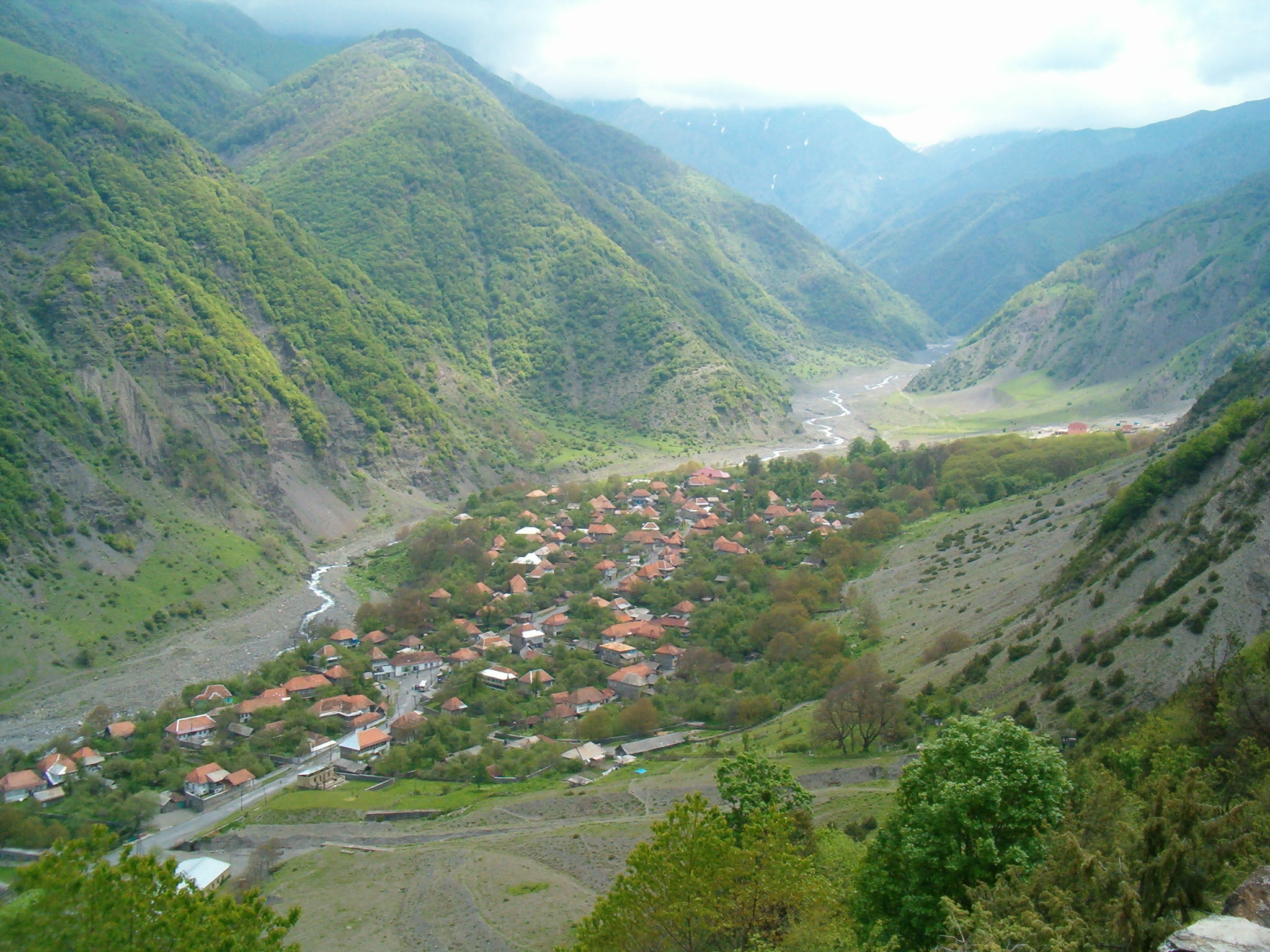
Elisu today

The history of the Sultanate begins north of the mountains in the upper reaches of the Samur River (Rutulsky District) with the Tsakhur people, a western branch of the Lezgians. They formed the Tsakhur Khanate and paid tribute to the Gazikumukh Shamkhalate.

In the 15th century, the Tsakhurs began moving south over the mountain crest toward the Alazani River. They settled in the province of Hereti of the Kingdom of Kakheti. In the early 17th century, Shah Abbas I of Persia took the lands from the king of Kakheti and granted them to the Dagestani feudal clans, which enjoyed a degree of autonomy (Djar-Beylakan society, the sultanate of Ilisu). the area was an 'ulka' of the Shirvan Khanate. The rulers were also vassals of Persia and sometimes the Ottoman Empire, depending on the relative power of each. At the beginning of the 18th century, the capital moved south from the town of Tsakhur to İlisu, and the Elisu Sultanate is now heard of. The Elisu dynasty belonged to the Sunni denomination of Islam. The first ruler was Sultan Adi Korklu Bey, who established the Elisu Sultanate on March 8, 1563 and was a Tsakhur.

In 1711, Haji Davud a Lezgin ruler from Mushkur led a campaign against Safavid Iran, and the ruler of Elisu Ali Sultan II became one of his closest and long lasting allies, the campaign was partly a Sunni-Shia conflict. Ali Sultan of Elisu captured a wide area and the Turkic people in the region proclaimed him as the beylerbey of Shaki. Nadir Shah drove the Ottomans out in 1735. When his army returned to south in 1738, Jar-Balakan and Elisu rose up again. Brother of Nadir Shah was killed suppressing it, and Ali Sultan was forcibly replaced by his son. At some point, Nadir Shah entered Elisu and burned parts of it. As soon as he left, the Begs, who had fled to the mountains, returned and replaced his puppet sultan.

The Russian Empire took over the Kingdom of Kartli-Kakheti in 1801. Pavel Tsitsianov pushed east to the Caspian Sea from 1803 to 1806. In April, General Vasily Gulyakov subdued the Djaro-Belokani area. They submitted and so received the Elisu Sultanate. In October, the mountaineers rose again with the help of the Gazikumukh Khanate and were defeated. In January 1804, Gulyakov chased them deep into the mountains and was killed. The Djaris did not pay tribute and blamed the Sultan, and in 1805, he was replaced by Akhmed Khan, who went to Tiflis to offer submission. In 1826, during the Russo-Persian War, Akhmed Khan was driven out by the Begs and replaced by Bala-Aga-Beg. The Russians returned, restored Akhmed and took Bala-Aga away in chains.

In 1830, the Djaris revolted but submitted when troops approached. They were placed under the Djari Oblast with the Sultanate attached the year that Daniyal Bek became Sultan. In 1842, when the Murid War was going poorly for the Russians, the Sultanate was placed under the Djaro-Belokani Military Okrug under General Grigory Schwarz. By 1844 Daniyal Sultan was either pushed or pulled into the arms of Shamil. Schwarz took Elisu by storm, and the Sultanate was abolished. Daniyal fled and became one of Shamil's best officers. His daughter married Shamil's son. After Shamil's movement collapsed, Daniyal submitted for a full pardon. The last Sultan of Elisu died in the Ottoman Empire in 1873 in Istanbul. His descendants now live in Azerbaijan in the сities of Qakh, Shaki, Nəbiağalı, Goychay, Ganja, and Baku and use the surname Sultanov if male and Sultanova if female. Descendants also live in Turkey, in the city of Istanbul.

== See also ==
- Jinli Castle

== Sources ==
- Bournoutian, George (2016). "Prelude to War: The Russian Siege and Storming of the Fortress of Ganjeh, 1803–4". Iranian Studies. 50 (1). Taylor & Francis: 107–124. doi:10.1080/00210862.2016.1159779. S2CID 163302882.
- Bournoutian, George (2021). From the Kur to the Aras: A Military History of Russia's Move into the South Caucasus and the First Russo-Iranian War, 1801–1813. Brill. ISBN 978-9004445154.
