= Samukh =

- Municipality
- Location within Azerbaijan
- Coordinates: 40°45′57″N 46°24′32″E
- Country: Azerbaijan
- District: Samukh

Population (2008)
  - Total: 6,013
- Time zone: UTC+4 (AZT)

Samukh (Azerbaijani: Samux, formerly known as Nəbiağalı (1992–2008)) (also, Sabarkend, Sabir, Safarabad, Safaraliyeb, and Safaraliyev) is a city and the most populous municipality in, and the administrative center of, the Samukh District of Azerbaijan. It has a population of 6,013.
