= Icheri Bazar (Qakh Fortress Wall) =

Wall in Qakh, Azerbaijan

Coordinates: 41.46611°N 47.05917°E

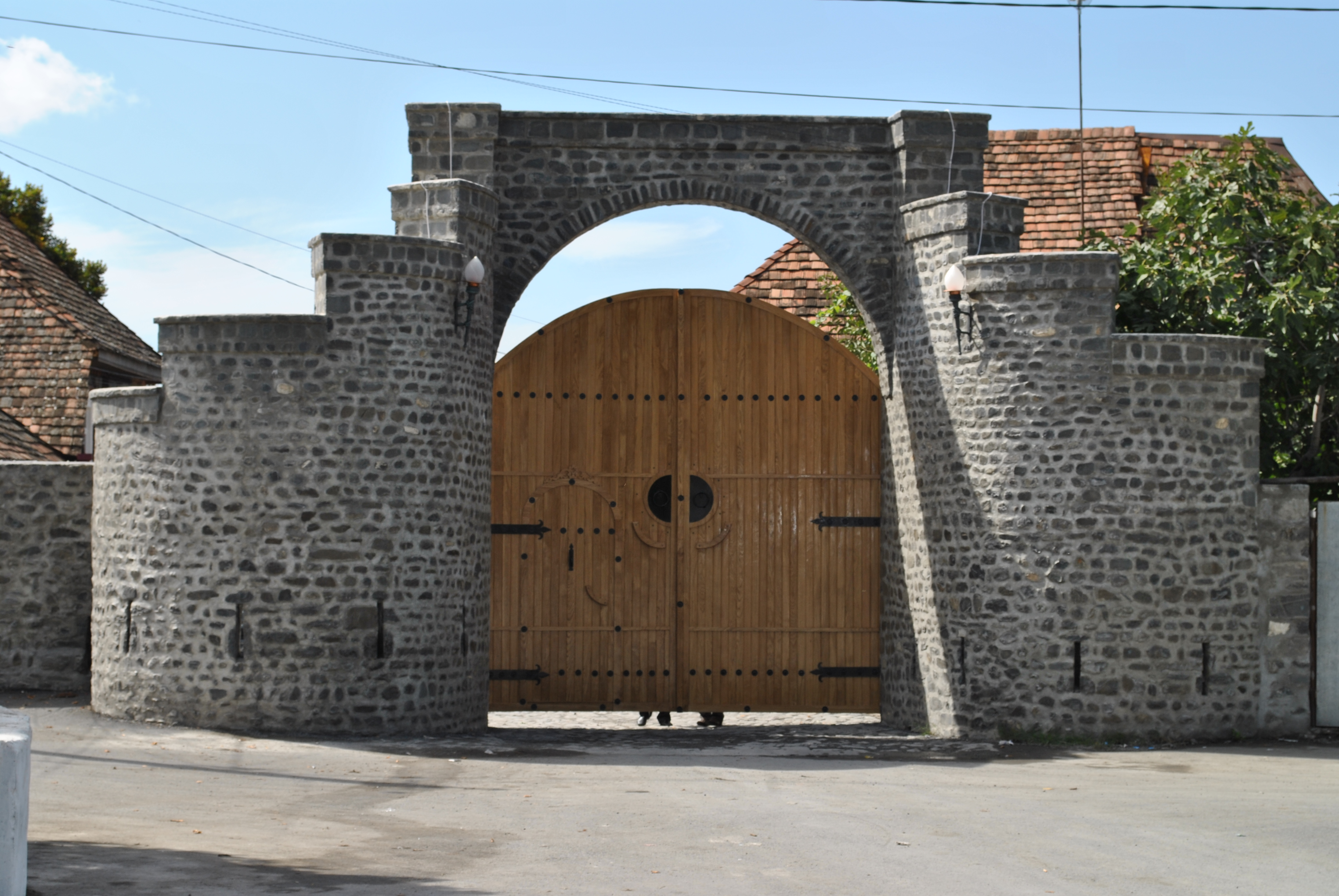
- Interactive map of Icheri Bazar (Qakh Fortress Wall)
- Location: Qakh, Azerbaijan

The Icheri Bazar (Qakh Fortress Wall) is located in the center of Qakh city, Azerbaijan. It was built in the first half of the 18th century and was renovated by the Russians in the 19th century.

The city block consists of ten brick houses and two fortress walls.

== Images ==
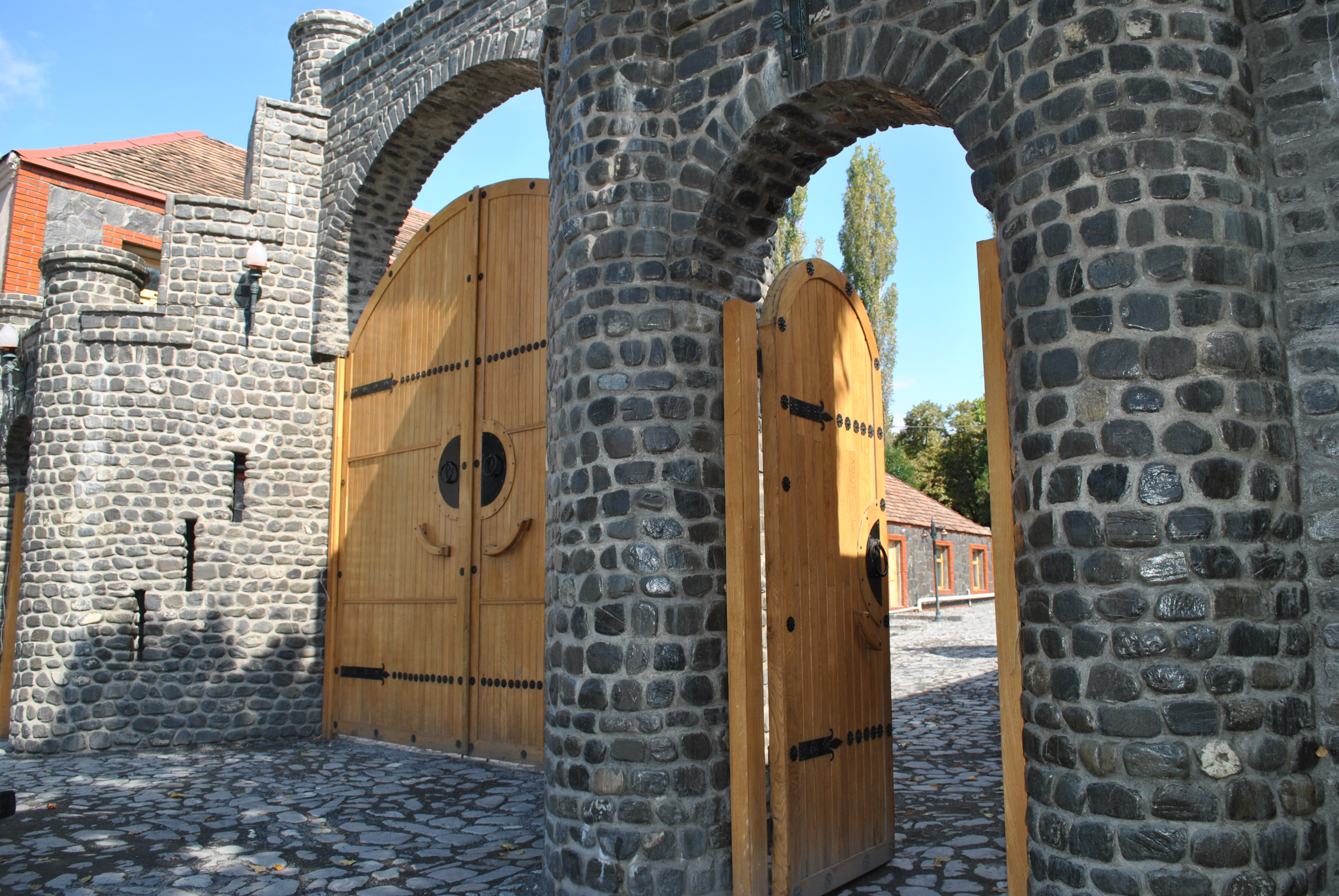
Icheri Bazar street, Entrance

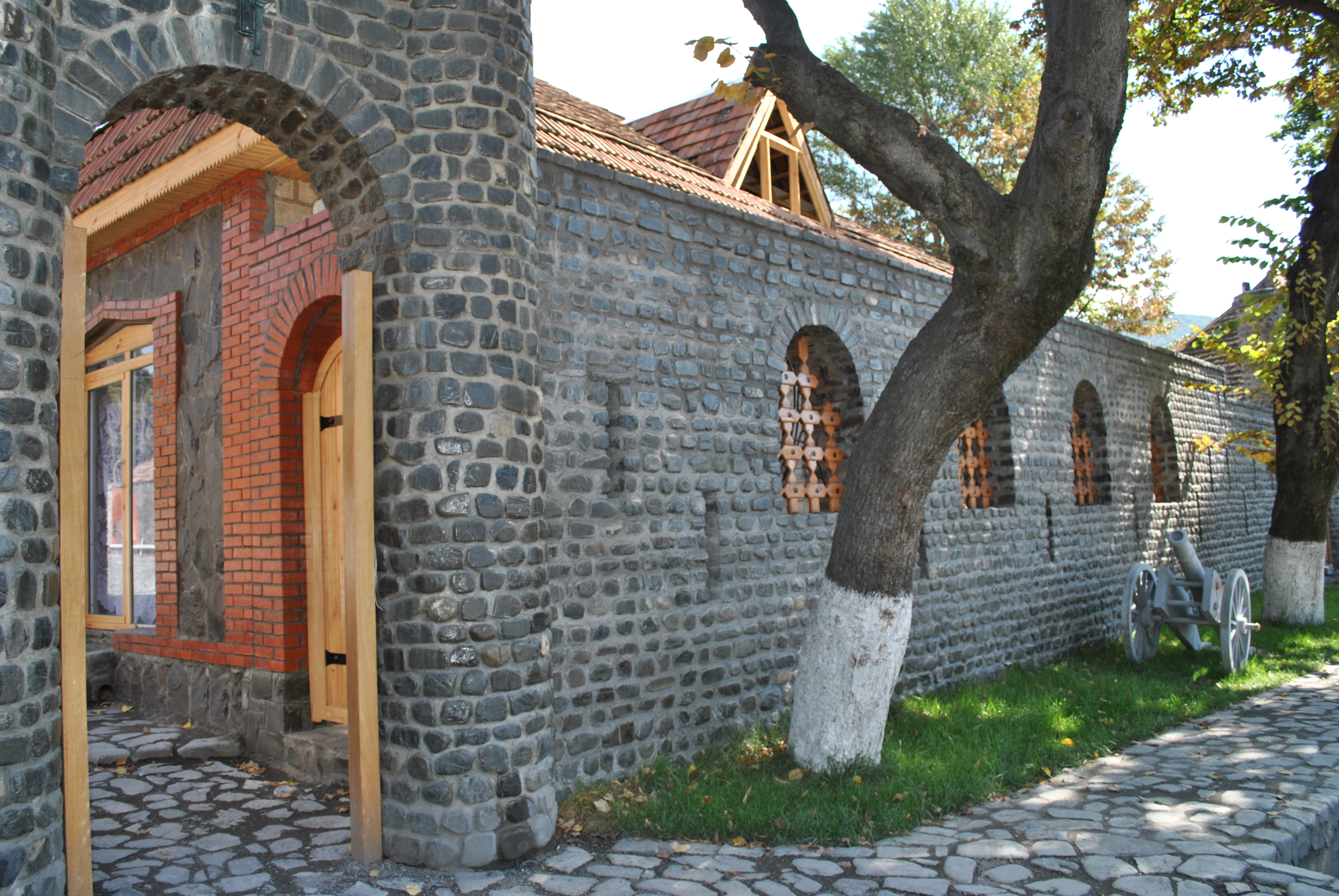
Icheri Bazar street, Entrance 2

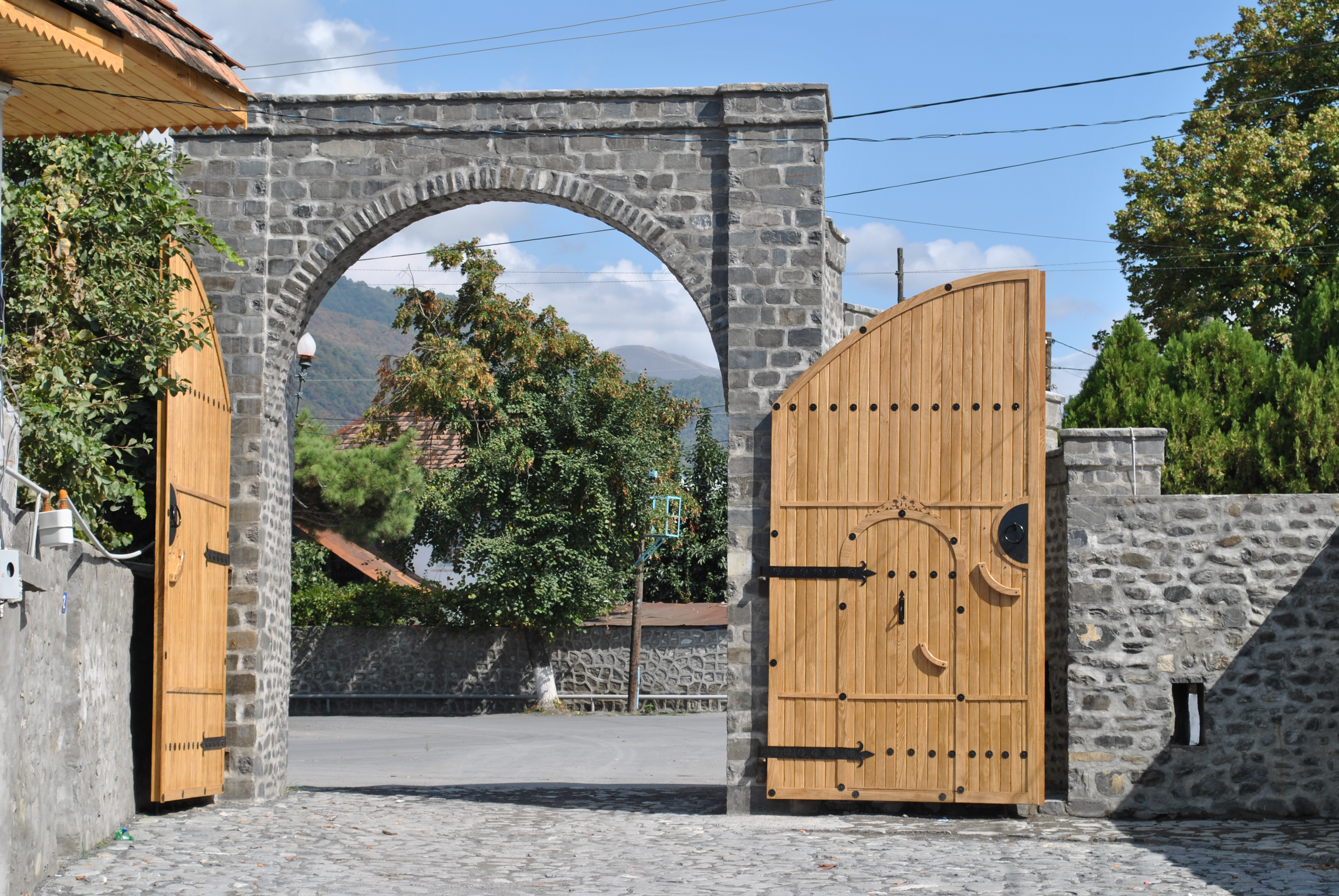
Icheri Bazar street

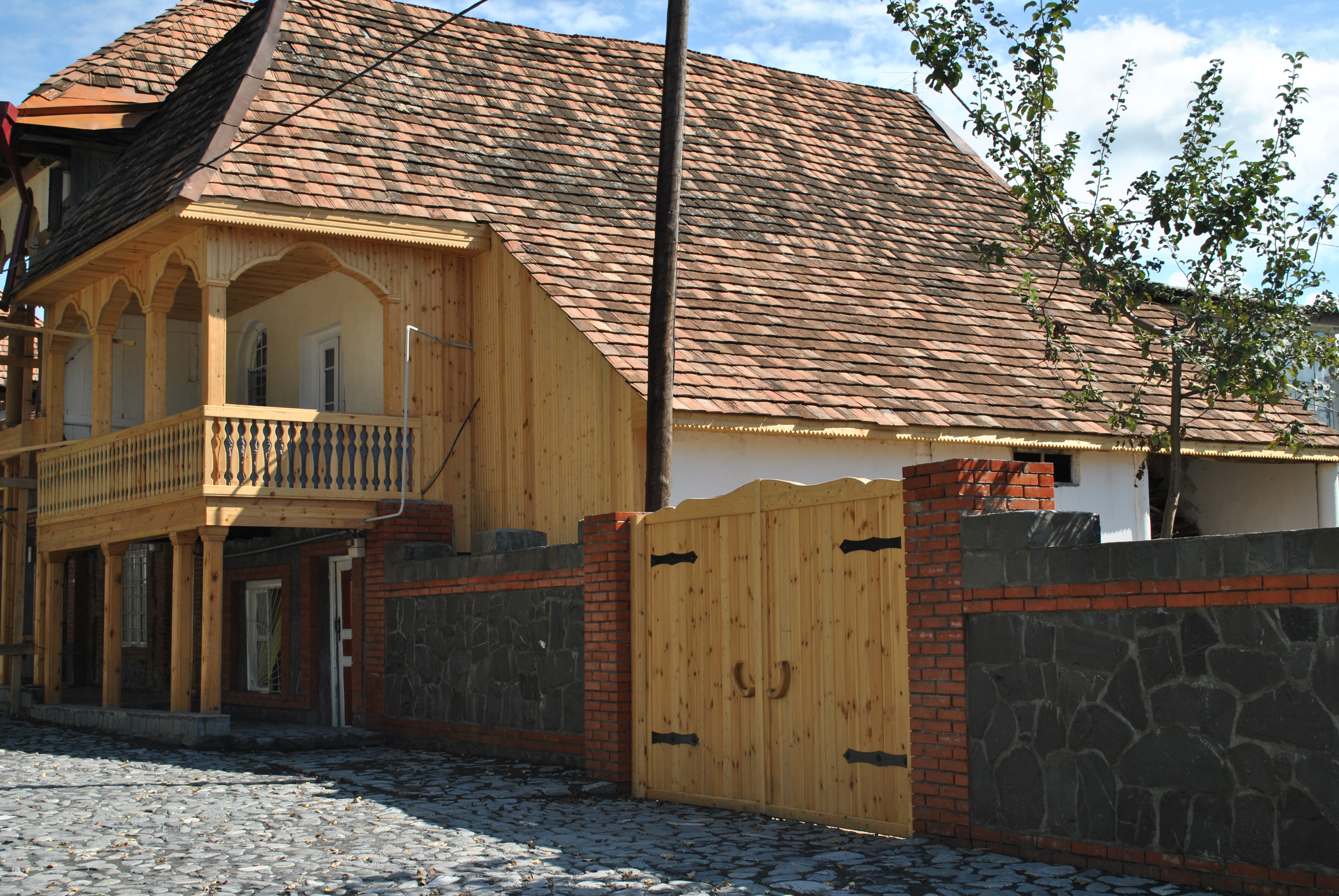
Icheri Bazar (Qakh Fortress Wall)

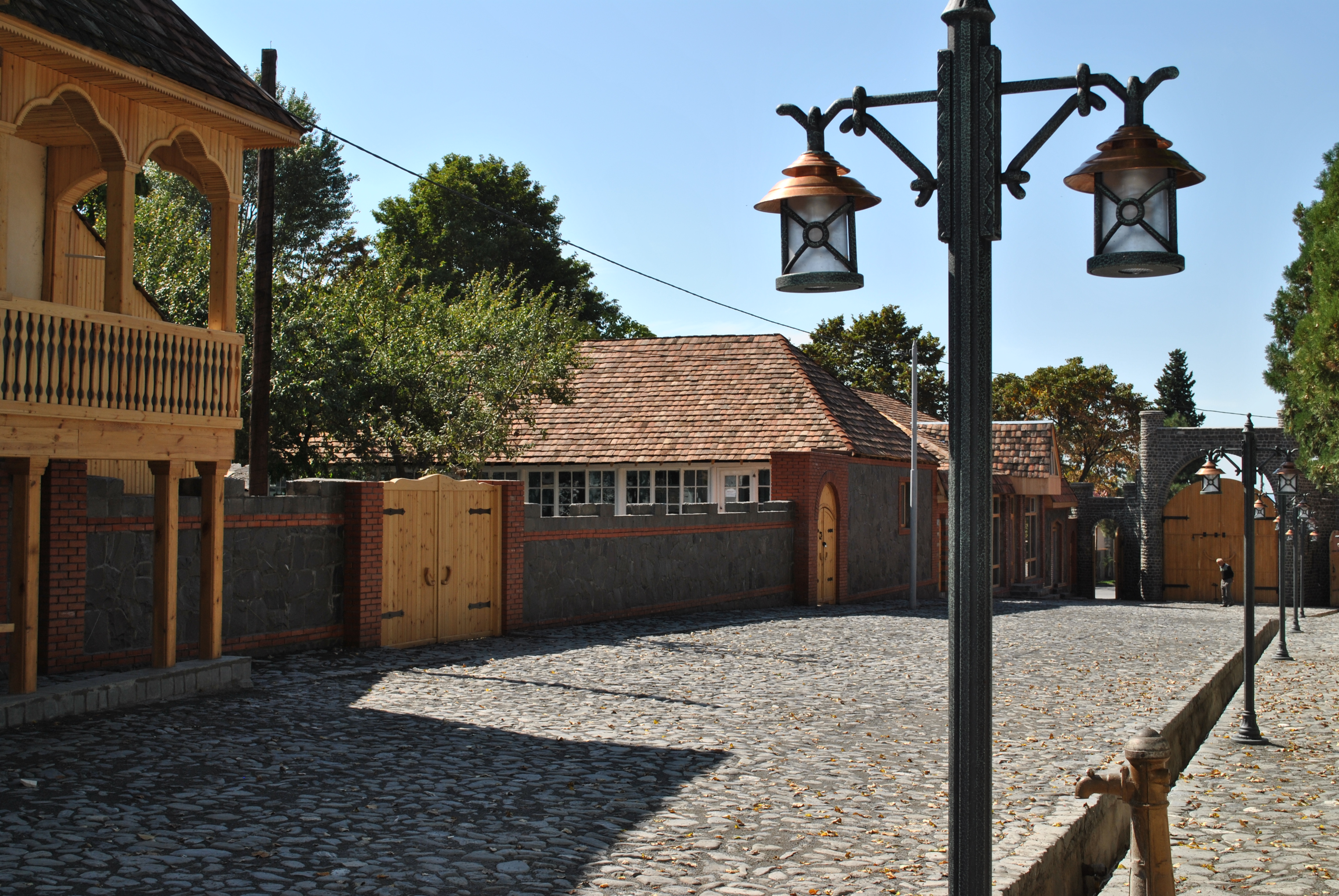

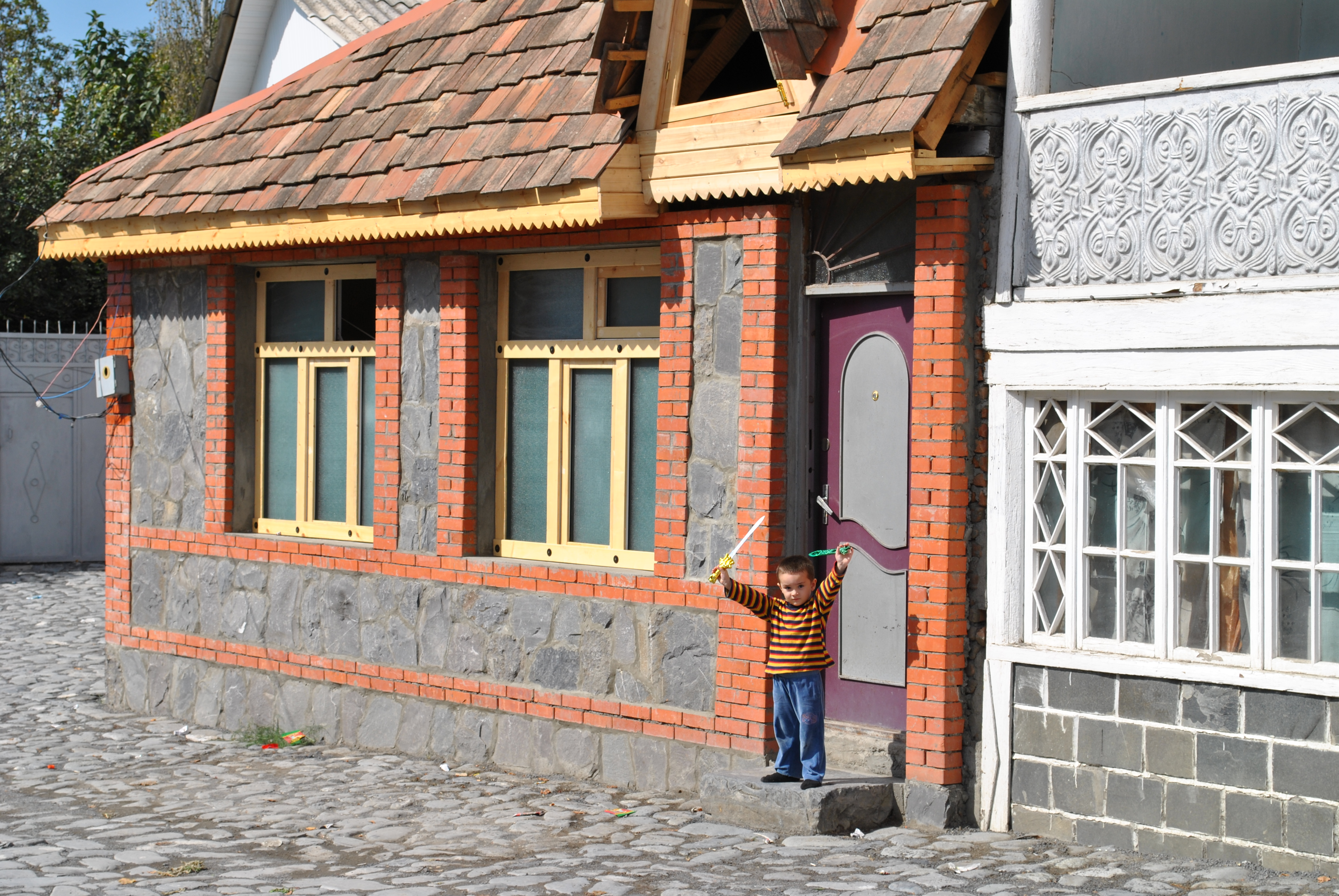

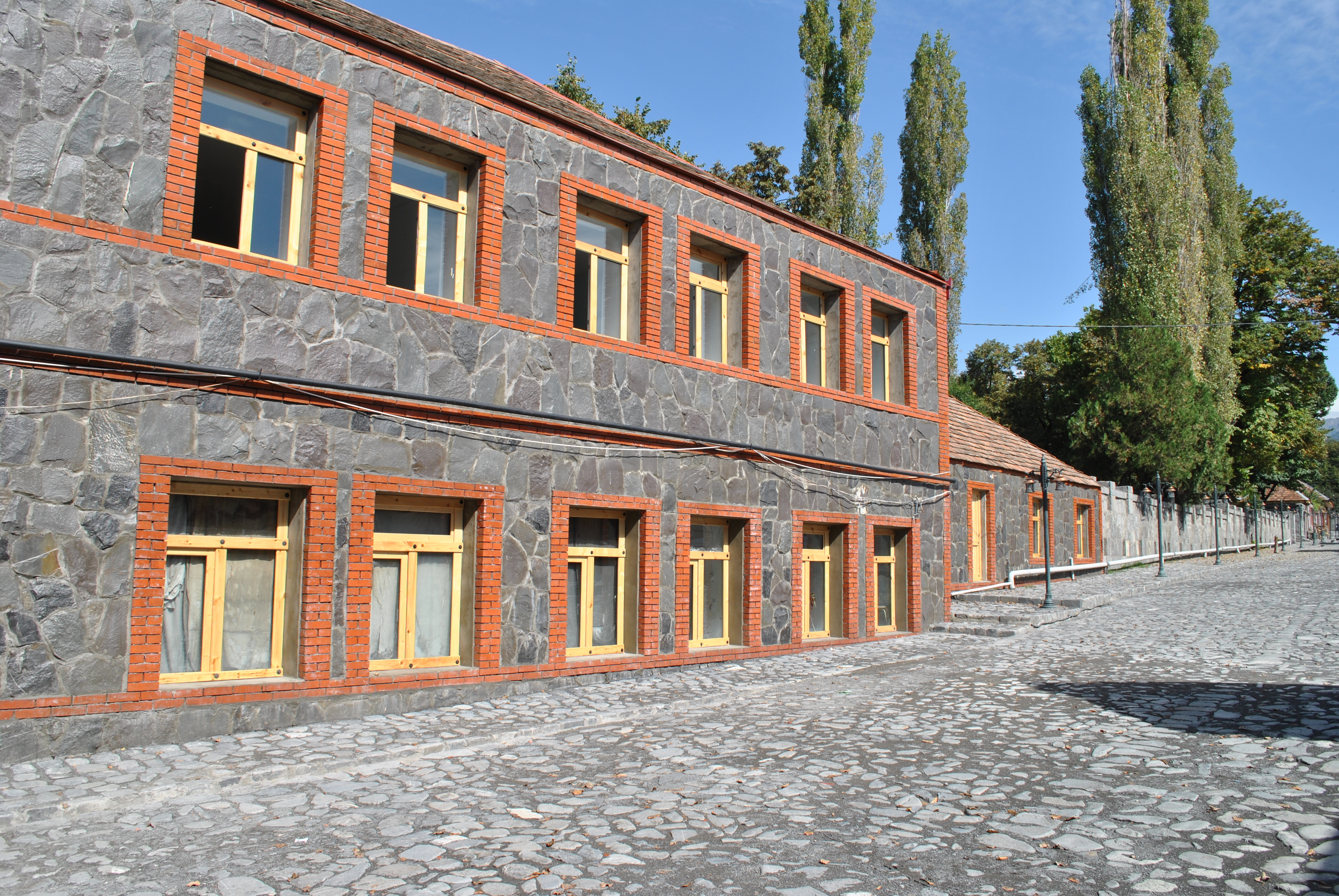

== See also ==
Qakh (city)
