= İlisu =

- Municipality
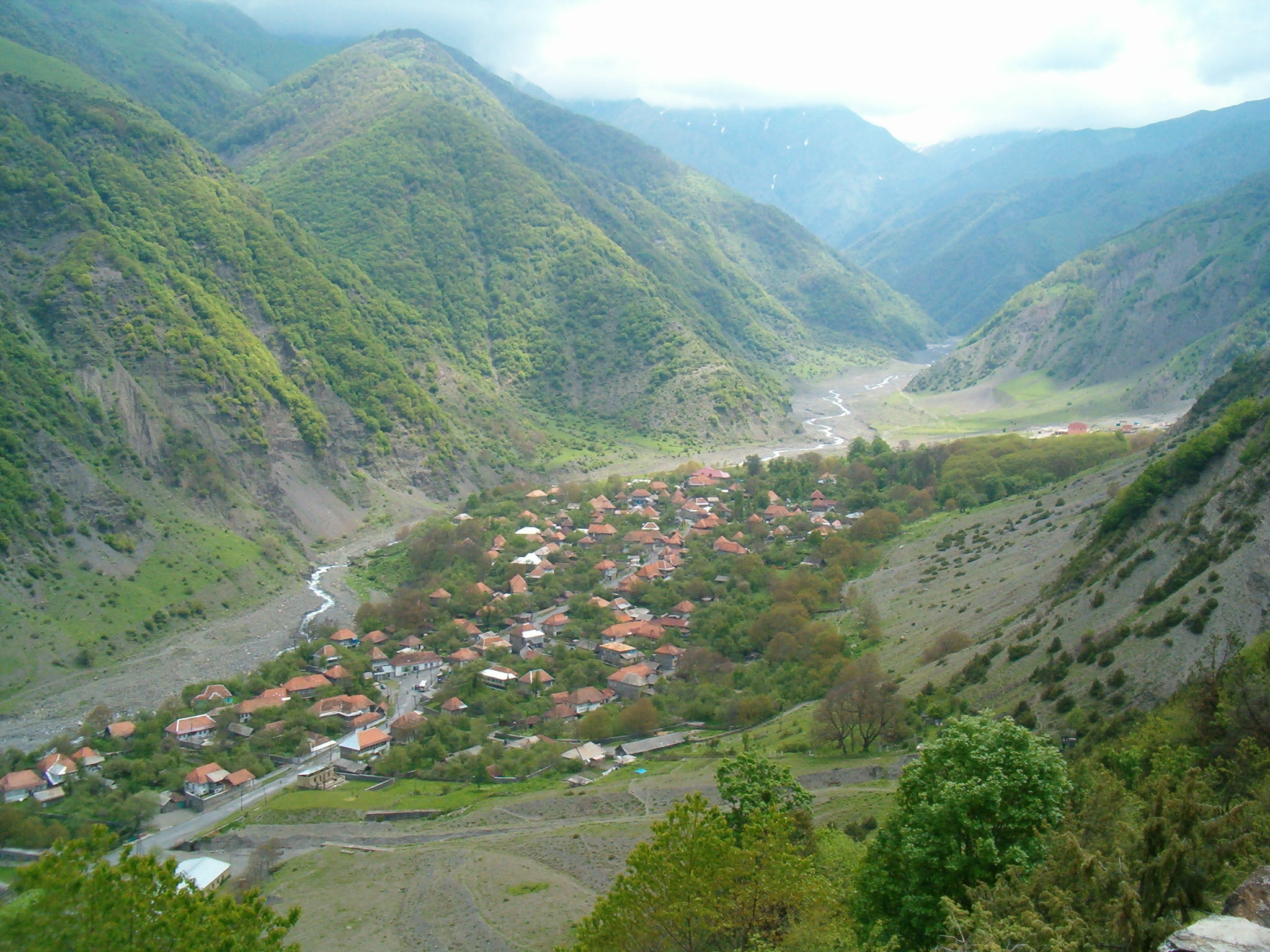

- Location within Azerbaijan Location within Shaki-Zagatala Economic Region
- Coordinates: 41°28′06″N 47°03′24″E
- Country: Azerbaijan
- District: Qakh

Population (2009)
  - Total: 1,349
- Time zone: UTC+4 (AZT)

İlisu is a village and municipality in the Qakh District of Azerbaijan. It has a population of 1,370. It was the capital of the Elisu Sultanate. The postal code is AZ 3417.

== Reserve ==
Ilisu State Nature Reserve was established on February 20, 1987, by decree number 57, with an area of 9345 ha. It is located on the south side of the Greater Caucasus (Gakh), between Zagatala and Ismayilli Reserve, at an altitude of 700–2100 metres. The area was expanded by the decree of the Cabinet of Ministers of the Azerbaijan Republic dated March 31. Now its area is 17381.6 ha.

== History ==
The history of the emergence of the Ilisu Sultanate is inextricably linked with the rulers of Tsakhur. The village of Tsakhur is located on the northern slopes of the Main Caucasian Ridge and is a historical place of residence of the Tsakhurs. Since the XV century or earlier, the Tsakhur Khanate feudal entity existed here. Over time, the Tsakhurs advanced to the south and settled also in the Kakha and Jara provinces. The village of Ilisu is located on the Kurmukh-chai River, the basin of which was a special area of Tsuket.

The Ilisu Sultanate was the next stage in the development of the previously existing Tsakhur Khanate, and its history was closely linked with the history of neighboring Dzharo-Belokan free societies. The capital of the sultanate was in Ilisu (Yelisu, Elis), and the historical capital was in Tsakhur. The population mainly consisted of Tsakhurs and professed Sunni Islam; Azerbaijanis and Georgian Ingiloites also lived. In Russian sources, the Tsakhurs (people of the Lezgian group) were often referred to simply as Lezgins.

== See also ==
- Galacha
- Jinli Castle

== Gallery ==
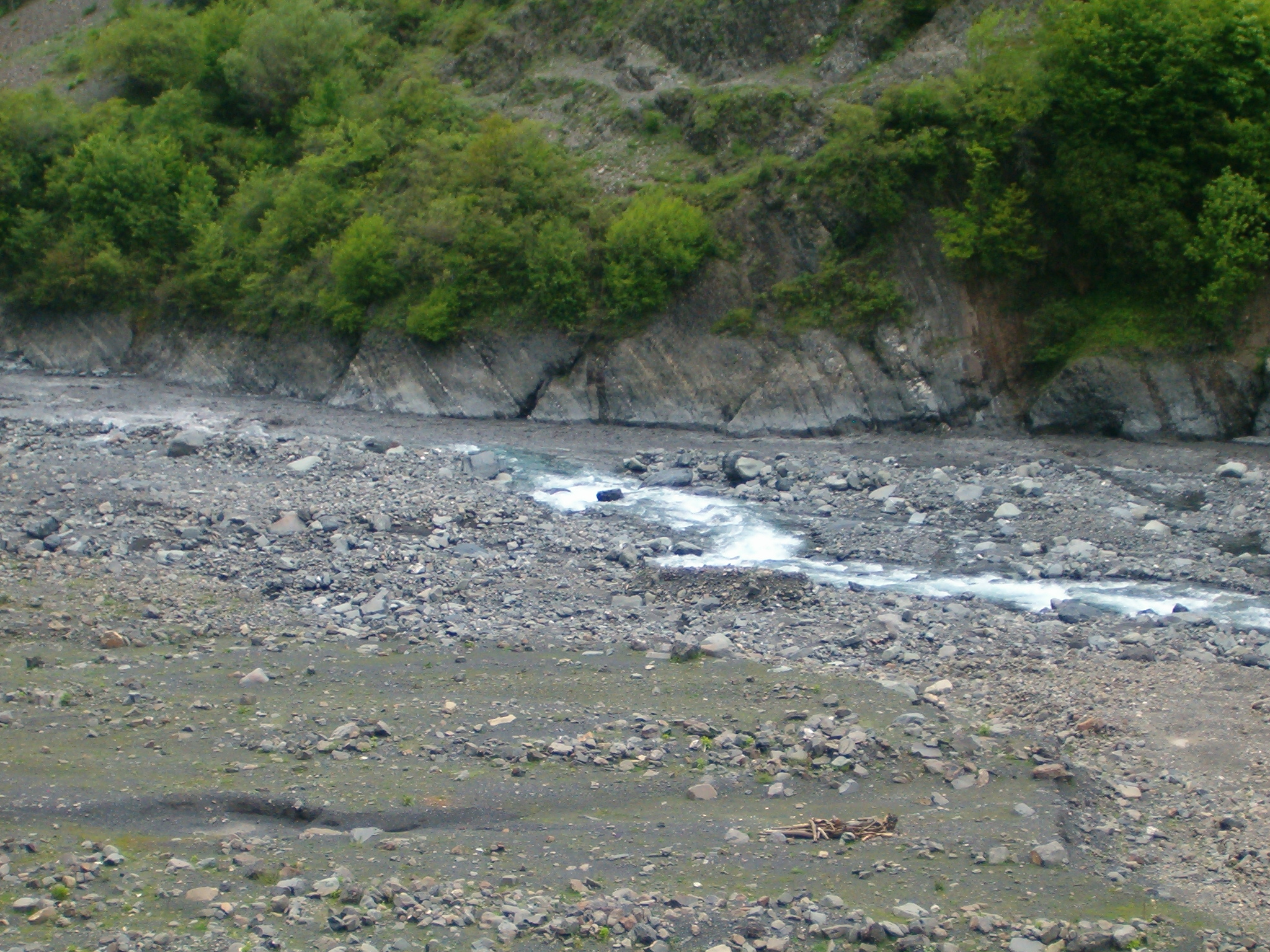

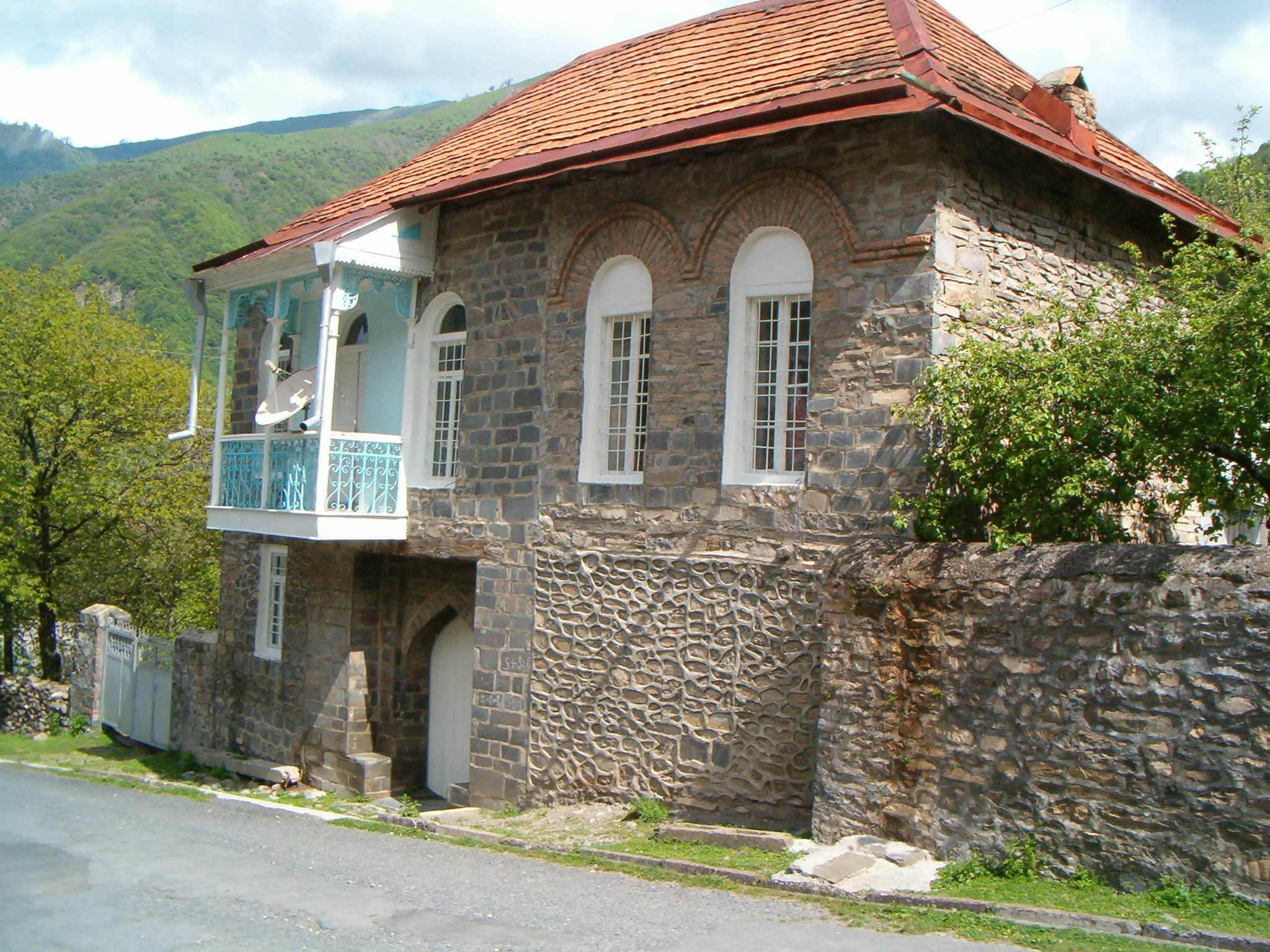

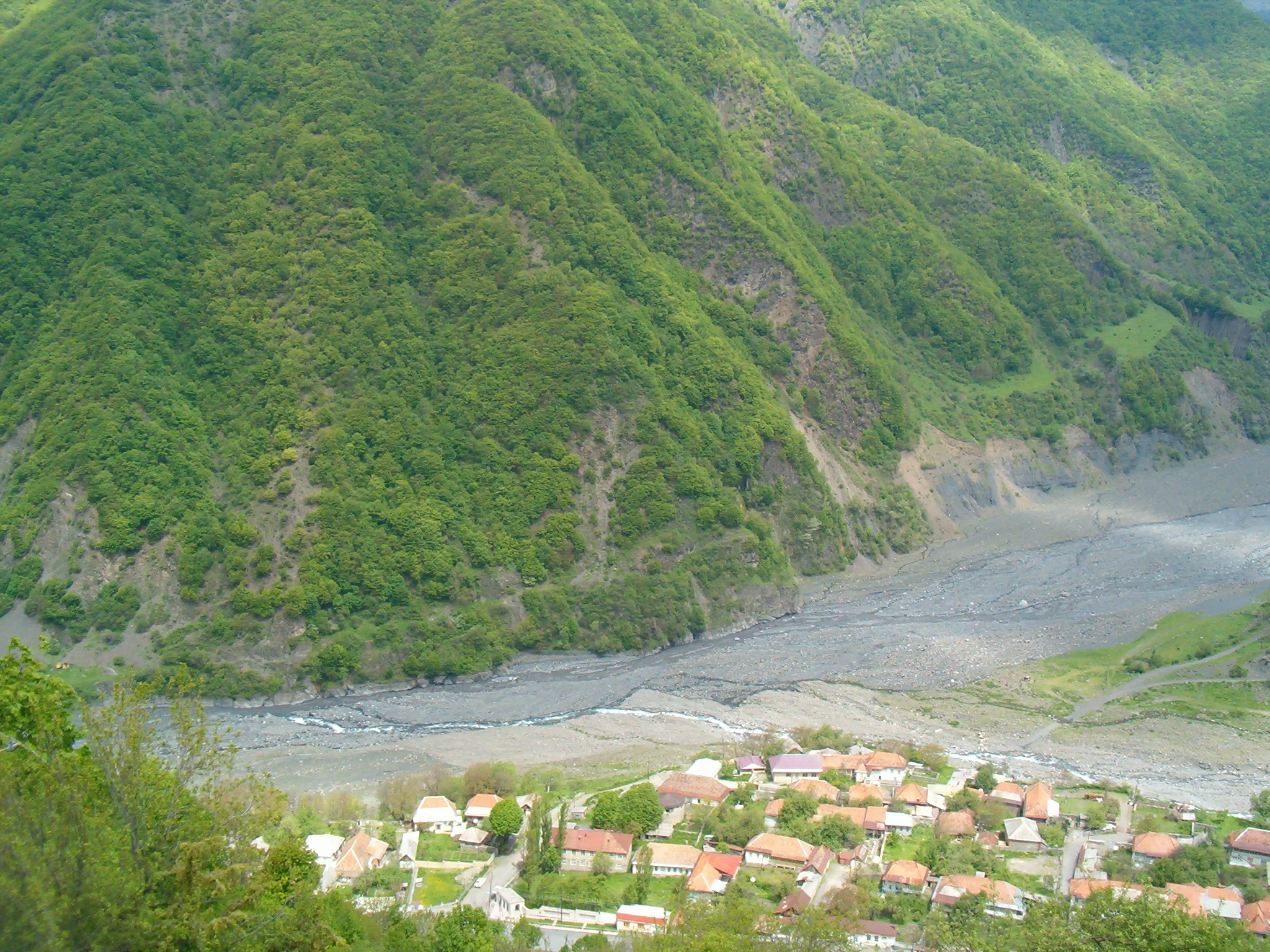

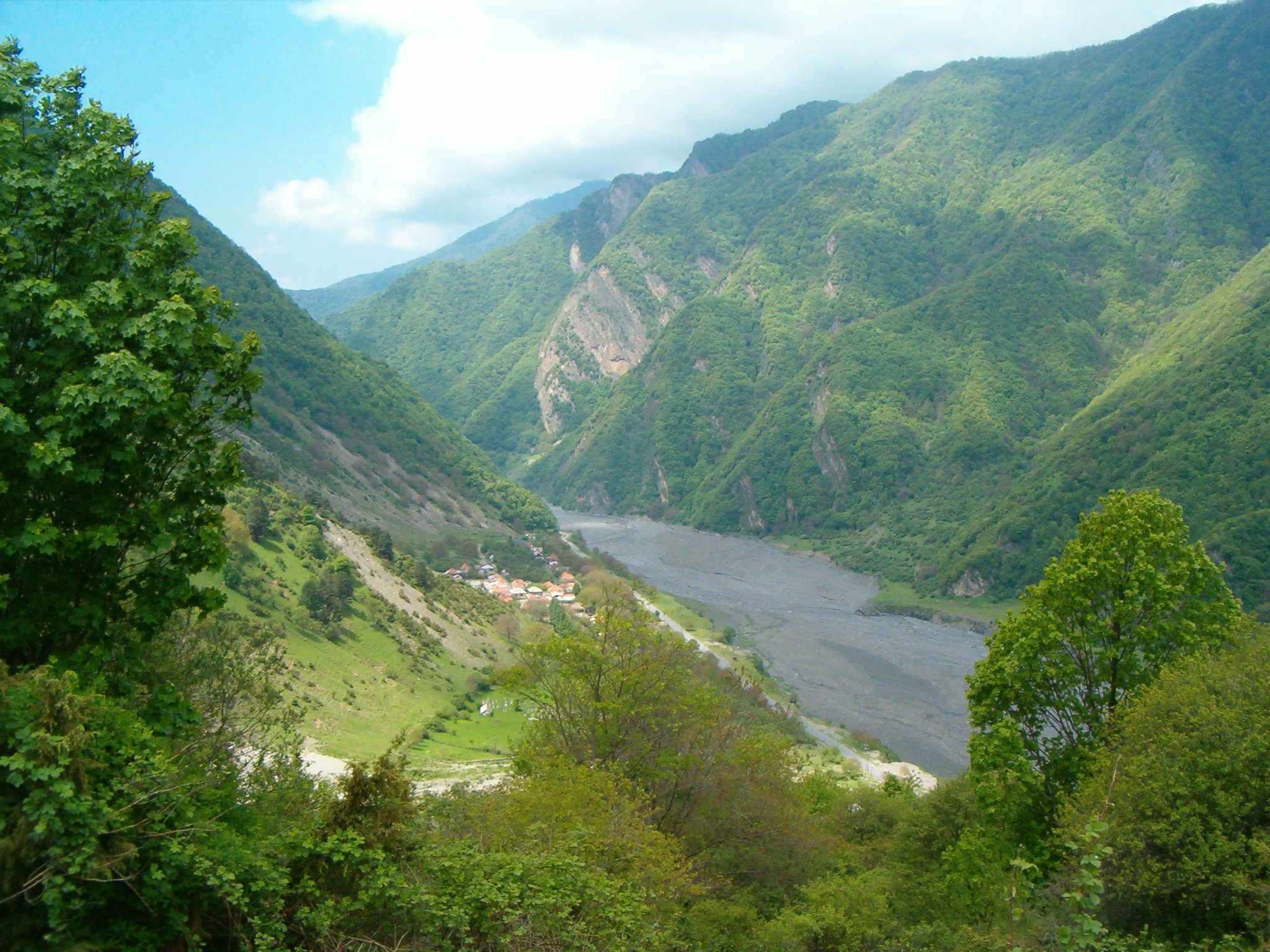

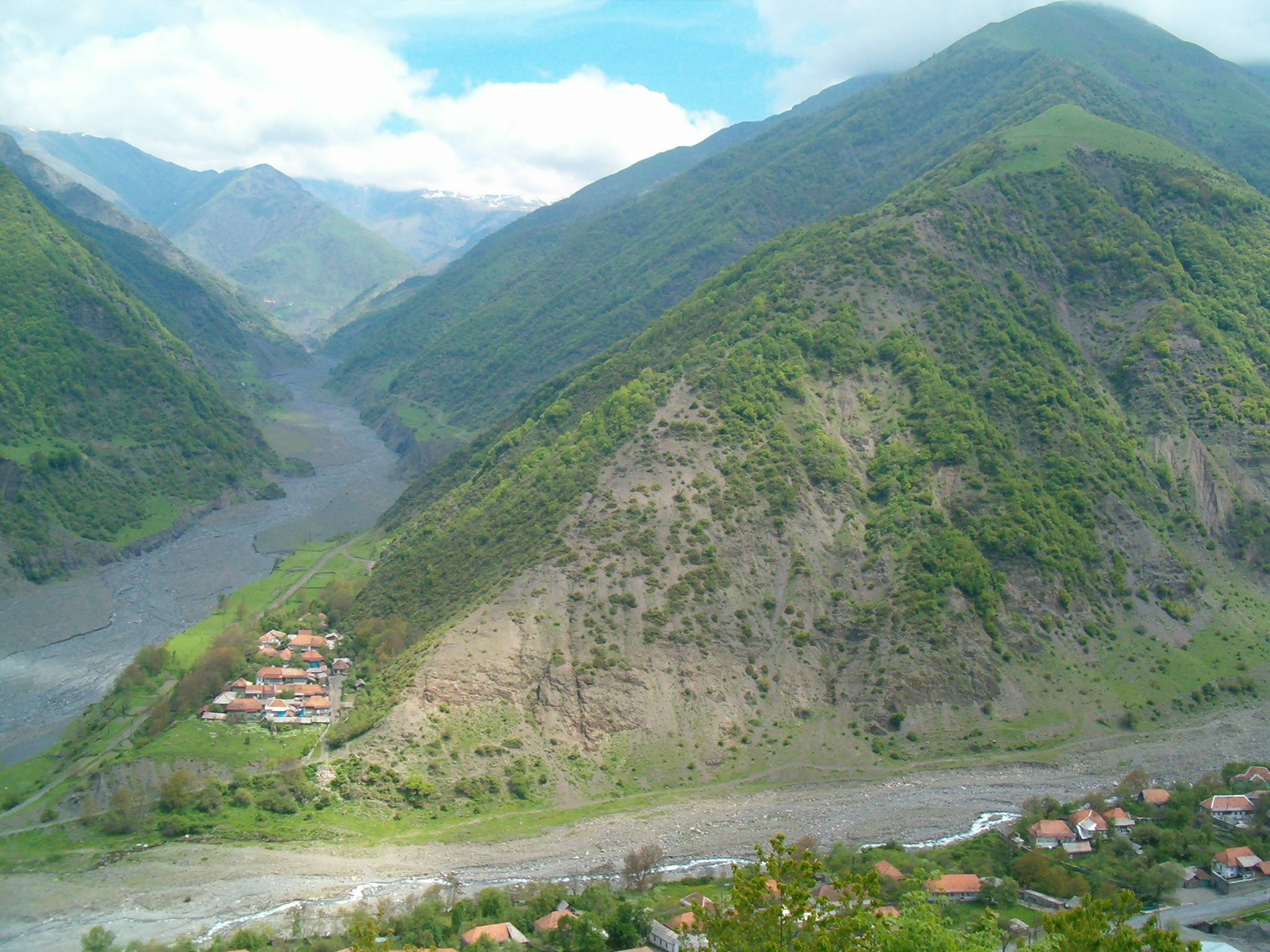

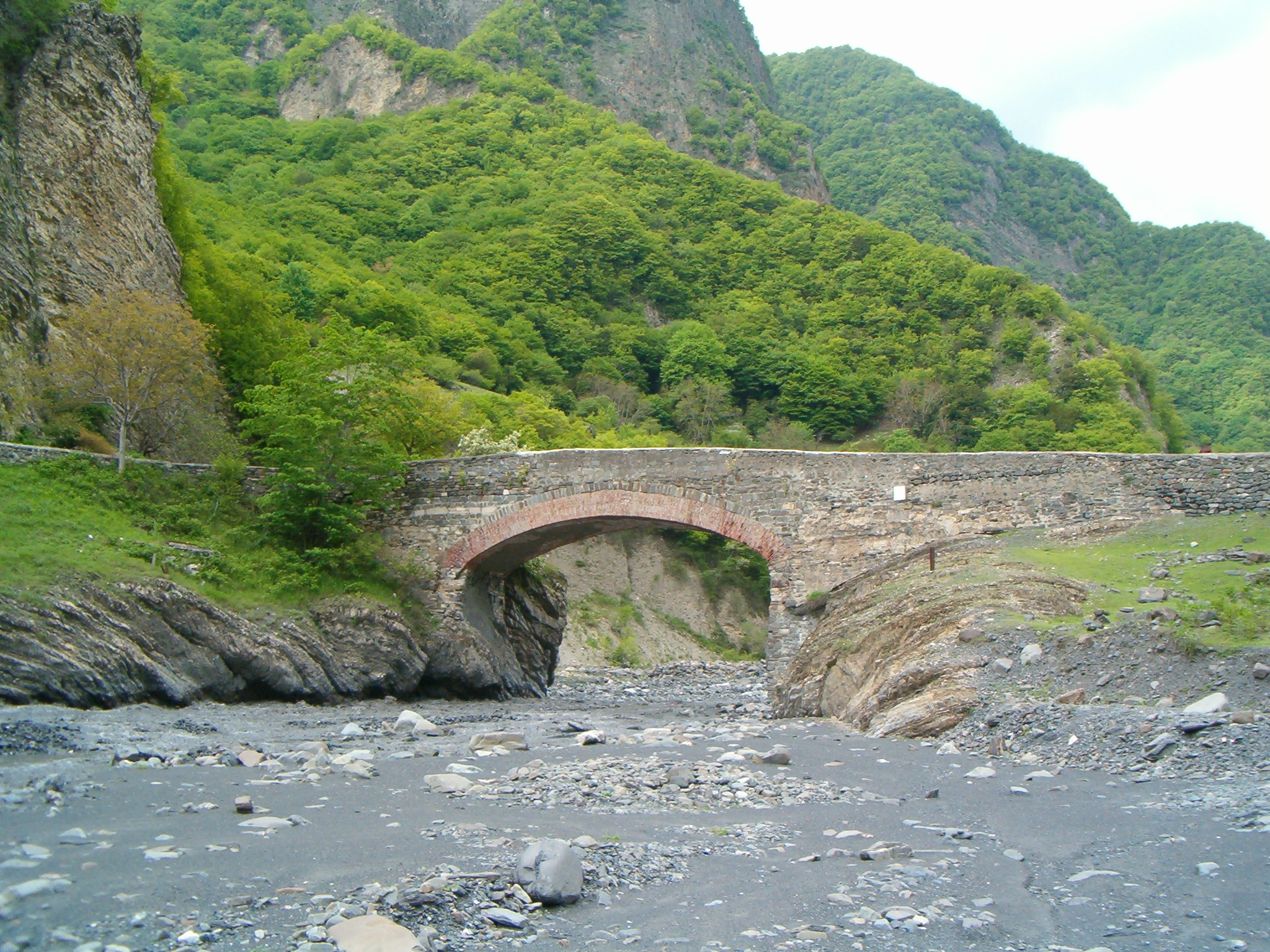

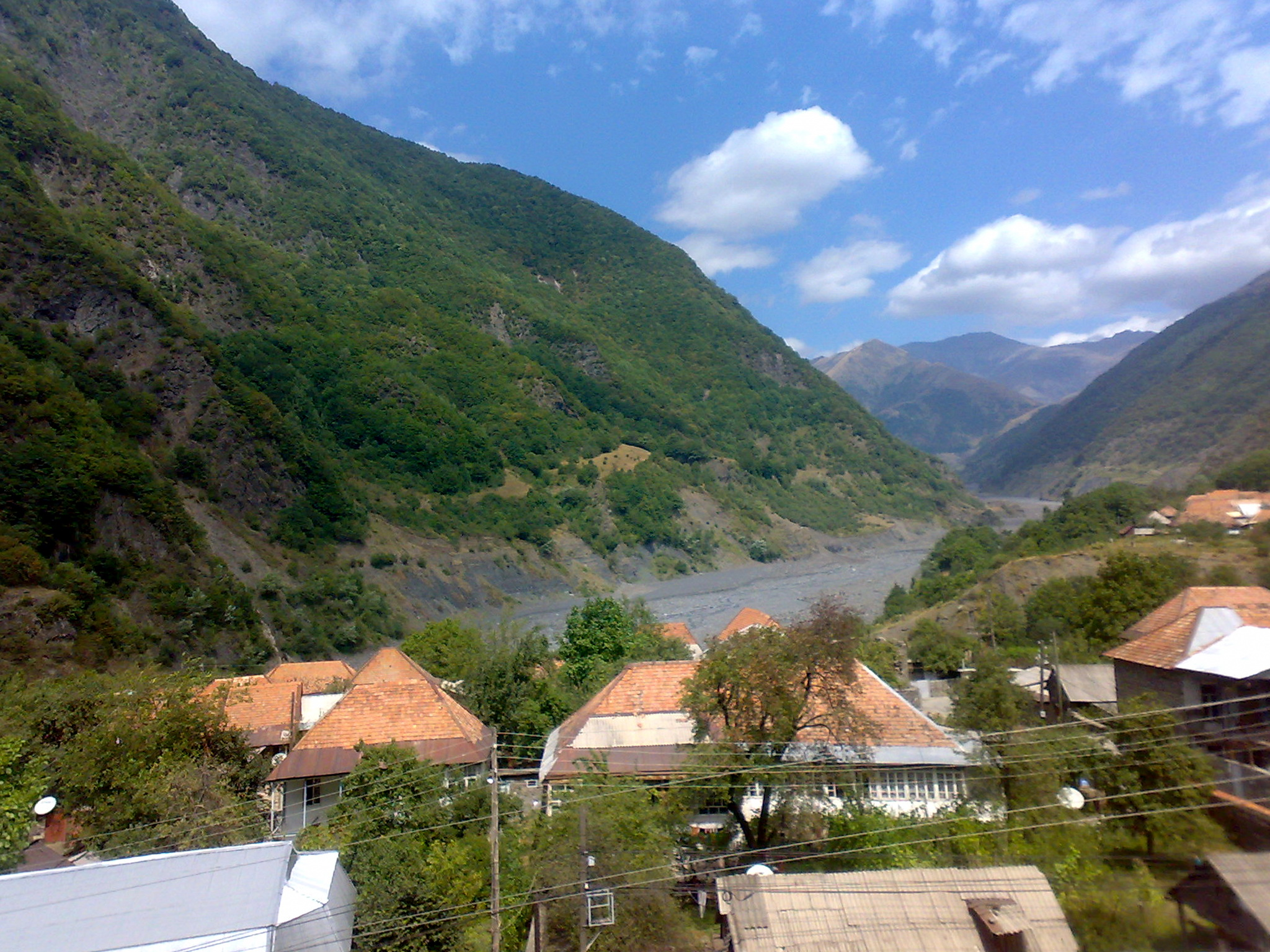

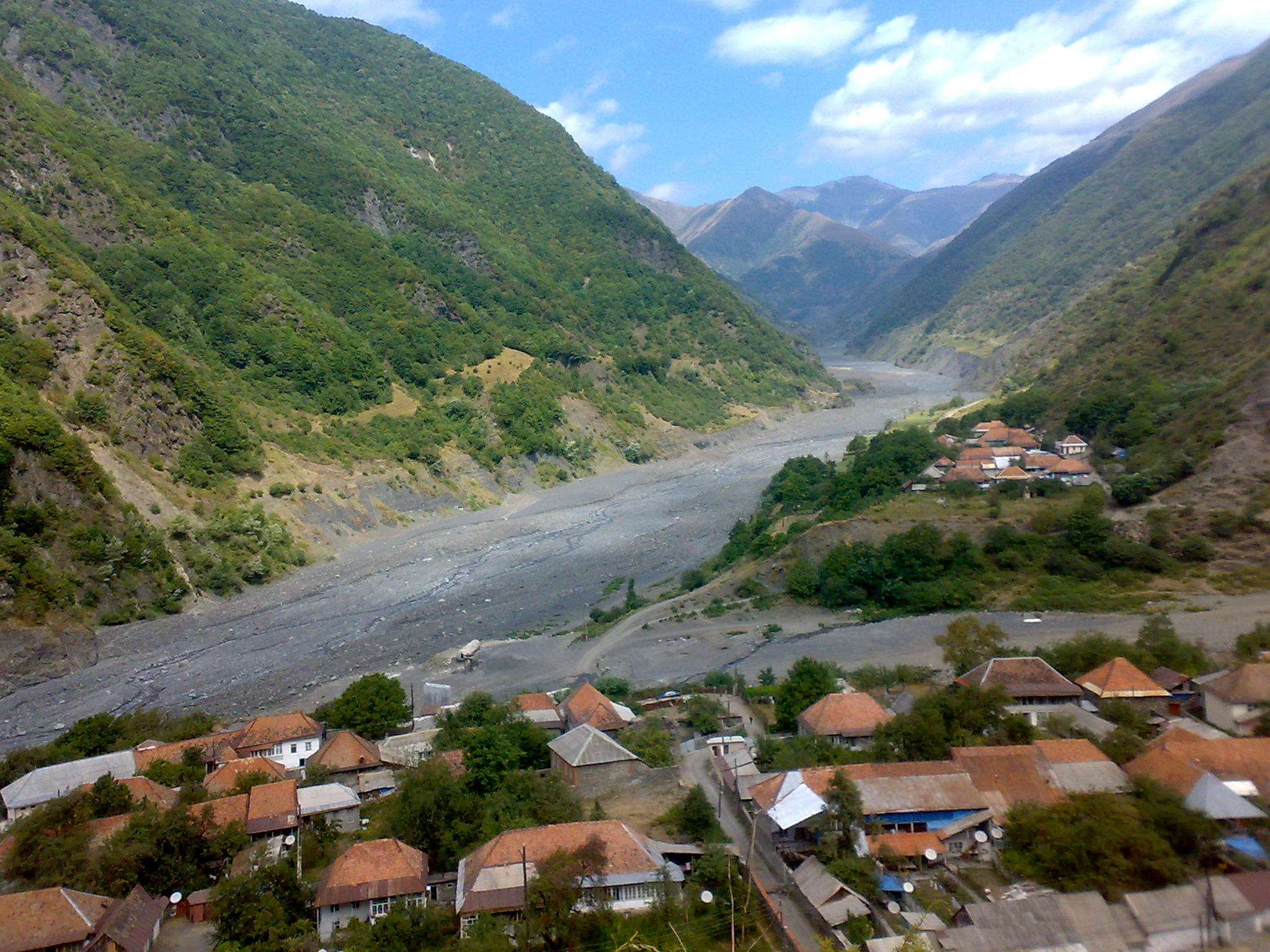
