= Samukh District =

District in northwestern Azerbaijan

Coordinates: 40°49′57″N 46°30′35″E

- District
- Map of Azerbaijan showing Samukh District
- Country: Azerbaijan
- Region: Ganja-Dashkasan
- Established: 28 February 1992
- Capital: Samukh
- Settlements: 35

Government
  - Governor: Ali Gojayev

Area
  - Total: 1,450 km^{2} (560 sq mi)

Population (2020)
  - Total: 58,800
  - Density: 40.6/km^{2} (105/sq mi)
- Time zone: UTC+4 (AZT)
- Postal code: 5100
- Website: samux-ih.gov.az

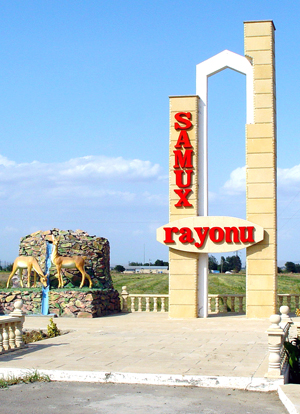
Road sign at the entrance to Samukh District

Samukh District (Azerbaijani: Samux rayonu) is one of the 66 districts of Azerbaijan. It is located in the north-west of the country and belongs to the Ganja-Dashkasan Economic Region. The district borders the districts of Goranboy, Goygol, Shamkir, Tovuz, Qakh, Yevlakh, city of Ganja and the Kakheti region of Georgia. Its capital and largest city is Samukh. As of 2020, the district had a population of 58,800. The northwest section of Mingachevir reservoir is in this district.

== History ==
The name "Samukh" comes from a Caucasian Albanian word for 'Forest Hunting Place'. A related term, Samonis, is used to mark this area on Ptolemy's 2nd-century BC map of the Caucasus. There are Bronze Age burial mounds around Samux Town.

As an administrative unit, an entity known as Samukh Rayon was formed in 1930, centred on Garachayly settlement. However, in 1954, the construction of Mingechevir Hydro Power Plant rendered the region impractical as an administrative unit and Samukh Rayon was abolished, its territory thereafter falling within an expanded Safaraliyev Rayon. Safaraliyev Rayon had itself been detached from the Ganjabasar on January 24, 1940, by Decree No.11 of the Supreme Soviet of the Azerbaijan SSR. In 1959, Safaraliyev Rayon was itself abolished. However, after Azerbaijan's independence, the entity was recreated albeit under the name Samukh Rayon according to Decree No.72 of National Soviet of the Supreme Soviet of Azerbaijan on February 18, 1992. Its administrative center, Safaraliyev settlement, was renamed Nəbiağalı on December 31, 1992, then renamed again as Samux during 2008.

== Population ==
By the beginning of 2017, the population of the region was 57.1 thousand, of which 21.4 thousand were urban population and 35.5 thousand were rural population. In 2018, total population increased by 0.6 thousand people and was 57,7. By the beginning of 2018, 28.9 thousand or 49.6% of the total population are men and 28.8 thousand or 50.4% are women.

The population of district by the year (at the beginning of the year, thsd. persons)
District	2000	2001	2002	2003	2004	2005	2006	2007	2008	2009	2010	2011	2012	2013	2014	2015	2016	2017	2018	2019	2020	2021
Samukh region	49,9	50,2	50,4	50,7	50,9	51,4	51,9	52,4	52,8	53,6	54,0	54,6	55,0	55,6	56,3	55,6	56,4	57,1	57,7	58,3	58,8	59,2
urban population	12,4	12,9	13,3	13,7	17,9	18,4	18,8	19,3	19,7	20,3	20,5	20,7	20,8	21,1	21,3	20,6	21,0	21,4	21,6	21,9	22,1	22,3
rural population	37,5	37,3	37,1	37,0	33,0	33,0	33,1	33,1	33,1	33,3	33,5	33,9	34,2	34,5	35,0	35,0	35,4	35,7	36,1	36,4	36,7	36,9

Also, 1860 refugees are displaced in the region. Census states that 97.88 percent of the population are Azerbaijanis, 0.07-Russians, 0.54-Turkish, 1.40-Kurds and the remaining belong to other ethnic groups.

== Geography ==
There are such rare trees as Eldar pear and Gum-tree, which grow right on rocks, not saline lands. The tree grows only on an area of 392 hectares in Samukh. The Eldar pine-tree emits a lot of oxygen, therefore, it is good for those suffering from asthma.

== Historical monuments and heritage ==
Many famous kurgans are found in Samukh. They belong to Bronze/Stone ages. Also, there is a famous natural monuments-old trees the age of which can be more than a millennium (1000 years). One of the trees has been named as Düldül, in honor of Imam Ali's horse. One of the historical sightseeing of the region includes the Imamzadeh Tomb (8th century), the height of this tower reaches 12m and “Koroglu Tower”.

Other exhibits can be found in the Heydar Aliev Center built in 2007. Center consists of 12 cultural houses, 14 clubs, 34 libraries, and 3 children's music schools.

== National reservation ==
Eldar Pine State Reserve was created to protect the endemic Pinus brutia trees.

== Main sectors of region ==
Samukh region has a well developed first sector (farming). This region is fertile for grains, livestock, and fruit growing. There are over 200 greenhouses, which cover 61.3 hectares of regions area. Over 5 000 000 kg of fruits and vegetables are cultivated and imported to former soviet union countries (now known as CIS)

Also, factories and agro entities are built in this area. Such as: "AQRO DAIRY" Limited Liability Company, "Boz mountain" livestock complex, "Ulduz 2011" LLC, "Garabagh Region MKT" LLC, "Region Agro" LLC.
