= Cəlayir =

Calair refers to:

- Calair (airline), German charter airline (1970–1972)

Cəlayir (Jalayir) may refer to:

- Cəlayir, Agsu, Azerbaijan
- Cəlayir, Jalilabad, Azerbaijan
- Cəlayir, Qakh, Azerbaijan
