= Ağyazı =

Ağyazı (also, Aghyazi) may refer to:

- Ağyazı, Qakh, Azerbaijan
- Ağyazı, Shaki, Azerbaijan
- Ağyazı Buduq, Khachmaz, Azerbaycan
