= Köhnə Xudat =

Köhnə Xudat or Khoudat-Baza or Kegiakhudat or Kegnakhudaf or Kekhna-Khudat or Këgna Khudat or Kegnakhudat may refer to:

- Köhnə Xudat Qazmalar, Azerbaijan
- Köhnə Xudat, Khachmaz, Azerbaijan
- Köhnə Xudat, Qusar, Azerbaijan
