= Kazmalar =

Kazmalar may refer to:

- Kazmalar, Khachmaz, Azerbaijan
- Qazmalar, Azerbaijan
- Köhnə Xudat Qazmalar, Azerbaijan
