= Alatəmir =

Alatəmir or Alatemur or Alatemir or Alateymur may refer to:

- Böyük Alatəmir, Azerbaijan
- Kiçik Alatəmir, Azerbaijan
- Alateymur, Iran
