= Əmirxanlı =

Əmirxanlı may refer to:

- Əmirxanlı, Shabran, Azerbaijan
  - Aşağı Əmirxanlı, Azerbaijan
- Əmirxanlı, Zangilan, Azerbaijan
