= Mammad Mammadov =

Azerbaijani Red Army senior sergeant (1920–1945)

Mammad Jabrail oglu Mammadov
- Məmməd Cəbrayıl oğlu Məmmədov
- Born: 1920; Baydarlı
- Died: 24 January 1945 (aged 24–25); Rattvits, Province of Lower Silesia, Germany
- Military career
- Allegiance: Soviet Union
- Branch: Red Army
- Service years: 1940–1945
- Rank: Senior sergeant
- Unit: 373rd Rifle Division
- Conflicts: World War II; Vistula-Oder Offensive
- Awards: Hero of the Soviet Union

Mammad Jabrail oglu Mammadov (Azerbaijani: Məmməd Cəbrayıl oğlu Məmmədov; 1920 – 24 January 1945) was an Azerbaijani Red Army Senior Sergeant and a Hero of the Soviet Union. Mammadov was posthumously awarded the title on 10 April 1945 for his actions during the Vistula–Oder Offensive, during which he reportedly killed 40 German soldiers while surrounded.

== Early life ==
Mammadov was born in 1920 in Baydarlı to a peasant family. After receiving seven years of education he graduated from the Nukha teacher training college in 1939. He worked in Almalı as a secondary school teacher. Mammadov was drafted into the Red Army on 10 October 1940.

== World War II ==
Mammadov fought in World War II from June 1941. He became a medic in the 1st Company of the 1235th Rifle Regiment in the 373rd Rifle Division. On 31 August 1944 he was awarded the Medal "For Courage" for his actions. In January 1945, he fought in the Vistula–Oder Offensive. During the capture of Namslau Mammadov evacuated four seriously wounded soldiers from the battlefield. On 24 January, during the crossing of the Oder near Breslau in the Rattvits area, Mammadov reportedly evacuated sixteen soldiers and his commander. During a German counterattack, he reportedly took up defensive positions in a house on the left bank of the river, firing three carbines taken from the wounded. Mammadov was surrounded and reportedly killed 40 German soldiers. He was killed in this action. Mammadov's actions were credited with enabling his unit to advance. Mammadov was buried in Rattvits. On 10 April 1945 he was awarded the title Hero of the Soviet Union and the Order of Lenin.

A street in Qakh was named for Mammadov, as well as a Sovkhoz in Qakh District.
