= Daniyal Sultan =

Nobleman

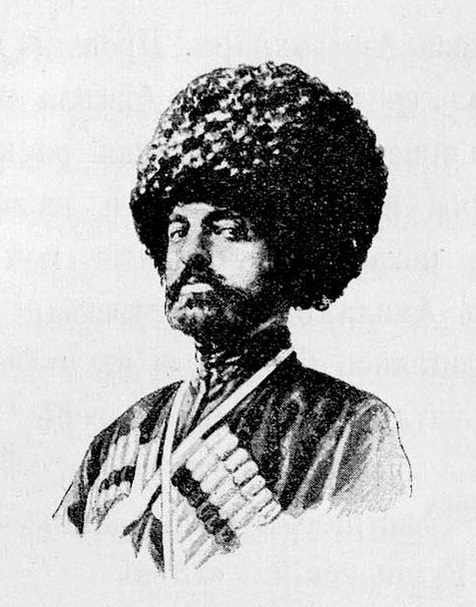
- Portrait of Daniyal Sultan by Giorgio Corradini (1810-1891)

Sultan of Elisu
- Coat of arms: Nationality
- Reign: 1831 - 1844
- Predecessor: Musa Sultan
- Successor: Sultanate annexed
- Born: c. 1809
- Died: 23 May 1871 (aged 61–62); Istanbul, Ottoman Empire
- Buried: Karacaahmet Cemetery
- Military career
- Allegiance: Russian Empire (until 1844); Caucasian Imamate (until 1859); Ottoman Empire (after 1869)
- Rank: General-major
- Conflicts: Murid War

Daniyal Sultan or Daniyal Bek (1809, İlisu — 1871, Istanbul) was an ethnic Tsakhur nobleman. general-major of the Imperial Russian Army and of the Ottoman Army and the last ruler of the Elisu Sultanate. He is best known to be a naib (viceroy), relative and member of the close circle of Imam Shamil.

== Early life ==
He was born to Sultan Ahmad Khan of Elisu and his second wife, Tuti Bike, the daughter of Surkhay II of Gazikumukh c. 1809. He had four elder brothers: Imran beg, Muhammad beg, Khalil beg and Musa beg. He also had a younger half-brother, Amir Hamza. His father served as a commander of local regiment under Ivan Paskevich but soon fell ill in Tbilisi and returned to Elisu, where he died on 21 January [O.S. 9 January] 1830.

A succession crisis ensued, and the Russian authorities did not want the eldest son, Imran beg, whose mother, Shamay, was also his father's third cousin. According to Russian intelligence reports, Imran beg was deemed as weak-willed and prone to be the influence of his younger brother Muhammad beg. Moreover, his wife was a daughter of Khalid beg, a son of Surkhay II, who was a sworn enemy of Russian Empire.

The second and the third sons of the deceased sultan were born from Pari Jahan Khanum, a daughter of Bala Agha beg, a close associate of Abbas Mirza, who was arrested by Aleksey Yermolov as a rebel and kept in Metekhi Prison, which made them dismissed from the succession as well.

Musa was more favourable since his mother was a sister of Aslan Khan of Kura Khanate, a major Russian ally. In addition, Musa was also married to a daughter of Murtuzali (d. 1815), another son of Surkhay II, as well as a half-brother of Aslan, who was killed by his father. As compensation, Imran beg was granted the village of Meshebashi, and Muhammad beg received Aghatai.

== Reign ==
The reign of his full-brother Musa lasted only eight months; he was succeeded by Daniyal. Paskevich approved Daniyal with the rank of sultan on February 14, 1831 and the rank of captain in Imperial Russian Army. Daniyal soon managed to stabilise the situation both inside and outside the sultanate. Gradually, he gained significant prestige and influence in northwestern Azerbaijan and in neighbouring Dagestan.

However, his succession less smooth than he expected. His elder half-brother, Muhammad beg, assaulted Daniyal with a dagger in December 1832 in the village of Baylar, but was stopped by the blow of the latter's nuker. Another half-brother, Khalil, was robbed and killed by unknown assailants at the entrance to village of Tangyt, together with his own nuker. While their mother accused Daniyal of murder, the official investigator, Major-General Nikolai Nikolaevich Antropov found no evidence of Daniyal's guilt.

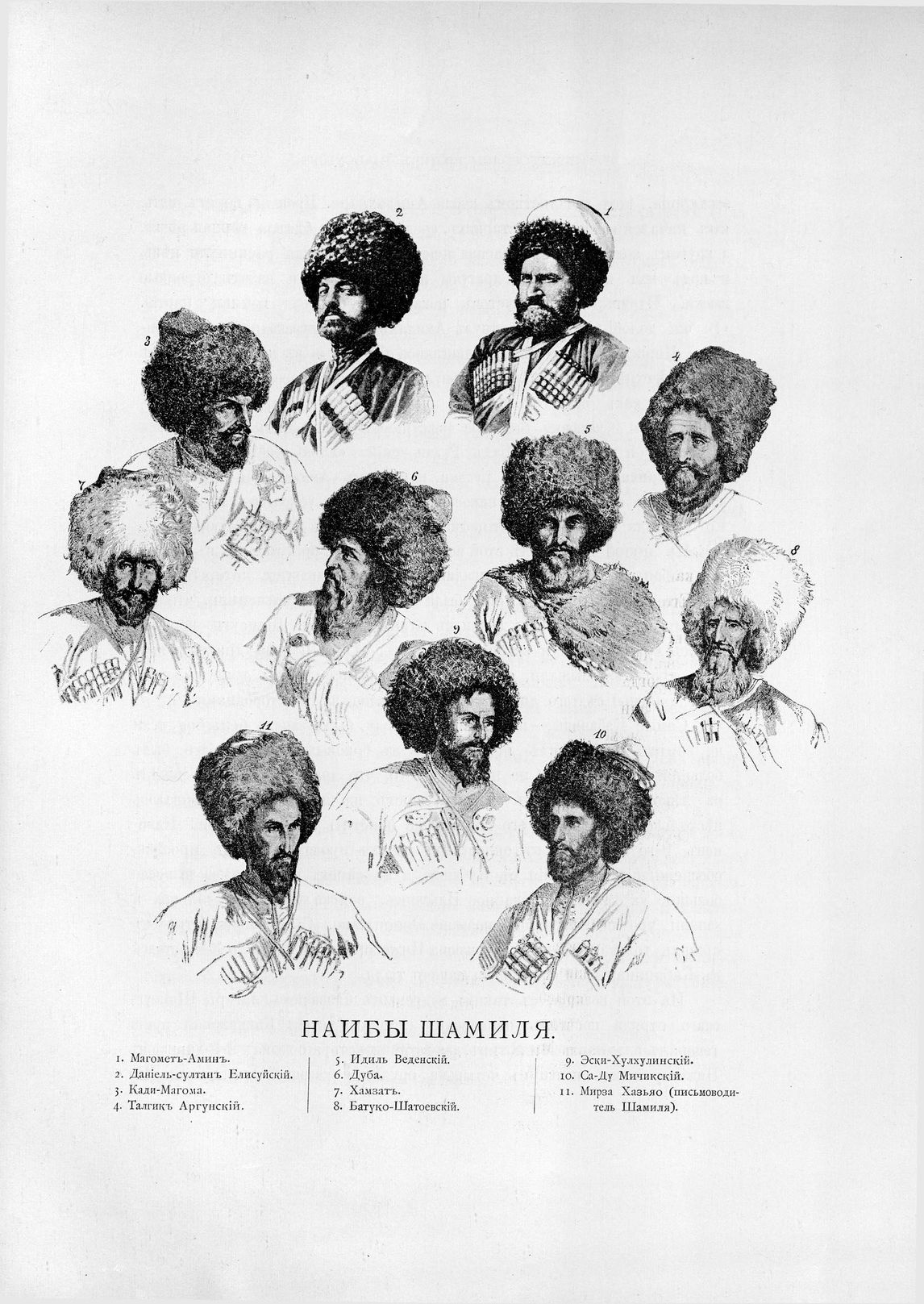
Daniyal Sultan among the naibs of Shamil

In 1832, Daniyal was granted the rank of major by the Russian authorities for resisting Hamzat Bek's invasion of Djaro. Daniyal was awarded the Order of Saint Stanislaus of the third degree for his accomplishments against the Caucasian Imamate. He rose to the rank of lieutenant-colonel in 1838. He was escorting Jamaluddin, the son of Imam Shamil. who was given as hostage to the Russians in 1839 after the Siege of Akhoulgo. According to Lesley Blanch, Daniyal advised Jamaluddin in Avar to be brave, strong and courageous and to trust his new friends. The same year, Daniyal annexed the Rutul Federation to his lands.

He received the right to wear the uniform of the Russian Imperial Guard of the Grodno Hussars and was promoted to colonel in 1840. However, as the sultan, he was subordinate to the administrator of Djaro-Belokan. The region was in 1840 included with the Georgia-Imeretia Governorate as the Belokan District, which was subdivided into three sections (Belokansky, Yeniselsky and Elisuysky), the last of which consisted of all lands of the sultanate that were under the direct control of the sultan. Two years later, the sultan became subordinate to the military district chief of the newly-formed Djaro-Belokansky District, General Grigory Schwarz, who began to restrict the sultan's rights. Daniyal did not want to go into direct relations with Schwarz and instead directly appealed to Nicholas I in 1842 to be accepted as a vassal ruler of his domains, rather than a subordinate to a Russian governor, with the same dignity as in the Principality of Mingrelia.

Still hopeful of binge granted the princely dignity, he had his militia fight for the Russian troops against the followers of Imam Shamils in Gazikumukh from March to May 1842. He was granted the rank of general-major on 18 December [O.S. 6 December] 1842 and a few days later was awarded the Order of Saint Vladimir and the Order of Saint Anna.

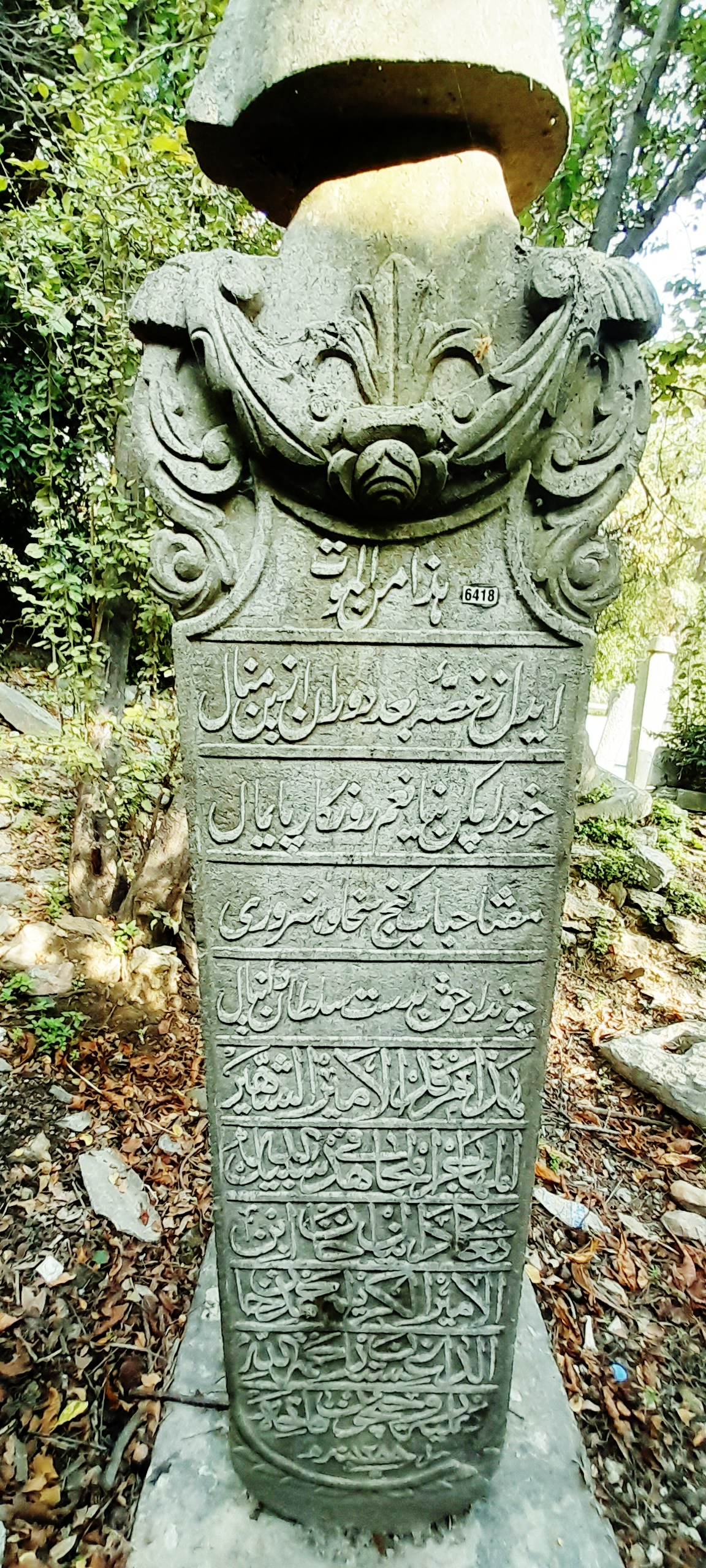
Gravestone of Danyal Sultan in Istanbul

== Under Imam Shamil ==
Schwarz's continuatal curbing of Daniyal's power finally led the Russian authorities to accuse Daniyal of swearing allegiance to his old foe Imam Shamil on 16 June 1844 and to summon him to Zaqatala for arrest. Daniyal failed to show up, which gave Schwarz a reason to march on Elisu. Daniyal was defeated near Aghatai with his 3,000-strong army on 3 July, and his capital, Elisu, was soon captured after a siege. The sultan managed to escape to the mountains, and he became Imam Shamil's naib (viceory) in the Avar village of Irib (now in Charodinsky District). Elisu was destroyed, and only the mosque remained. On August 8, the Russians annexed the sultanate to the Zakatal Okrug. According to Karl Heinrich Koch, Daniyal had been the most sincere Russian vassal by faithfully protecting the country from the raids of Tushetians and the Lezgis. Although he tried to negotiate with Mikhail Semyonovich Vorontsov in April 1845 for the return of his Russian citizenship, he could not regain his sultanate and so he rejected from the deal.

Daniyal led Imam Shamil's army in 1847 to Zaktal Okrug and recaptured Elisu on 16 May. Caught offguard, the Russians were unable to fight the guerilla in Balaken. Rumours of Haji Murad's arrival for more help to Danyal further alerted Schwarz, who demanded reinforcements. Danyal soon retreated to the mountains on 21 June. After the fall of the Gergebil fortress, Imam Shamil began a campaign in the upper reaches of the Samur River on September 17, 1848. That day, Daniyal suddenly attacked Kala. On September 25, he besieged the village of Akhty, which was the seat of the head of Samurskiy Okrug Okrug (District) of Dagestan Oblast (Region) of the Russian Empire. The neighbouring Tiffliskoe Barracks fell on September 26, and highlanders killed the entire garrison. In early October, Daniyal, Kebet Muhammad and Haji Murad settled down in Miskindzha with 7,000 fighters in order to prevent Moisei Argutinsky from coming to the aid of Akhty's defenders, who were still holding out. However, the Russians managed to break through and to approach the fortress, and Imam Shamil retreated into the mountains.

The Russians launched an offensive against Tabasaransky District in July 1849. To divert them, Daniyal attacked Kumukh. However, the manoeuvre, like others that were undertaken by Shamil, did not distract the Russians, led by Argutinsky, from entering the Tabasaransky District. Daniyal joined Imam Shamil's delegation in March 1853 to be sent to Constantinople to convince the Ottoman Empire to start the Crimean War as early as possible. Daniyal battled the Russian forces on September 12. Imam Shamil's siege of Zakatala Fortress on September 9 had failed, which caused him to withdraw. Danyal captured Zakatala in October. Of the 5,000 Russian soldiers present, 3,000 were wounded or died. The rest escaped since they realised that resistance was impossible they had fought for 36 hours. When Daniyal turned towards Shirvan and captured Signakh and Sheki, in the region, General Grigol Orbeliani asked some of the Russian soldiers in Crimea, Abkhazia and Anapa to reinforce the Tbilisi front.

In April 1859, the Russian troops captured Imam Shamil's capital, the village of Vedeno, and the last pockets of resistance in the territory of Chechnya were suppressed. Imam Shamil and his supporters went to the Dagestan village of Gunib. On August 2, Daniyal surrendered his residence in Irib and the village of Dusrek to Baron Alexander von Wrangel. On August 7, he went with a confession to Prince Aleksandr Baryatinsky, who granted him a full amnesty.

== Last years ==
After Imam Shamil's defeat, his full submission was obtained with Daniyal acting as a mediator. Daniyal lived in Tbilisi for a while. His former rank of general-major was returned with his enrollment in the army cavalry and in the Caucasian Army on September 25, 1861. He resigned from the military service on 11 May [O.S. 29 April] 1869. He arrived in Constantinople in June and visited Sultan Abdulaziz.

Daniyal died in Constantinople on 23 May 1871 and was buried in Karacaahmet Cemetery. Twelve books belonging to him are currently kept in Princeton University Library.

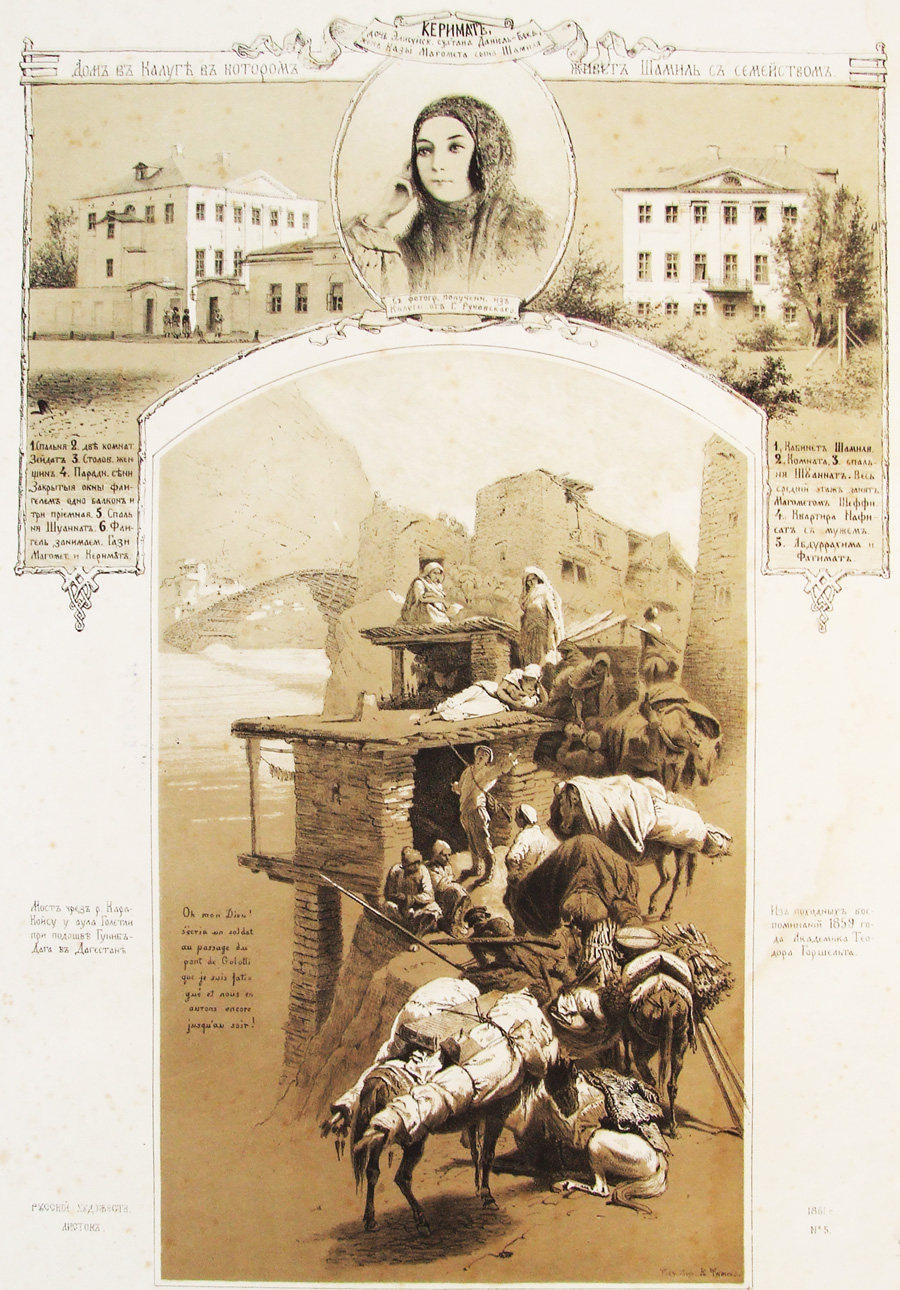
Russian lithograph with Kerimat, Daniel's daughter on it, 1861

== Family ==
He had at least three wives with numerous offsprings:

- Baba Bike, daughter of Ahmad III of Mehtuli Khanate
  1. Musa bey (b. 1843) — married to Ummu Khanum (b. 1849), daughter of Aghakishi beg Khodjanov
    - Mahmud agha (b. 1866)
    - Bike (b. 1868)
  2. Nene Khanum — married to Abdurrahman bey (grandson of Tahir bey, brother of Aslan Khan of Kura), later married to Muhammad bey, son of colonel Haji Agha bey
    - Murtuzali Khan (b. 1855)
    - Ummu Gulsum (b. 1858)
  3. Begüm Bike (b. 1839) — married to Makhay bey (b. 1839), son of Yusuf bey (himself a descendant of Elisu sultans)
    - Humay Sultan (b. 1856)
    - Yusuf bey (b. 1860)
    - Omar bey (b. 1864)
    - Abbas bey (b. 1866)
  4. Kerimat Bike (d. 1862, Nukha) — m. 1851 to Gazi Muhammad, son of Imam Shamil
  5. Ummu Bike (died in infancy)
- Juvai Rade (b. 1844)
- Bala Khanum — daughter of Haji Abdulqadir Khan of Shaki

== Sources ==
- Gammer, Moshe (2013). Muslim Resistance to the Tsar: Shamil and the Conquest of Chechnia and Daghestan. Routledge. ISBN 9781135308988.
