= Üzümlü (disambiguation) =

Üzümlü is a Turkish place name and it may refer to:

- Üzümlü, a district of Erzincan Province, Turkey
- Üzümlü, Bayramiç
- Üzümlü, Dicle
- Üzümlü, Ergani
- Üzümlü, a village in Kaş district of Antalya Province, Turkey
- Üzümlü, a village in Şavşat district of Artvin Province, Turkey
- Üzümlü, a village in Germencik district of Aydın Province, Turkey
- Üzümlü, a village in Erdemli district of Mersin Province, Turkey
- Üzümlü, a village in the municipality of Əmirxanlı in the Davachi Rayon of Azerbaijan
- Üzümlü, a village in Gölpazarı district of Bilecik Province, Turkey
- Üzümlü, Azerbaijan
- Üzümlükənd
