= Dəymədağlı =

Dəymədağlı or Daymadagly or Deymedagyly may refer to:

- Dəymədağlı, Oghuz, Azerbaijan
- Dəymədağlı, Qakh, Azerbaijan
