= Qarabaldır =

Qarabaldır or Karabaldyr may refer to:

- Qarabaldır, Oghuz, Azerbaijan
- Qarabaldır, Qakh, Azerbaijan
