= Seven Church monastery complex =

Church in Qakh Rayon, Azerbaijan

"Seven Church" monastery complex Yeddi Kilsə monastır kompleksi
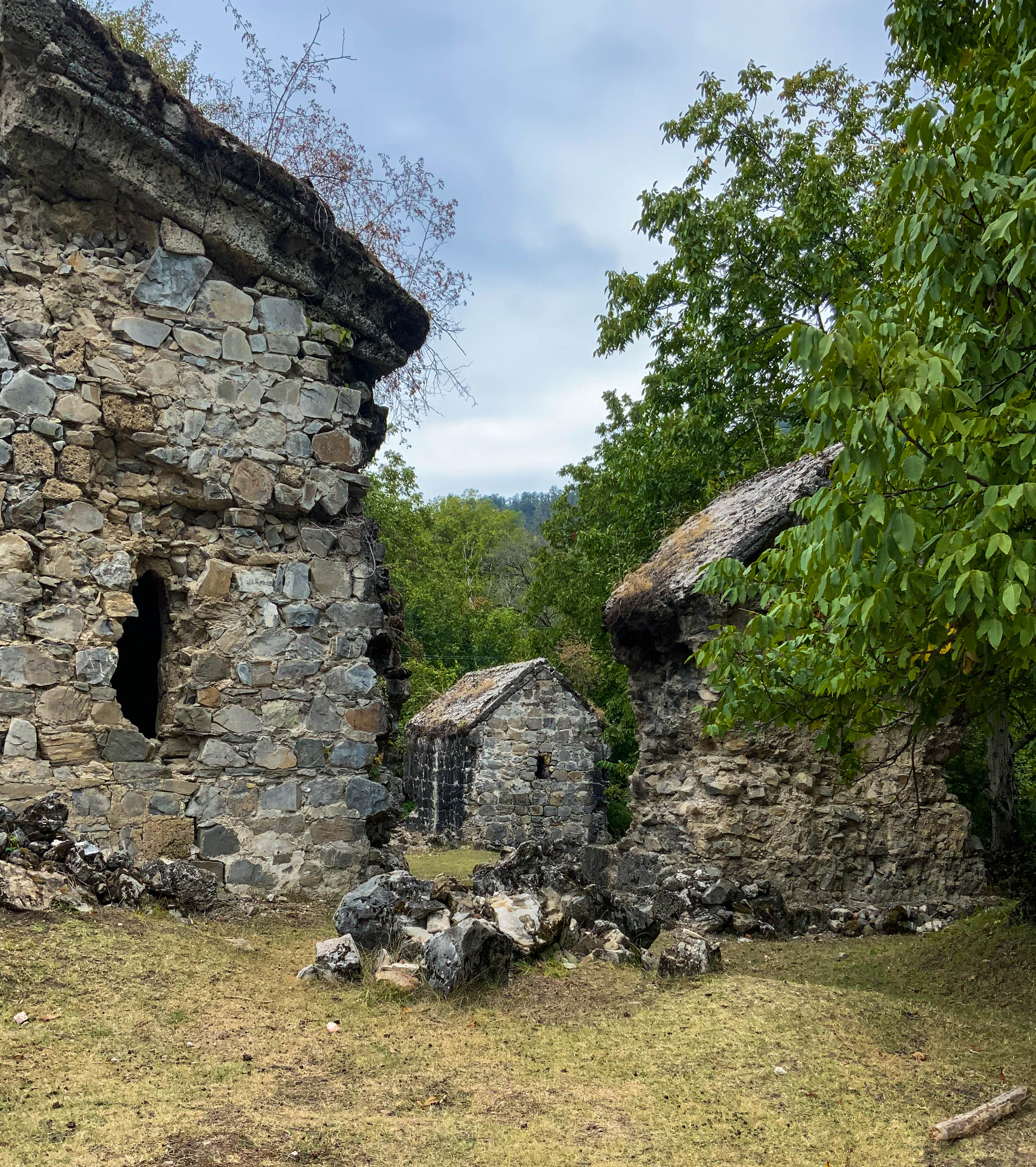
- The church of St. Thaddeius of the Seven Church monastery (established in the 5th or 6th century)

- Location within Azerbaijan

Religion
- Affiliation: Church of Caucasian Albania

Location
- Location: near Ləkit Kötüklü, Qakh Rayon, Azerbaijan
- Coordinates: 41.515278°N 46.878333°E

Architecture
- Style: Azerbaijan
- Groundbreaking: 5th or 6th centuries

Seven Church monastery complex (Azerbaijani: Yeddi Kilsə monastır kompleksi) - is one of the oldest Christian monasteries in Azerbaijan and in Caucasus, and is a Caucasian Albanian Apostolic monastery located near the village of Ləkit Kötüklü in the Qakh Rayon of the Azerbaijan republic.
