= Fıstıklı =

Fıstıklı (Turkish for with nuts or place with nuts) may refer to:

- Fıstıklı, Armutlu, a village in the province of Yalova, Turkey
- Fıstıklı, Artvin, a village in the province of Artvin, Turkey
- Fıstıklı, Kahta, a village in the province of Adıyaman, Turkey
- Fıstıqlı, a village and municipality in the Qakh district of Azerbaijan
