= Baydarlı =

Baydarlı may refer to the following places:

- Baydarlı, Azerbaijan, a village in Qakh District, Azerbaijan
- Baydarlı, Turkey, a town in Tokat Province, Turkey
