= Ismayil Daghistanli =

- İsmayıl Dağıstanlı
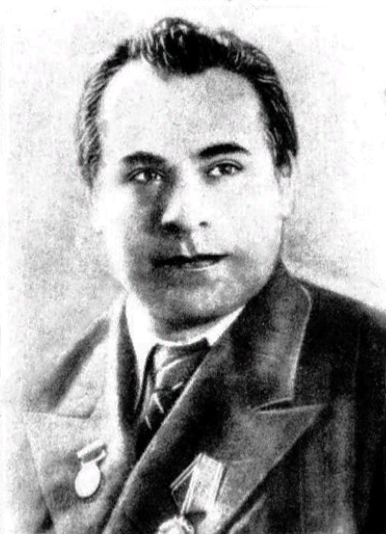
- Daghistanli in 1954
- Born: Ismayil Yusif oghlu Hajiyev; January 6, 1907; Zərnə, Caucasus Viceroyalty, Russian Empire (present-day Azerbaijan)
- Died: April 1, 1980 (aged 73); Baku, Azerbaijan, Soviet Union
- Resting place: Alley of Honor
- Education: Baku State University
- Occupations: Actor, pedagogue
- Awards: People's Artist of the Azerbaijan SSR Honored Artist of the Azerbaijan SSR State Prize of the Azerbaijan SSR

Ismayil Daghistanli (Note: Azerbaijani: İsmayıl Dağıstanlı; Rutul: Исмаил Дагестани, romanized: Ismail Dagestani; Russian: Исмаил Дагестанлы, romanized: Ismail Dagestanly) (6 January 1907 – 1 April 1980, born Ismayil Yusif oghlu Hajiyev) (Note: Azerbaijani: İsmayıl Yusif oğlu Hacıyev; Rutul: Исмаил Гаджи, romanized: Ismail Gadzhi; Russian: Исмаил Гаджиев, romanized: Ismail Gadzhiyev) was an Azerbaijani, Rutul, and Soviet stage and film actor and pedagogue. He was awarded People's Artist of the Azerbaijani SSR (1949), and People's Artist of the USSR (1974).

== Biography ==
Ismayil Daghistanli was born on 6 January 1907 in Zərnə village of Qakh District into an Rutul family. He began his stage career in 1925 in the drama society under the Nukha Central Workers 'and Peasants' Club. He studied at Baku Theater College from 1926 to 1930. From 1927, he also performed on the stage of the Drama Theater as a practitioner actor. From 1930 he worked intermittently at Azerbaijan National Drama Theatre, in 1936–1937 at Yerevan Drama Theater, and was a director and actor of the Azerbaijani theater he organized in Derbent in 1932–1933.

Since 1938, he had created a series of classic characters on the stage of Azerbaijan National Drama Theatre. He became famous on the Azerbaijani stage as the first performer of the roles of V. I. Lenin. In the last years of his life, he worked as the head of the department at Azerbaijan Institute of Arts. He had published several books about actors and theater.

Ismayil Hajiyev died on 1 April 1980 in Baku.

== Awards ==
- People's Artist of the USSR — 11 July 1974
- People's Artist of the Azerbaijan SSR — 21 July 1949
- Honored Artist of the Azerbaijan SSR — 23 April 1940
- Stalin Prize — 1948
- State Prize of the Azerbaijan SSR — 1972
- Two Orders of Lenin — 22 July 1949; 1967
- Order of the Red Banner of Labour — 1959
- Order of Friendship of Peoples — 1977
- Medal "For Valiant Labour in the Great Patriotic War 1941–1945" — 1946
- Medal "For the Defence of the Caucasus" — 1944

== Filmography ==
- Aghasadig Geraybeyli (film, 1974)
- Evening concert (film, 1948)
- Boyuk Dayag (film, 1962)
- Koroghlu (film, 1960)
- The shadows creep (film, 1958)
- Black stones (film, 1956)
- Gatir Mammad (film, 1974)
- Sabuhi (film, 1941)
- Soviet wrestler (film, 1942)
- Submarine "T-9" (film, 1943)
