= Əmircan =

Əmircan or Amircan or Amirdzhan may refer to:

- Əmircan, Baku, Azerbaijan
- Əmircan, Qakh, Azerbaijan
