= Saribas (disambiguation) =

Saribas may refer to:

- Sarıbaş, a village in Azerbaijan
- Saribas, a place in Sarawak
- Saribas (state constituency), represented in the Sarawak State Legislative Assembly
