= Bashmalakh =

- Location within Azerbaijan Location within Shaki-Zagatala Economic Region
- Coordinates: 41°23′02″N 46°58′19″E
- Country: Azerbaijan
- Rayon: Qakh
- Time zone: UTC+4 (AZT)
  - Summer (DST): UTC+5 (AZT)

Bashmalakh is a village in the Qakh Rayon of Azerbaijan.
