= Aşağı Malax =

- Municipality
- Location within Azerbaijan Location within Shaki-Zagatala Economic Region
- Coordinates: 41°22′N 46°59′E
- Country: Azerbaijan
- Rayon: Qakh

Population
  - Total: 304
- Time zone: UTC+4 (AZT)
  - Summer (DST): UTC+5 (AZT)

Aşağı Malax (also, Ashaga Malakh) is a village and municipality in the Qakh Rayon of Azerbaijan. As of 2007, it had a population of 304.
