= Lalapaşa (disambiguation) =

Lalapaşa (literally "tutor pasha") is a Turkish name and may refer to:

- Lalapaşa, a town and district center in Edirne Province, Turkey
- Lələpaşa, a village in Qakh Rayon, Azerbaijan

== See also ==
- Lala (title)
- Lala Şahin Pasha
- Lala Kara Mustafa Pasha
- Tekeli Lala Mehmet Pasha
