= Zərnə =

- Municipality
- Location within Azerbaijan Location within Shaki-Zagatala Economic Region
- Coordinates: 41°30′38″N 46°49′05″E
- Country: Azerbaijan
- Rayon: Qakh

Population
  - Total: 781
- Time zone: UTC+4 (AZT)
  - Summer (DST): UTC+5 (AZT)

Zərnə is a village and municipality in the Qakh Rayon of Azerbaijan. It has a population of 781.

== Notable natives ==
- Ismayil Daghistanli — Azerbaijani Soviet actor, People's Artist of USSR (1974), Hero of Socialist Labor
