= Bağtala =

Coordinates: 41°22′N 46°49′E

Bağtala is a village in the municipality of Uzuntala in the Qakh Rayon of Azerbaijan. According to Azerbaijan's State Statistics Committee, only nine people lived in the village as of 2014.
