= Çüdüllü =

- Location within Azerbaijan Location within Shaki-Zagatala Economic Region
- Coordinates: 41°26′58″N 46°46′35″E
- Country: Azerbaijan
- Rayon: Qakh
- Time zone: UTC+4 (AZT)
  - Summer (DST): UTC+5 (AZT)

Çüdüllü (also, Çudulu, Chudullu, Chudulo, and Chudulu) is a village in the Qakh Rayon of Azerbaijan.
