= Qorağan =

- Municipality
- Location within Azerbaijan Location within Shaki-Zagatala Economic Region
- Coordinates: 41°22′56″N 46°43′57″E
- Country: Azerbaijan
- Rayon: Qakh

Population
  - Total: 1,262
- Time zone: UTC+4 (AZT)
  - Summer (DST): UTC+5 (AZT)

Qorağan (also known as Goragan, Karagan, and Koragan) is a village and municipality in the Qakh Rayon of Azerbaijan. It has a population of 1,262.
