= Çinarlı, Qakh =

Çinarlı
- Municipality
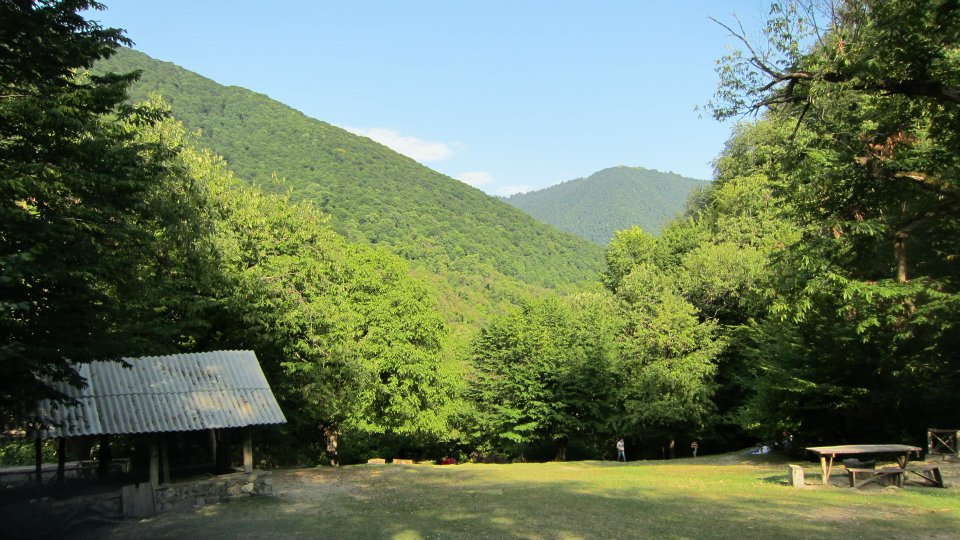

- Location within Azerbaijan Location within Shaki-Zagatala Economic Region
- Coordinates: 41°28′21″N 46°54′40″E
- Country: Azerbaijan
- Rayon: Qakh

Population
  - Total: 415
- Time zone: UTC+4 (AZT)
  - Summer (DST): UTC+5 (AZT)

Çinarlı (also, Chinarly) is a village and municipality in the Qakh Rayon of Azerbaijan. It has a population of 415.
