= Qaxbaş =

- Municipality
- Location within Azerbaijan Location within Shaki-Zagatala Economic Region
- Coordinates: 41°26′N 46°58′E
- Country: Azerbaijan
- Rayon: Qakh

Population
  - Total: 2,983
- Time zone: UTC+4 (AZT)
  - Summer (DST): UTC+5 (AZT)

Qaxbaş (also, Kakhbash) is a village and the most populous municipality, except for the capital Qax, in the Qakh Rayon of Azerbaijan. It has a population of 2,983. The municipality consists of the villages of Qaxbaş. it is historic Georgian village Kakhistavi. great majority of population are ethnic Georgians and Kiçik Alatəmir.
