= Oncallı =

- Municipality
- Location within Azerbaijan Location within Shaki-Zagatala Economic Region
- Coordinates: 41°16′56″N 46°51′27″E
- Country: Azerbaijan
- Rayon: Qakh

Population
  - Total: 472
- Time zone: UTC+4 (AZT)
  - Summer (DST): UTC+5 (AZT)

Oncallı (also, Ondzhally) is a village and municipality in the Qakh Rayon of Azerbaijan. It has a population of 472.
