= Üzümlükənd =

- Location within Azerbaijan Location within Shaki-Zagatala Economic Region
- Coordinates: 41°11′55″N 46°43′20″E
- Country: Azerbaijan
- Rayon: Qakh
- Municipality: Ağyazı
- Time zone: UTC+4 (AZT)
  - Summer (DST): UTC+5 (AZT)

Üzümlükənd (also, Üzümlü and Uzyumlyukend) is a village in the Qakh Rayon of Azerbaijan. The village forms part of the municipality of Ağyazı.
