= Keşqutan =

- Location within Azerbaijan Location within Shaki-Zagatala Economic Region
- Coordinates: 41°22′N 46°55′E
- Country: Azerbaijan
- Rayon: Qakh
- Municipality: Xələftala
- Time zone: UTC+4 (AZT)
  - Summer (DST): UTC+5 (AZT)

Keşqutan (also, Qeşqutan and Keshkutan) is a village in the Qakh Rayon of Azerbaijan. The village forms part of the municipality of Xələftala.
