= Qaxmuğal =

Qakh-Mughal Qaxmuğal
- Location within Azerbaijan Location within Shaki-Zagatala Economic Region
- Coordinates: 41°25′56″N 46°58′13″E
- Country: Azerbaijan
- Rayon: Qakh
- Time zone: UTC+4 (AZT)
  - Summer (DST): UTC+5 (AZT)

Qaxmuğal (also, Kach-Mugal and Kakhmugal) is a village in the Qakh Rayon of Azerbaijan.

== Etnotoponym ==
Mughal is a name used for Tatars & Mongols by the Muslim population. In the 13th century when Azerbaijan and the Caucasus was under the rule of the Mongols, some tribes have moved to Qakh, due to its incredible nature and pastures. Hence Qakh Mughal settlement was created.

== Population ==
In the span of many years since 13th century, local Caucasian people intermarried with the Turkic speaking "Mughals" in the settlement. In the census of 1869 the Tatars (Mughals) constituted of 95 families and by 1914 were accounted of 1090 heads.

== Bibliography ==
- Qaxmuğal at GEOnet Names Server
