= Qapıçay =

Qapıçay Kapychay
- Interactive map of Qapıçay
- Coordinates: 41.4913°N 46.8019°E

Qapıçay is a municipality and village in the Qakh Rayon of Azerbaijan. It has a population of 332. Qapıçay is nearby to Zarna, Gyullyuk and Gora Arpat’yandag. It has an elevation of 266 meters.
