= Qındırğa =

- Municipality
- Location within Azerbaijan Location within Shaki-Zagatala Economic Region
- Coordinates: 41°22′32″N 46°39′06″E
- Country: Azerbaijan
- Rayon: Qakh

Population
  - Total: 105
- Time zone: UTC+4 (AZT)
  - Summer (DST): UTC+5 (AZT)

Qındırğa (also known as Qındırqa, Kandyrga, and Kyndyrga) is a village and the least populous municipality in the Qakh Rayon of Azerbaijan. It has a population of 105.
