= Xələftala =

- Municipality
- Location within Azerbaijan Location within Shaki-Zagatala Economic Region
- Coordinates: 41°20′31″N 46°54′17″E
- Country: Azerbaijan
- Rayon: Qakh

Population
  - Total: 118
- Time zone: UTC+4 (AZT)
  - Summer (DST): UTC+5 (AZT)

Xələftala (also, Khalaftala and Khalatala) is a village and municipality in the Qakh Rayon of Azerbaijan. It has a population of 118. The municipality consists of the villages of Xələftala, Qımırlı, and Keşqutan.
