= İbaxlı =

- Municipality
- Location within Azerbaijan Location within Shaki-Zagatala Economic Region
- Coordinates: 41°21′32″N 46°51′33″E
- Country: Azerbaijan
- Rayon: Qakh

Population
  - Total: 527
- Time zone: UTC+4 (AZT)
  - Summer (DST): UTC+5 (AZT)

İbaxlı (also, İsaxlı, Ibakhly, Isakly, and İsaqlı) is a village and municipality in the Qakh Rayon of Azerbaijan. It has a population of 527.
