= Şıxlar, Qakh =

Şıxlar
- Municipality
- Location within Azerbaijan Location within Shaki-Zagatala Economic Region
- Coordinates: 41°21′26″N 46°46′32″E
- Country: Azerbaijan
- Rayon: Qakh

Population
  - Total: 245
- Time zone: UTC+4 (AZT)
  - Summer (DST): UTC+5 (AZT)

Şıxlar (also known as Shykhlyar, Shikhlar, or Shykhlar) is a village and municipality in the Qakh Rayon of Azerbaijan. It has a population of 245.
