= Tasmalı =

- Municipality
- Location within Azerbaijan Location within Shaki-Zagatala Economic Region
- Coordinates: 41°26′16″N 46°42′12″E
- Country: Azerbaijan
- Rayon: Qakh

Population
  - Total: 1,468
- Time zone: UTC+4 (AZT)
  - Summer (DST): UTC+5 (AZT)

Tasmalı (also known as Tasmaly and Tasmanly) is a village and municipality in the Qakh Rayon of Azerbaijan. It has a population of 1,468.
