= Suskənd =

- Municipality
- Location within Azerbaijan Location within Shaki-Zagatala Economic Region
- Coordinates: 41°26′42″N 46°52′19″E
- Country: Azerbaijan
- Rayon: Qakh

Population
  - Total: 211
- Time zone: UTC+4 (AZT)
  - Summer (DST): UTC+5 (AZT)

Suskənd (also, Süskən, Suskend, and Syusgen) is a village and municipality in the Qakh Rayon of Azerbaijan. It has a population of 211.
