= Uzuntala, Qakh =

Uzuntala
- Municipality
- Location within Azerbaijan Location within Shaki-Zagatala Economic Region
- Coordinates: 41°20′N 46°51′E
- Country: Azerbaijan
- Rayon: Qakh

Population
  - Total: 122
- Time zone: UTC+4 (AZT)
  - Summer (DST): UTC+5 (AZT)

Uzuntala is a village and municipality in the Qakh Rayon of Azerbaijan. It has a population of 122. The municipality consists of the villages of Uzuntala and Bağtala.
