= Yeni İlisu =

- Municipality
- Location within Azerbaijan Location within Shaki-Zagatala Economic Region
- Coordinates: 41°30′38″N 46°49′05″E
- Country: Azerbaijan
- Rayon: Qakh
- Time zone: UTC+4 (AZT)
  - Summer (DST): UTC+5 (AZT)

Yeni İlisu is a village and municipality in the Qakh Rayon of Azerbaijan.
