= Amanlı =

- Municipality
- Location within Azerbaijan Location within Shaki-Zagatala Economic Region
- Coordinates: 41°17′N 46°51′E
- Country: Azerbaijan
- Rayon: Qakh

Population
  - Total: 157
- Time zone: UTC+4 (AZT)
  - Summer (DST): UTC+5 (AZT)

Amanlı (also, Amanly and Amonly) is a village and municipality in the Qakh Rayon of Azerbaijan. It has a population of 157.
