= Ağayazı Buduq =

Aghyazi Budug
- Municipality
- Azerbaijani: Ağyazi Buduq
- Location within Azerbaijan
- Coordinates: 41°24′03″N 48°44′11″E
- Country: Azerbaijan
- District: Khachmaz
- Municipality: Yerguj

Population
  - Total: 1,104
- Time zone: UTC+4 (AZT)
  - Summer (DST): UTC+5 (AZT)

Ağyazı Buduq (also, Aghyazi Budug) is a village in the Khachmaz District of Azerbaijan. It has a population of 1,104.
