= Əmirxanlı, Shabran =

Əmirxanlı is a village and municipality in the Shabran Rayon of Azerbaijan. It has a population of 1,382. The municipality consists of the villages of Əmirxanlı and Üzümlü.
