= Cəlayir, Qakh =

Jalayir
- Municipality
- Azerbaijani: Cəlayir
- Location within Azerbaijan Location within Shaki-Zagatala Economic Region
- Coordinates: 41°19′12″N 46°47′56″E
- Country: Azerbaijan
- District: Qakh

Population
  - Total: 1,407
- Time zone: UTC+4 (AZT)
  - Summer (DST): UTC+5 (AZT)

Cəlayir (Jalayir) is a village and municipality in the Qakh District of Azerbaijan. It has a population of 1,407.
