= Köhnə Xudat, Khachmaz =

Kohna Khudat
- Municipality
- Azerbaijani: Köhnə Xudat
- Location within Azerbaijan
- Coordinates: 41°37′19″N 48°39′28″E
- Country: Azerbaijan
- District: Khachmaz

Population
  - Total: 1,252
- Time zone: UTC+4 (AZT)
  - Summer (DST): UTC+5 (AZT)

Köhnə Xudat (also, Kohna Khudat) is a village and municipality in the Khachmaz District of Azerbaijan. It has a population of 1,252.
