= Dəymədağlı, Qakh =

Dəymədağlı
- Municipality
- Location within Azerbaijan Location within Shaki-Zagatala Economic Region
- Coordinates: 41°20′10″N 46°45′27″E
- Country: Azerbaijan
- Rayon: Qakh

Population
  - Total: 729
- Time zone: UTC+4 (AZT)
  - Summer (DST): UTC+5 (AZT)

Dəymədağlı (also, Daymadagly and Deymadagly) is a village and municipality in the Qakh Rayon of Azerbaijan. It has a population of 729.
