= Sarıbaş =

- Municipality
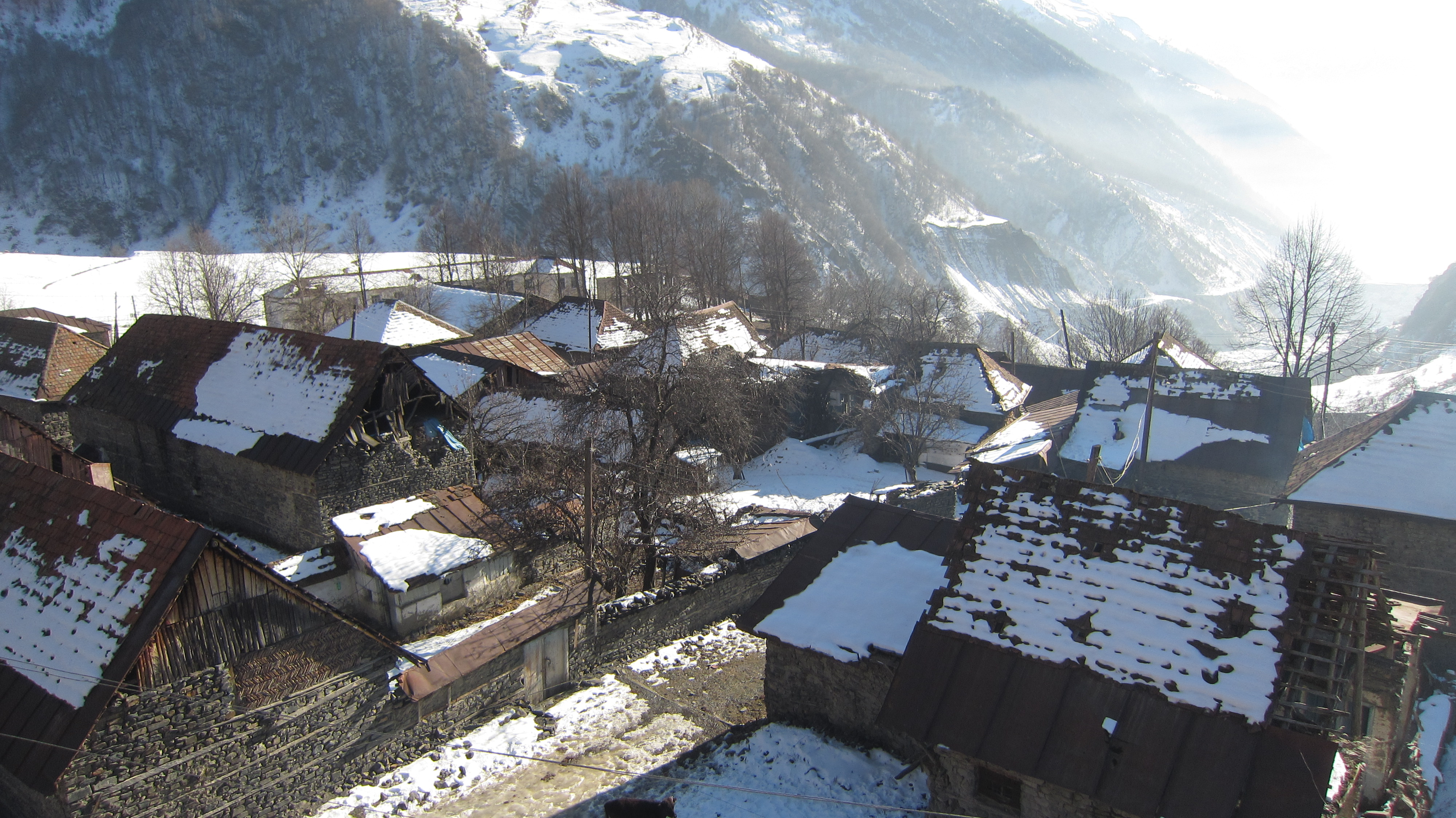

- Location within Azerbaijan Location within Shaki-Zagatala Economic Region
- Coordinates: 41°31′27″N 47°04′30″E
- Country: Azerbaijan
- Rayon: Qakh

Population
  - Total: 166
- Time zone: UTC+4 (AZT)
  - Summer (DST): UTC+5 (AZT)

Sarıbaş (also, Sari-Bash and Sarybash) is a village and municipality in the Qakh Rayon of Azerbaijan. It has a population of 166.

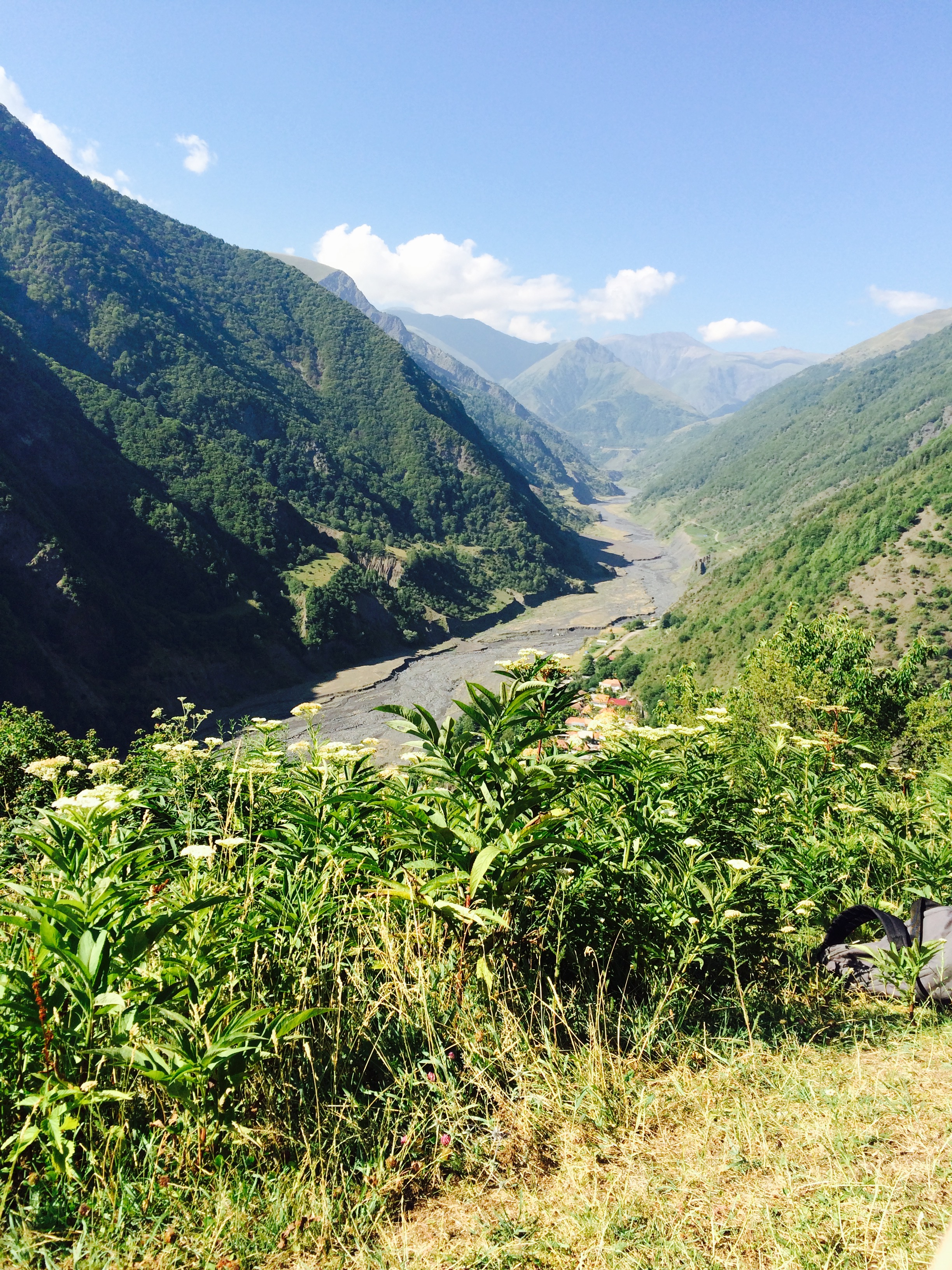
Saribash

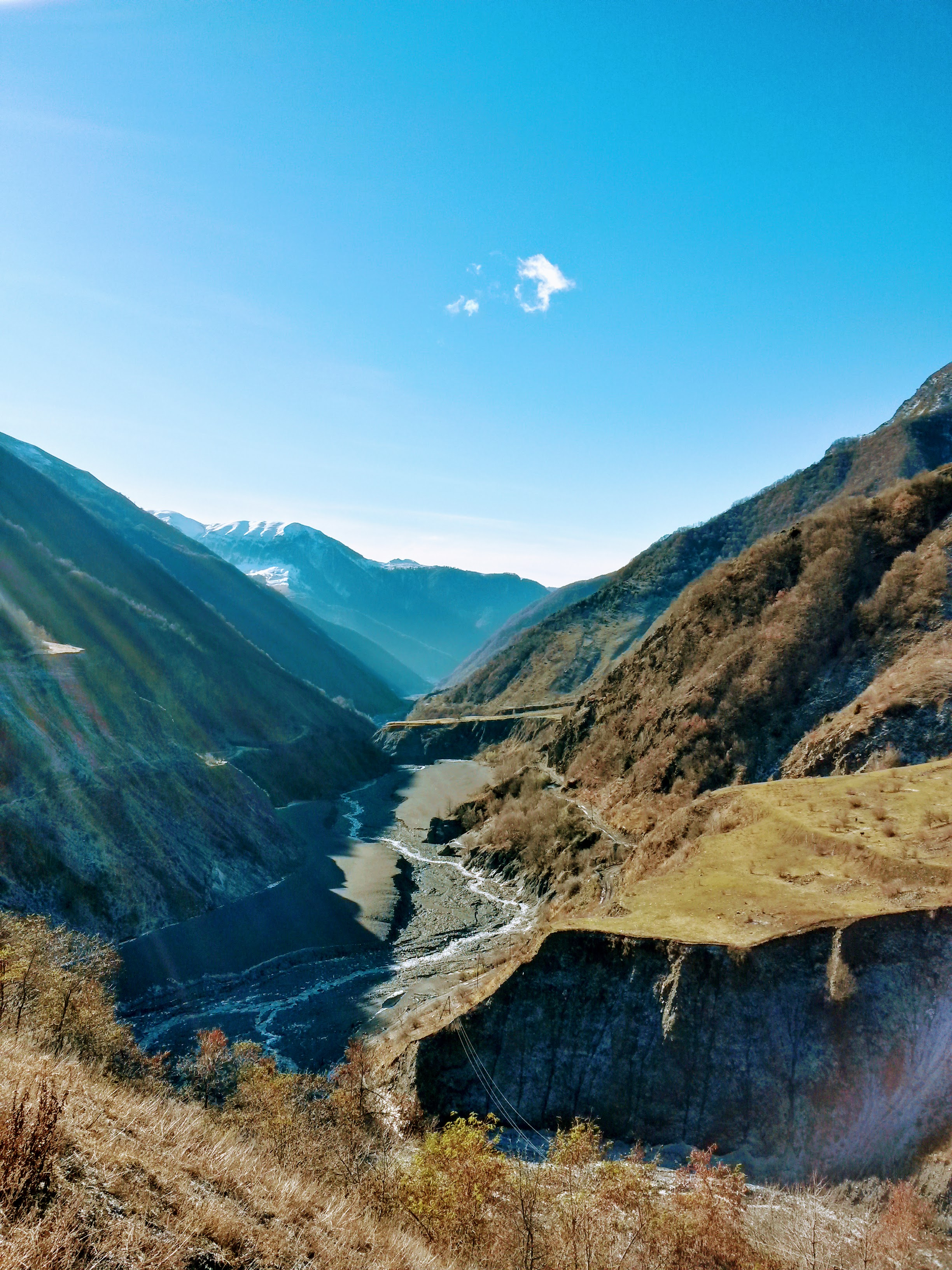
Kurumchay
