= Ağyazı, Qakh =

Aghyazi
- Municipality
- Azerbaijani: Ağyazı
- Location within Azerbaijan Location within Shaki-Zagatala Economic Region
- Coordinates: 41°14′14″N 46°44′27″E
- Country: Azerbaijan
- District: Qakh

Population
  - Total: 733
- Time zone: UTC+4 (AZT)
  - Summer (DST): UTC+5 (AZT)

Ağyazı (also, Aghayazi) is a village and municipality in the Qakh District of Azerbaijan. It has a population of 733. The municipality consists of the villages of Aghyazi and Üzümlükənd.
