= Köhnə Xudat, Qusar =

Kohna Khudat
- Municipality
- Azerbaijani: Köhnə Xudat
- Location within Azerbaijan
- Coordinates: 41°27′37″N 48°25′32″E
- Country: Azerbaijan
- District: Qusar

Population
  - Total: 1,766
- Time zone: UTC+4 (AZT)
  - Summer (DST): UTC+5 (AZT)

Köhnə Xudat (also, Kohna Khudat) is a village and municipality in the Qusar District of Azerbaijan. It has a population of 1,766.
