= Üzümlü, Shabran =

Coordinates: 41°09′N 48°58′E

Üzümlü is a village in the municipality of Əmirxanlı in the Davachi Rayon of Azerbaijan.
