= Almalı, Qakh =

Almalı
- Municipality
- Location within Azerbaijan Location within Shaki-Zagatala Economic Region
- Coordinates: 41°20′29″N 46°45′33″E
- Country: Azerbaijan
- District: Qakh

Population
  - Total: 1,883
- Time zone: UTC+4 (AZT)
  - Summer (DST): UTC+5 (AZT)

Almalı (also, Almaly and Almalo) is a village and municipality in the Qakh District of Azerbaijan. It has a population of 1,883.
