= Cəlayir, Jalilabad =

Jalayir
- Municipality
- Azerbaijani: Cəlayir
- Location within Azerbaijan
- Coordinates: 39°13′33″N 48°19′10″E
- Country: Azerbaijan
- District: Jalilabad

Population
  - Total: 1,004
- Time zone: UTC+4 (AZT)
  - Summer (DST): UTC+5 (AZT)

Cəlayir (Jalayir) is a village and municipality in the Jalilabad District of Azerbaijan. It has a population of 1,004.
