= Dəymədağlı, Oghuz =

Dəymədağlı
- Municipality
- Location within Azerbaijan Location within Shaki-Zagatala Economic Region
- Coordinates: 40°58′25″N 47°38′16″E
- Country: Azerbaijan
- Rayon: Oghuz

Population
  - Total: 288
- Time zone: UTC+4 (AZT)
  - Summer (DST): UTC+5 (AZT)

Dəymədağlı (also, Daymadagly and Deymedagyly) is a village and municipality in the Oghuz Rayon of Azerbaijan. It has a population of 288.
