= Fıstıqlı =

- Municipality
- Location within Azerbaijan Location within Shaki-Zagatala Economic Region
- Coordinates: 41°26′42″N 46°47′33″E
- Country: Azerbaijan
- Rayon: Qakh

Population
  - Total: 262
- Time zone: UTC+4 (AZT)
  - Summer (DST): UTC+5 (AZT)

Fıstıqlı (also, Fıstıklı, Fısdıqlı, Fistiali, and Fystykhly) is a village and municipality in the Qakh Rayon of Azerbaijan. It has a population of 262.
