= Böyük Alatəmir =

- Municipality
- Location within Azerbaijan Location within Shaki-Zagatala Economic Region
- Coordinates: 41°24′42″N 46°48′58″E
- Country: Azerbaijan
- Rayon: Qakh

Population
  - Total: 720
- Time zone: UTC+4 (AZT)
  - Summer (DST): UTC+5 (AZT)

Böyük Alatəmir (also, Alatemur-Beyuk, Bëyuk Alatemir, and Beyuk-Alateymur) is a village and municipality in the Qakh Rayon of Azerbaijan. It has a population of 718.
