= Tanqıt =

- Municipality
- Location within Azerbaijan Location within Shaki-Zagatala Economic Region
- Coordinates: 41°17′02″N 46°53′16″E
- Country: Azerbaijan
- Rayon: Qakh

Population
  - Total: 166
- Time zone: UTC+4 (AZT)
  - Summer (DST): UTC+5 (AZT)

Tanqıt (also, Tangıt and Tangyt) is a village and municipality in the Qakh Rayon of Azerbaijan. It has a population of 166.
