= Qazmalar =

Gazmalar
- Municipality
- Azerbaijani: Qazmalar
- Location within Azerbaijan Location within Shaki-Zagatala Economic Region
- Coordinates: 41°18′05″N 46°52′44″E
- Country: Azerbaijan
- District: Qakh

Population
  - Total: 249
- Time zone: UTC+4 (AZT)
  - Summer (DST): UTC+5 (AZT)

Qazmalar (also, Gazmalar) is a village and municipality in the Qakh District of Azerbaijan. It has a population of 249.
