= Baydarlı, Azerbaijan =

Baydarlı
- Municipality
- Location within Azerbaijan Location within Shaki-Zagatala Economic Region
- Coordinates: 41°16′41″N 46°52′02″E
- Country: Azerbaijan
- Rayon: Qakh

Population
  - Total: 368
- Time zone: UTC+4 (AZT)
  - Summer (DST): UTC+5 (AZT)

Baydarlı (also, Baydarly) is a village and municipality in the Qakh Rayon of Azerbaijan. It has a population of 368.

== Notable natives ==
- Mammad Mammadov — Hero of the Soviet Union.
