= Kiçik Alatəmir =

- Location within Azerbaijan Location within Shaki-Zagatala Economic Region
- Coordinates: 41°24′N 46°50′E
- Country: Azerbaijan
- Rayon: Qakh
- Municipality: Qaxbaş
- Time zone: UTC+4 (AZT)
  - Summer (DST): UTC+5 (AZT)

Kiçik Alatəmir (also, Alatemur-Bala and Kichik Alatemir) is a village in the Qakh Rayon of Azerbaijan. The village forms part of the municipality of Qaxbaş.
