= Meşəbaş =

- Municipality
- Location within Azerbaijan Location within Shaki-Zagatala Economic Region
- Coordinates: 41°24′32″N 46°52′28″E
- Country: Azerbaijan
- Rayon: Qakh
- Elevation: 425 m (1,394 ft)

Population
  - Total: 382
- Time zone: UTC+4 (AZT)
  - Summer (DST): UTC+5 (AZT)

Meşəbaş (also, Meshabash) is a village and municipality in the Qakh Rayon of Azerbaijan. It has a population of 382. It was historically the Georgian village Tkistavi. The great majority of the population are ethnic Georgians.
