= Ağyazı, Shaki =

Aghyazi
- Azerbaijani: Ağyazı
- Location within Azerbaijan
- Coordinates: 41°10′37″N 47°00′25″E
- Country: Azerbaijan
- District: Shaki
- Time zone: UTC+4 (AZT)
  - Summer (DST): UTC+5 (AZT)

Ağyazı (also, Aghyazi) is a village in the Shaki District of Azerbaijan.
