= Cəlayir, Agsu =

Jalayir
- Municipality
- Azerbaijani: Cəlayir
- Location within Azerbaijan
- Coordinates: 40°21′41″N 48°25′26″E
- Country: Azerbaijan
- District: Agsu

Population
  - Total: 1,437
- Time zone: UTC+4 (AZT)
  - Summer (DST): UTC+5 (AZT)

Cəlayir (Jalayir) is a village and municipality in the Agsu District of Azerbaijan. It has a population of 1,437.
