= Qarabaldır, Qakh =

Qarabaldır
- Municipality
- Location within Azerbaijan Location within Shaki-Zagatala Economic Region
- Coordinates: 41°24′N 46°43′E
- Country: Azerbaijan
- Rayon: Qakh

Population
  - Total: 409
- Time zone: UTC+4 (AZT)
  - Summer (DST): UTC+5 (AZT)

Qarabaldır (also, Karabaldyr) is a village and municipality in the Qakh Rayon of Azerbaijan. It has a population of 409.
