= Lələpaşa =

- Municipality
- Location within Azerbaijan Location within Shaki-Zagatala Economic Region
- Coordinates: 41°26′23″N 46°43′11″E
- Country: Azerbaijan
- Rayon: Qakh

Population
  - Total: 464
- Time zone: UTC+4 (AZT)
  - Summer (DST): UTC+5 (AZT)

Lələpaşa (also, Lelapasha and Lyalyapasha) is a village and municipality in the Qakh Rayon of Azerbaijan. It has a population of 464.
