= Ağçay, Qakh =

Ağçay
- Municipality
- Location within Azerbaijan Location within Shaki-Zagatala Economic Region
- Coordinates: 41°27′29″N 47°00′05″E
- Country: Azerbaijan
- Rayon: Qakh

Population
  - Total: 376
- Time zone: UTC+4 (AZT)
  - Summer (DST): UTC+5 (AZT)

Ağçay (also, Agchay) is a village and municipality in the Qakh Rayon of Azerbaijan. It has a population of 376.
