= Kazmalar, Khachmaz =

Kazmalar
- Location within Azerbaijan
- Coordinates: 41°48′06″N 48°38′48″E
- Country: Azerbaijan
- Rayon: Khachmaz
- Time zone: UTC+4 (AZT)
  - Summer (DST): UTC+5 (AZT)

Kazmalar (also, Leger-Kazmalar) is a village in the Khachmaz Rayon of Azerbaijan.
