= Qarabaldır, Oghuz =

Qarabaldır
- Municipality
- Location within Azerbaijan Location within Shaki-Zagatala Economic Region
- Coordinates: 40°58′54″N 47°26′09″E
- Country: Azerbaijan
- Rayon: Oghuz

Population
  - Total: 502
- Time zone: UTC+4 (AZT)
  - Summer (DST): UTC+5 (AZT)

Qarabaldır (also, Karabaldyr) is a village and municipality in the Oghuz Rayon of Azerbaijan that has a population of 502.
