= Ashagy Emirkhanly =

Aşağı Əmirxanlı
- Location within Azerbaijan
- Coordinates: 41°09′N 48°55′E
- Country: Azerbaijan
- Rayon: Shabran
- Time zone: UTC+4 (AZT)
  - Summer (DST): UTC+5 (AZT)

Aşağı Əmirxanlı (also, Ashagy Emirkhanly) is a village in the Shabran Rayon of Azerbaijan.
