= Əmircan, Qakh =

Əmircan
- Municipality
- Location within Azerbaijan Location within Shaki-Zagatala Economic Region
- Coordinates: 41°25′43″N 46°51′34″E
- Country: Azerbaijan
- Rayon: Qakh

Population
  - Total: 567
- Time zone: UTC+4 (AZT)
  - Summer (DST): UTC+5 (AZT)

Əmircan (also, Amirdzhan) is a village and municipality in the Qakh Rayon of Azerbaijan. It has a population of 567.
