= Köhnə Xudat Qazmalar =

Kohna Khudat Gazmalar
- Municipality
- Azerbaijani: Köhnə Xudat Qazmalar
- Location within Azerbaijan
- Coordinates: 41°27′32″N 48°28′14″E
- Country: Azerbaijan
- District: Qusar

Population
  - Total: 663
- Time zone: UTC+4 (AZT)
  - Summer (DST): UTC+5 (AZT)

Köhnə Xudat Qazmalar (also, Kohna Khudat Gazmalar) is a village and municipality in the Qusar District of Azerbaijan. It has a population of 663.
