= Qakh District =

District in northern Azerbaijan

Coordinates: 41.4167°N 46.9167°E

- District
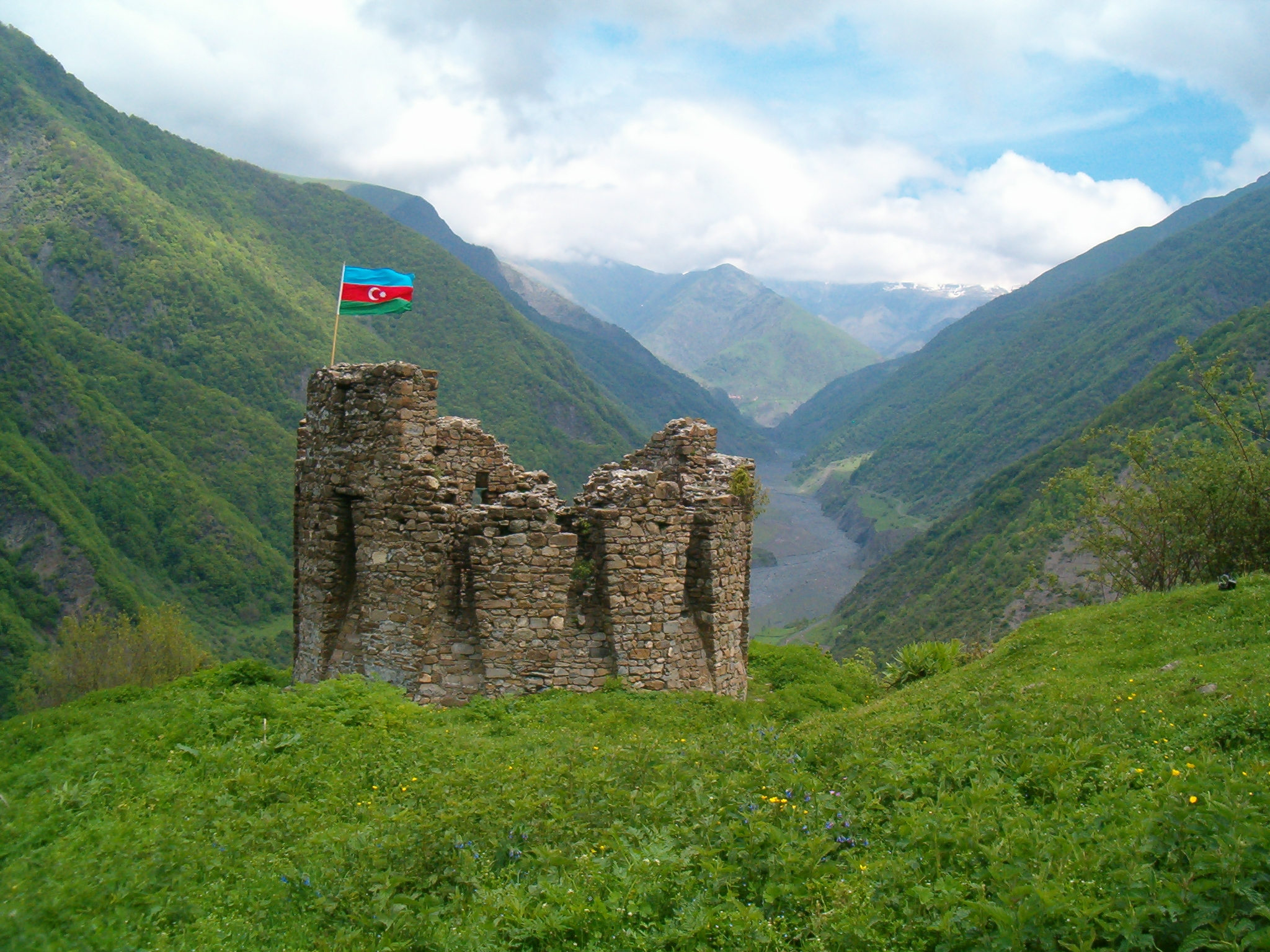

- Map of Azerbaijan showing the Qakh District
- Country: Azerbaijan
- Region: Shaki-Zagatala
- Established: 8 August 1930
- Capital: Qakh
- Settlements: 59

Government
  - Governor: Musa Shakiliyev

Area
  - Total: 1,490 km^{2} (580 sq mi)

Population (2020)
  - Total: 57,200
  - Density: 38.4/km^{2} (99.4/sq mi)
- Time zone: UTC+4 (AZT)
- Postal code: 3400
- Website: qax-ih.gov.az

Qakh District (Azerbaijani: Qax rayonu; Georgian: კახის რაიონი, romanized: K′akhis raioni; Tsakhur: Къахын район, romanized: Qaxın rayon) is one of the 66 districts of Azerbaijan. It is located in the north of the country, in the Shaki-Zagatala Economic Region. The district borders the districts of Zagatala, Shaki, Samukh, Yevlakh, as well as the Kakheti region of Georgia and the Russian Republic of Dagestan. Its capital and largest city is Qakh. As of 2020, the district had a population of 57,200.

== Geography ==
The region is dominated by hot and subtropical climate. However mountainous areas are rather cold. Annual rain precipitation varies from 300mm (in the south) to 1600mm in mountain areas.

Meadows, water resources, forests, and fertile soils are providing space for agricultural development, especially for walnut, chestnut production.

Heavy rains and snowmelts from mountains often result in a flood.

The region also has one of the biggest Natural Reserves in Azerbaijan named “Ilisu Natural Reserve”. Reserve is located near Aghchay village.

Region borders with Dagestan Republic (Russia) in north east, Zagatala region in the north, Samukh region in the south, Georgia in the west. Gakh region accounts for 13% of water supplies of Caucasus (3873 cubic kilometers), 100 thousand cub meters of which are extracted for the administrative district, 63 000 of which used for irrigation and only 2 000 cub meters are used for agriculture. Rest is used for domestic consumption and production.

== Local economy ==
The local economy is specialized in crop production and livestock. The most common products produced here are tobacco and grain.

The main enterprises are canned food and vegetables. Other enterprises cover sweets, oil products, and beverages. Enterprises mainly cover domestic demand and ship products to other districts.

The region is also rich with minerals and building raw materials, such as rubble, sand, clay, sulfur, etc.

These materials are widespread in river valleys, especially in the valleys of the Kurmuk River and its branches.

Furthermore, mineral springs are also common in the region. Near Suskand village “Gah” mineral water is produced.

== History ==
The Qakh region of Azerbaijan has a long history dating back to ancient times. Archaeological excavations the area had been populated during Eneolithic, Bronze and early Iron Ages. What remains of these early inhabitants' activities indicates they engaged largely in sedentary cultivation, animal-breeding and art. Qax (Kakhi) region was part of Kakheti-Hereti Kingdom and then part of the united Georgian kingdom.

In 1921 Kakhi Region became part of Azerbaijan.

With the spread of Christianity throughout the region during the existence of Caucasian Albania, some Churches were built in the Qakh district. In the 8th century A.D., Qakh fell under Arab Umayyad occupation. Starting from the 11th century first Oghuz Turks and later Qipchaq Turks inhabited the area, the region was incorporated into the Seljuq Empire. Qakh was later a part of Atabeg and Shirvanshah states. With the invasion of Hulaguids in Azerbaijan in the 13th century, Mongolian nomadic tribes populated the region.

According to the legend mentioned by 19th century author I. Linevich, the city of Qakh was called Toraghay (Azerbaijani: Torağay) until 16th century. This word was mentioned in Mahmud Kashgari's dictionary called "Dīwān Lughāt al-Turk". According to the dictionary, it means "shelter between the mountains" in the Kipchak language. Considering the city of Qakh is located in a lowland area between the mountains, it can be said that the Kipchaks who came through the North Caucasus settled in Qakh and called the area as "Toraghay". One of the districts of the regional center of Qakh is still called Qakh-mughal. This can be explained as the influence of Mongol period.

In 1562, by the order of the Safavid Shah Tahmasp I, Ilisu Sultanate was established in Qakh. In the 18th century, Ilisu Sultanate became so powerful that, the Ottoman Emperor conferred its ruler Ali Sultan Bey the highest title of Pasha recognizing him as the Beylerbey of Shaki.

In 1803 the sultanate of Ilisu was annexed to the Russian empire. The ruler of the sultanate, Daniyal, inspired the people to rise against Russian rule in 1844, due to a disagreement between him and the government of Russia. Sultan Daniyel was defeated near the village of İlisu and continued his struggle against Russian along with the leader of the national freedom movement, Sheykh Shamil. Russians burnt Ilisu and divided the territory of the sultanate into mahals (territorial units) and annexed them to the Jar-Balaken daire (a territorial unit) converting it into a colony of tsarist Russia. With proclamation of independence of Azerbaijan Democratic Republic in May 1918, Qakh became disputed between ADR and DRG. During the Soviet rule, Qakh was established as raion of Azerbaijan SSR in 1930.

== Demographics ==
Ethnic groups in Qakh (2019)
1. Azerbaijanis (81.9%)
2. Georgians (13.7%)
3. Tsakhurs (3.03%)
4. Others (1.40%)

The overall statistics indicate the population growth fluctuates. For instance, In 2000 there were 832 newly born, in 2006 - 816, down to 753 in 2009.

The Qakh District is also a centre of the Georgian minority in Azerbaijan, with most of the ones in this district being of Christian origin.

Ethnic group	1999		2009	
Ethnic group	Population	%	Population	%
Total	51 161	100.00	53 259	100.00
Azerbaijanis	39 355	76.92	43 946	82.51
Ingiloy (Georgians)	7 450	14.56	7 447	13.98
Tsakhurs	2 612	5.11	1 008	1.89
Lezgins	609	1.19	253	0.48
Russians	91	0.18	67	0.13
Turks	96	0.19	64	0.12
Avars	11	0.02	9	0.02
Tatars	7	0.01	7	0.01
Armenians	5	0.01	7	0.01
Ukrainians	26	0.05	5	0.01
Others	899	1.76	446	0.84

== Villages ==
There are 59 villages in the district:

- Ağçay
- Ağyazı
- Almalı
- Amanlı
- Armudlu
- Bağtala
- Baydarlı
- Böyük Alatəmir
- Cəlayer
- Çinarlı
- Çüdüllü
- Dəymədağlı
- Əlibəyli
- Əmbərçay
- Əmircan
- Fıstıqlı
- Güllük
- İbaxlı
- İlisu
- Keşqutan
- Kiçik Alatəmir
- Kötüklü
- Ləkit
- Ləkit Kötüklü
- Ləkit Malax
- Lələli
- Lələpaşa
- Malax
- Marsan
- Meşəbaş
- Oncallı
- Qapıçay
- Qarabaldır
- Qarameşə
- Qaratala
- Qaşqaçay
- Qaxbaş
- Qaxingiloy
- Qaxmuğal
- Qaysarlı
- Qazmalar
- Qımır
- Qındırğa
- Qıpçaq
- Qorağan
- Qum
- Sarıbaş
- Şıxlar
- Şotavar
- Süskən
- Tanqıt
- Tasmalı
- Turaclı
- Üzümlü
- Uzuntala
- Xələftala
- Yeni İlisu
- Zərnə
- Zəyəm

== Gallery ==
Nature and historical monuments in Qakh District

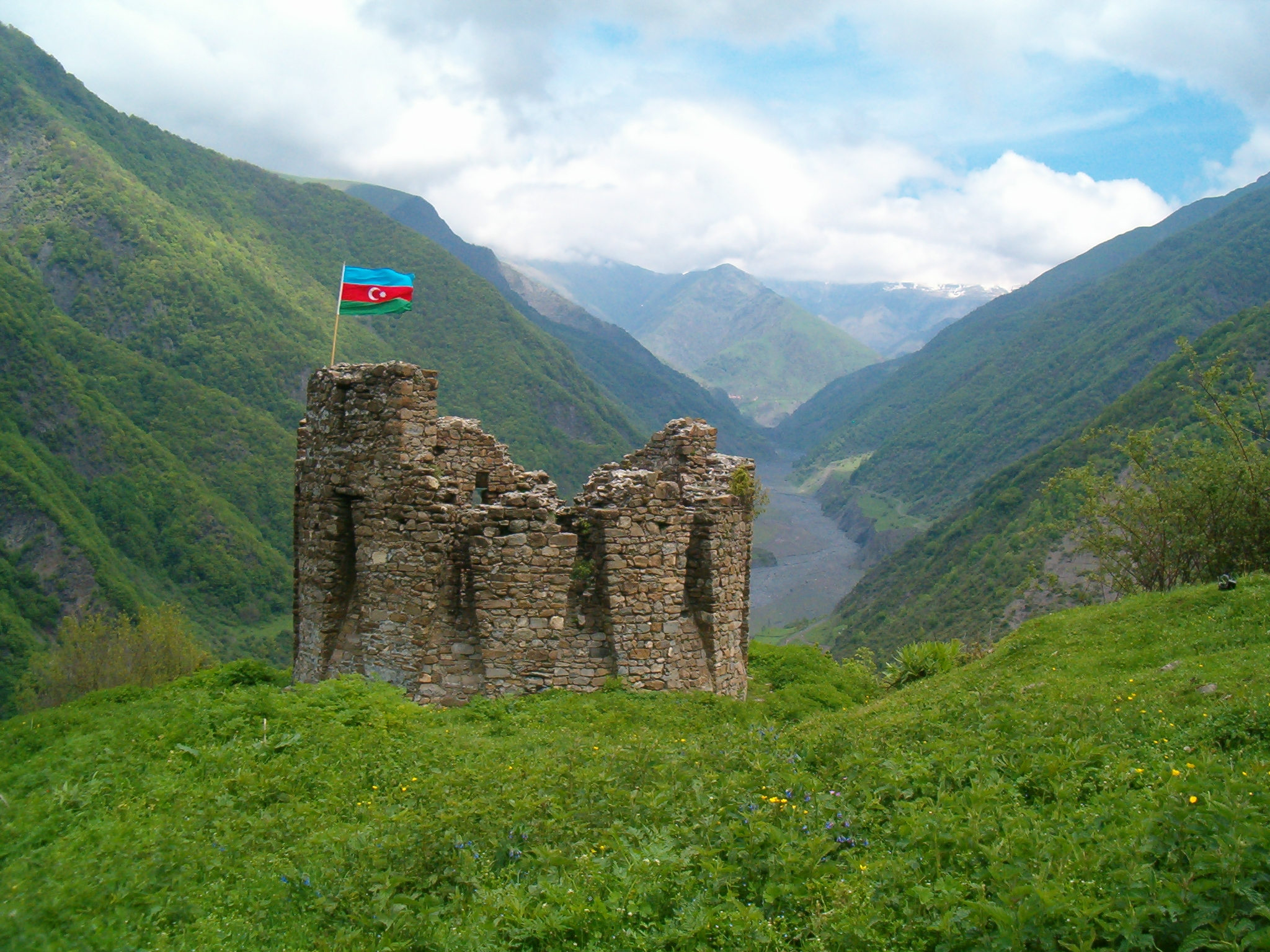

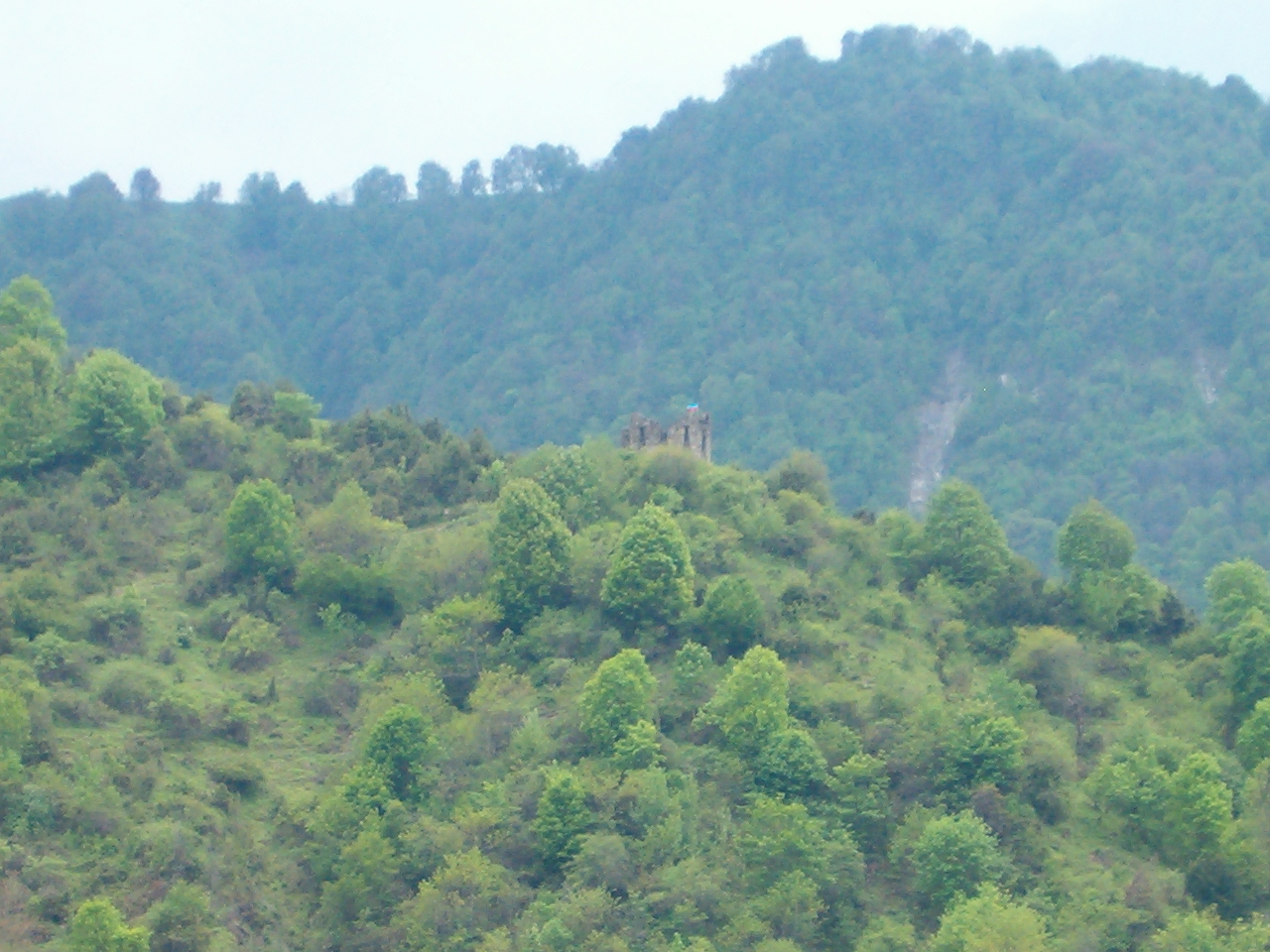

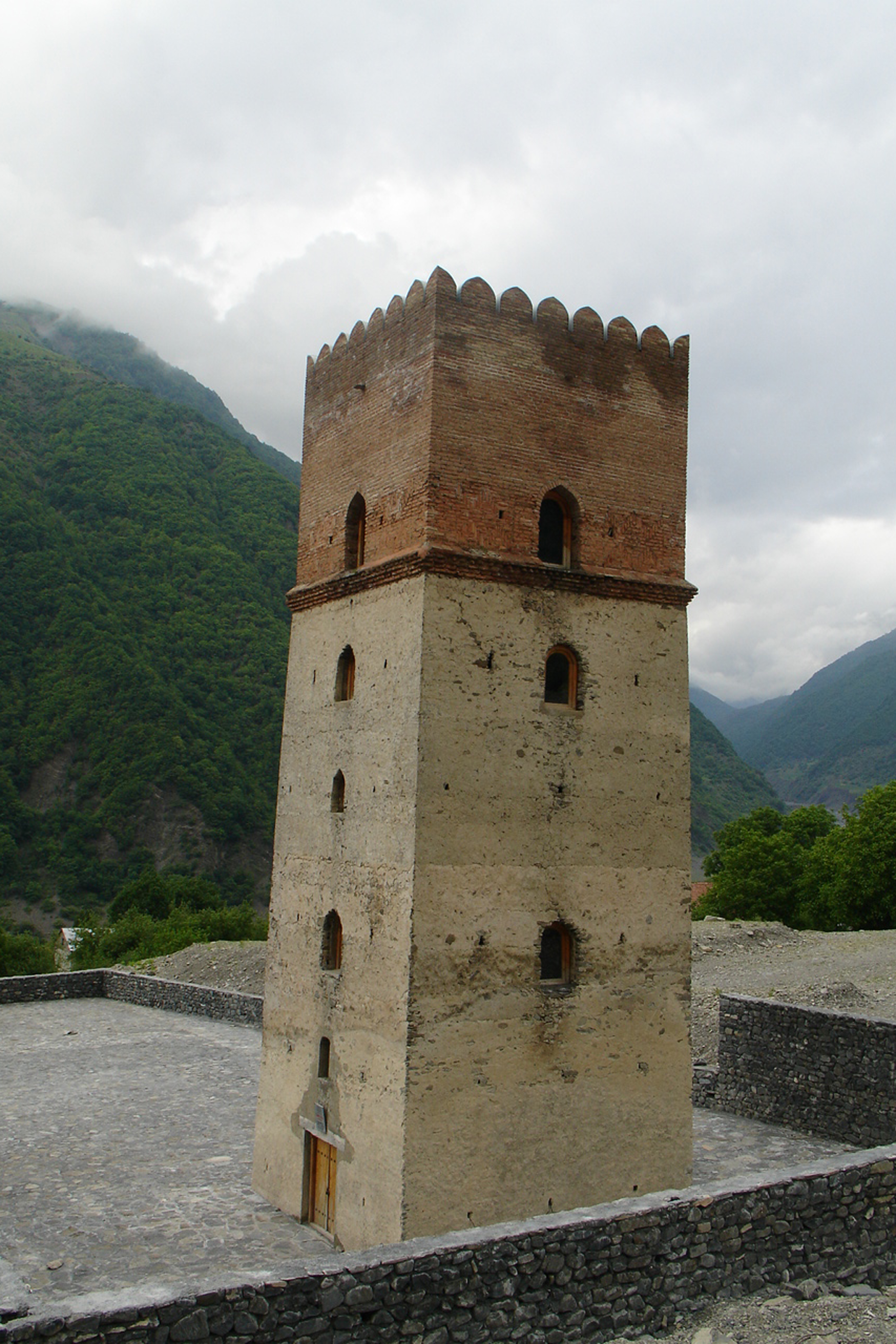

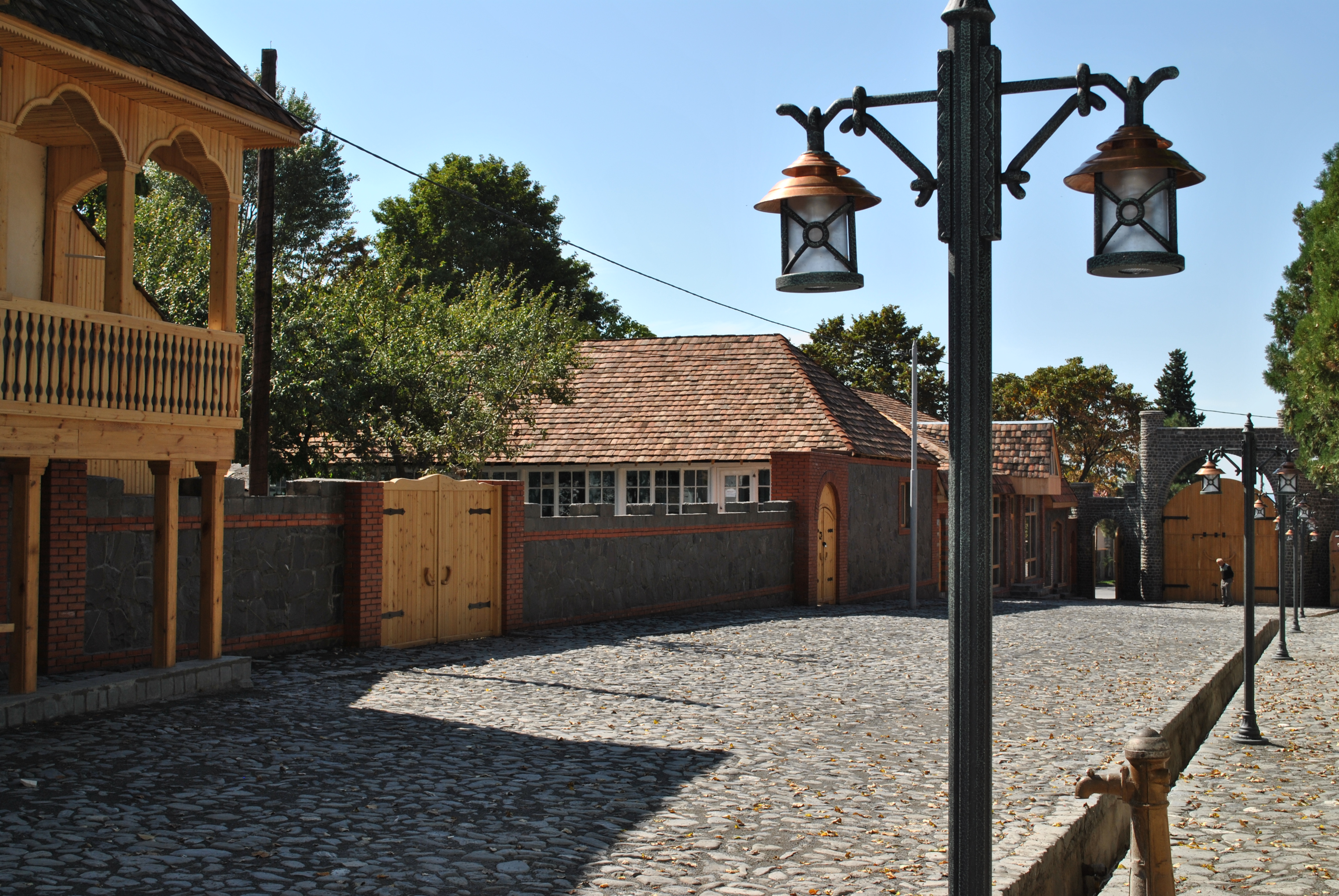

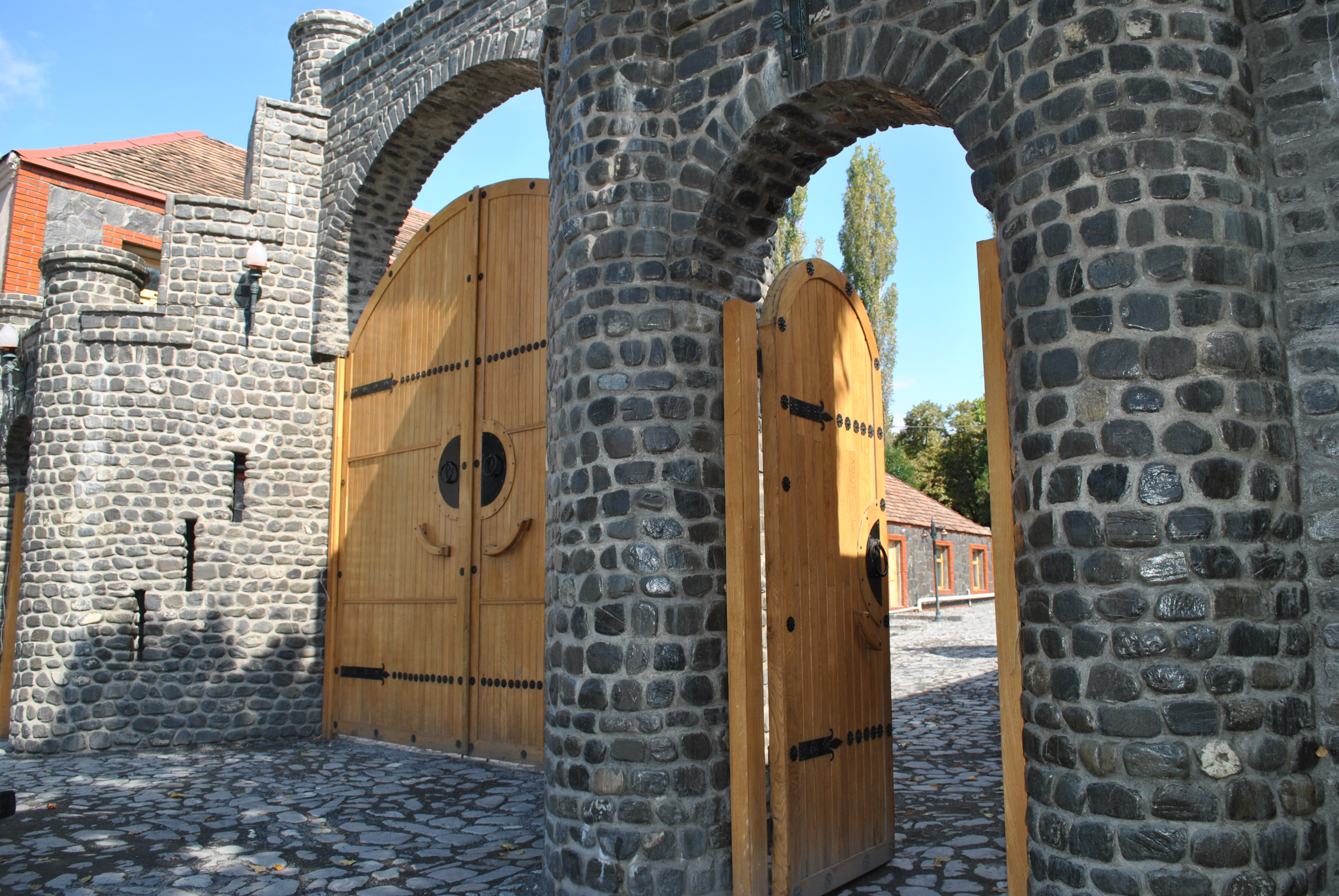

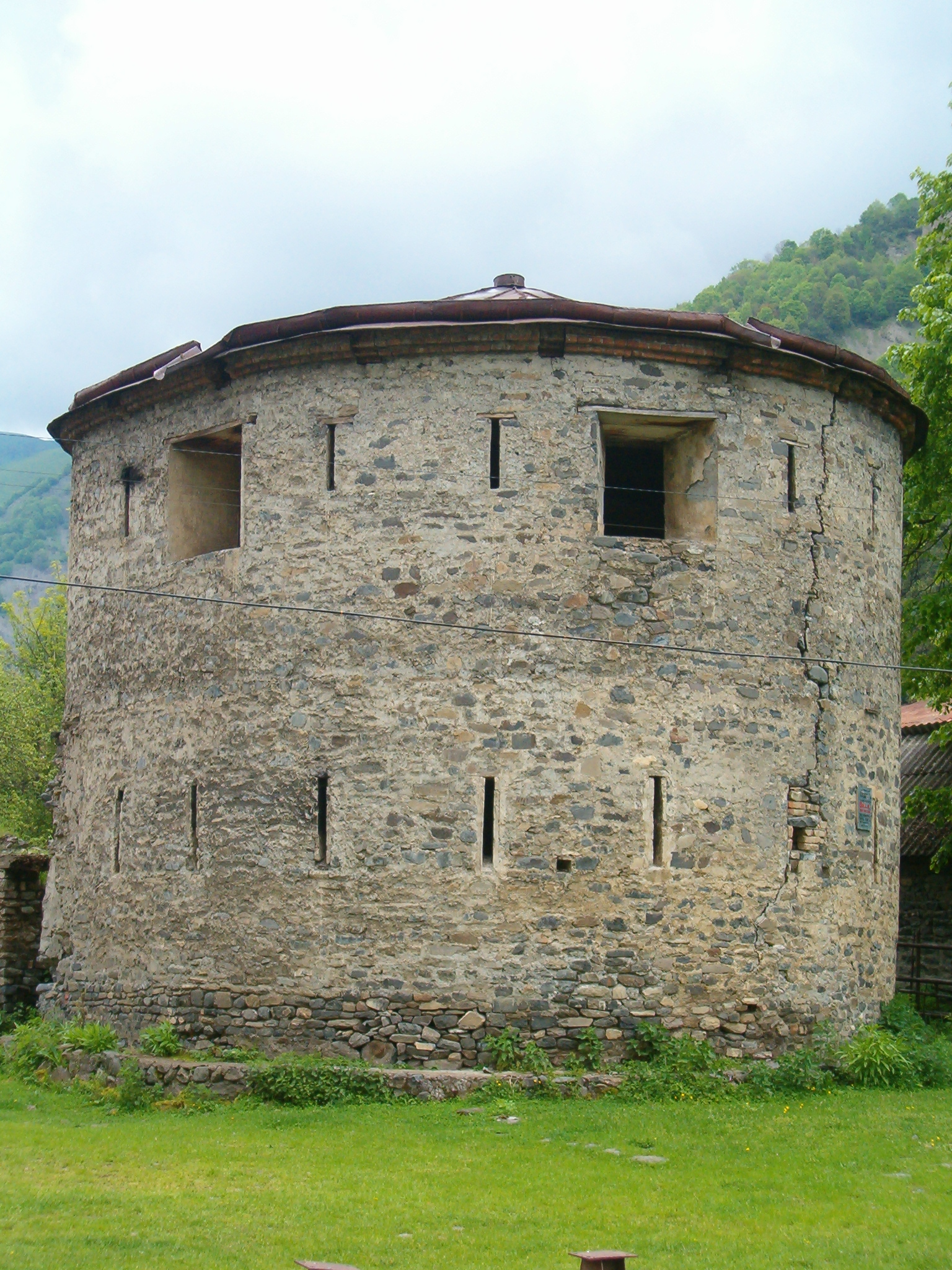

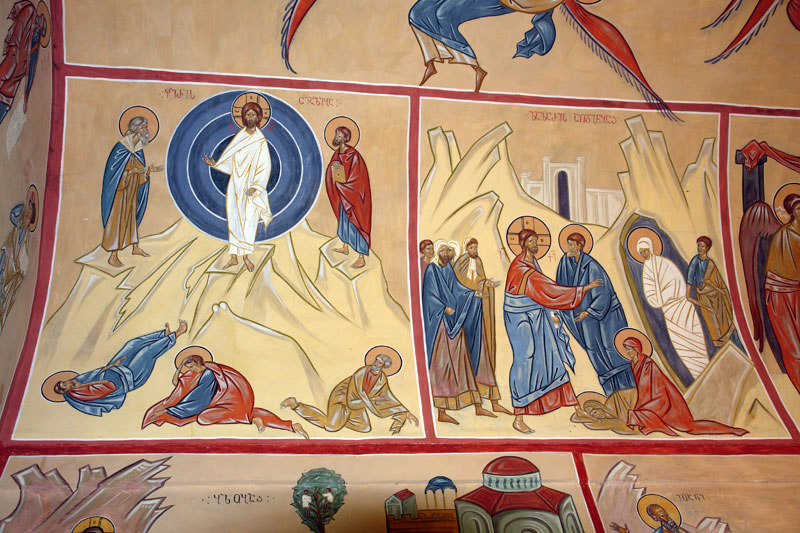
Fresco in St. George's Church

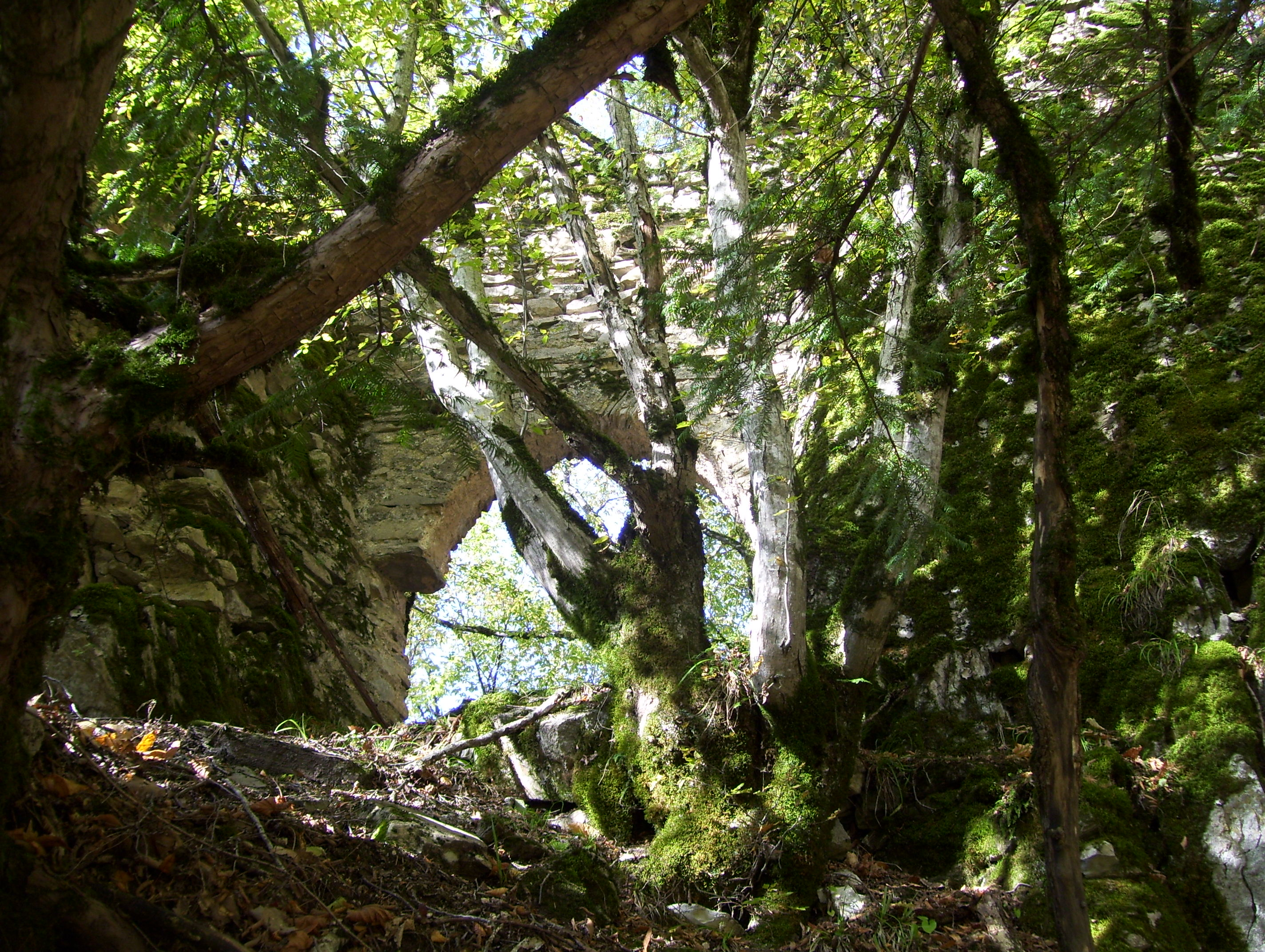

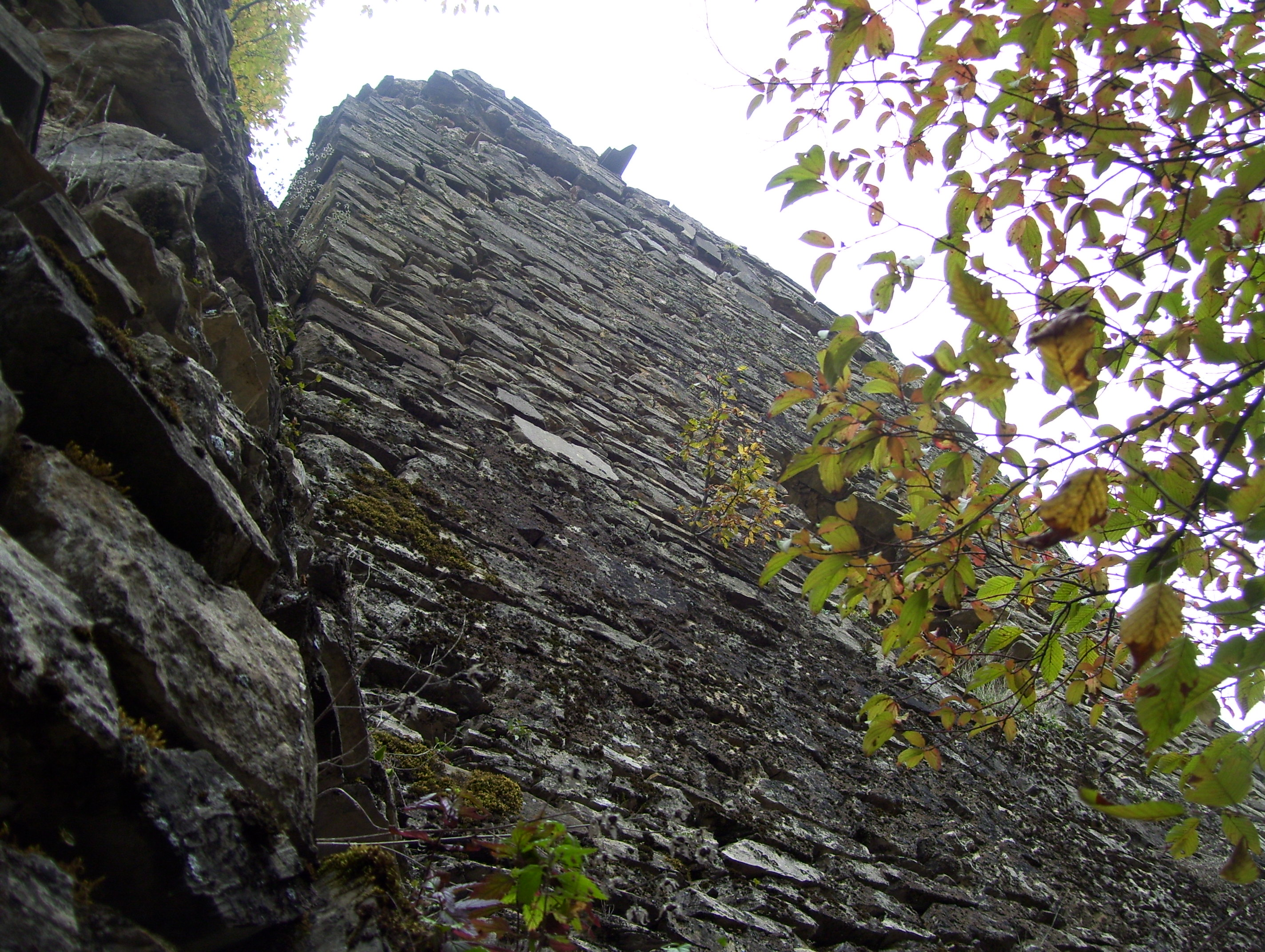

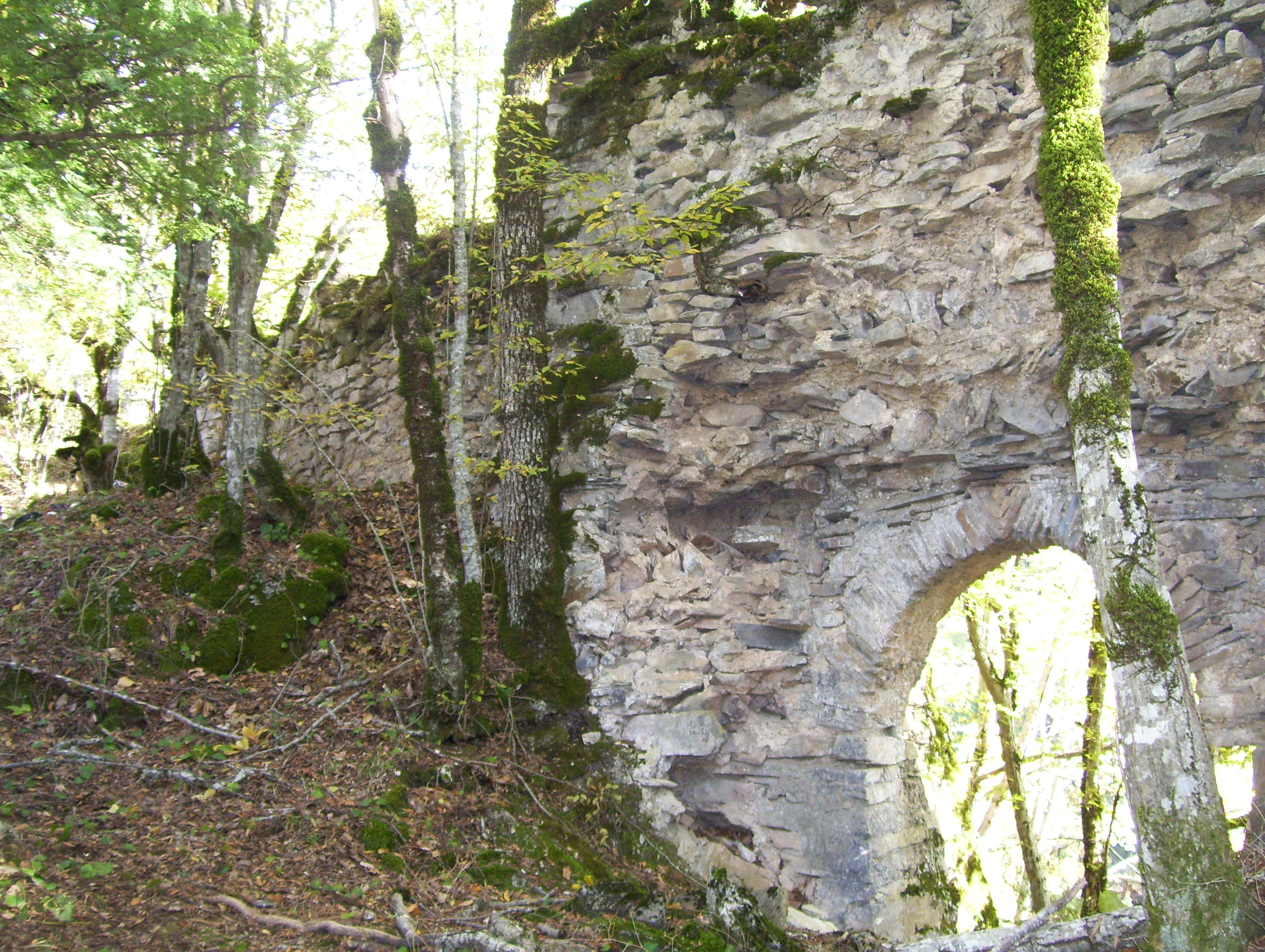

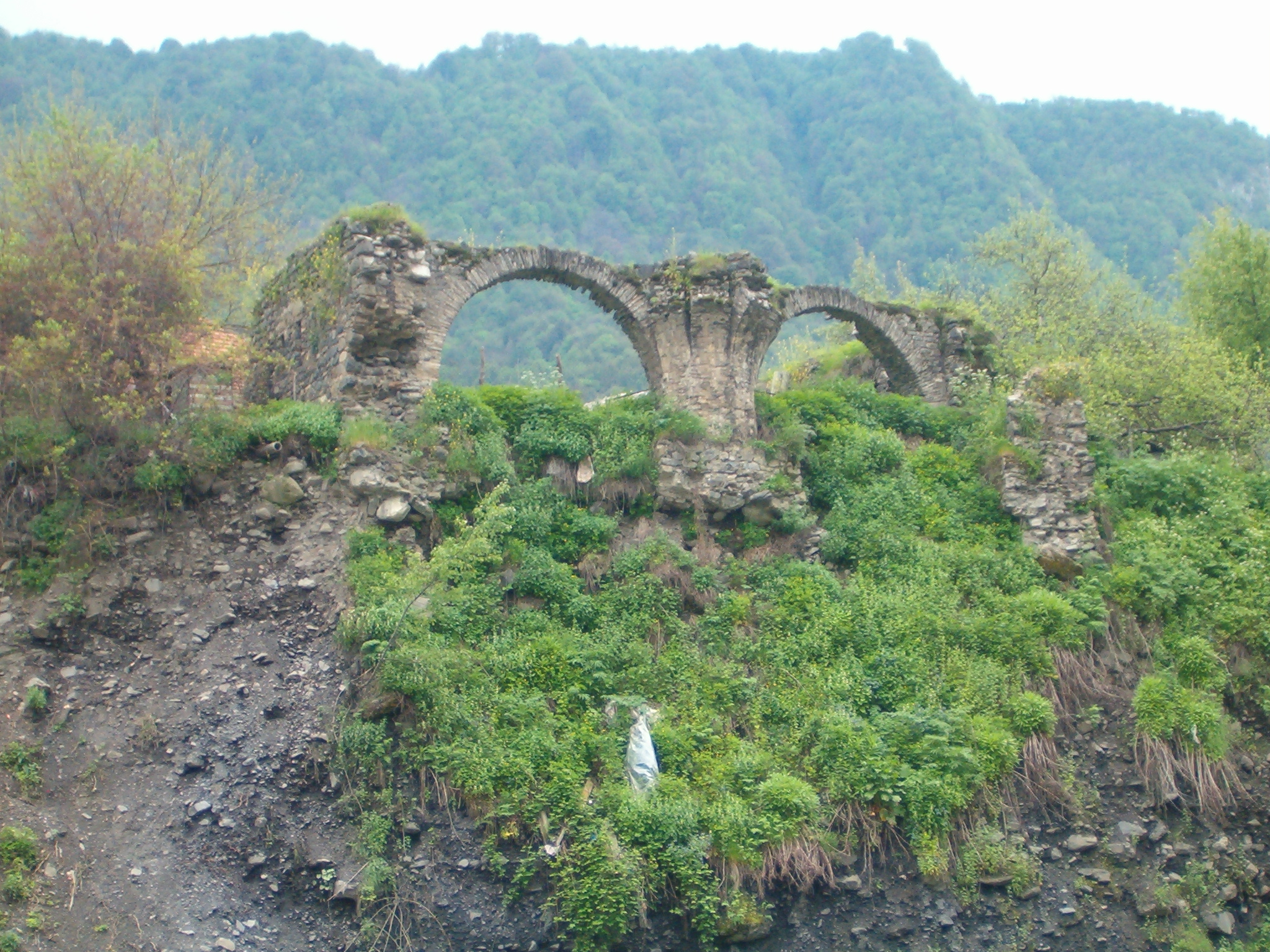

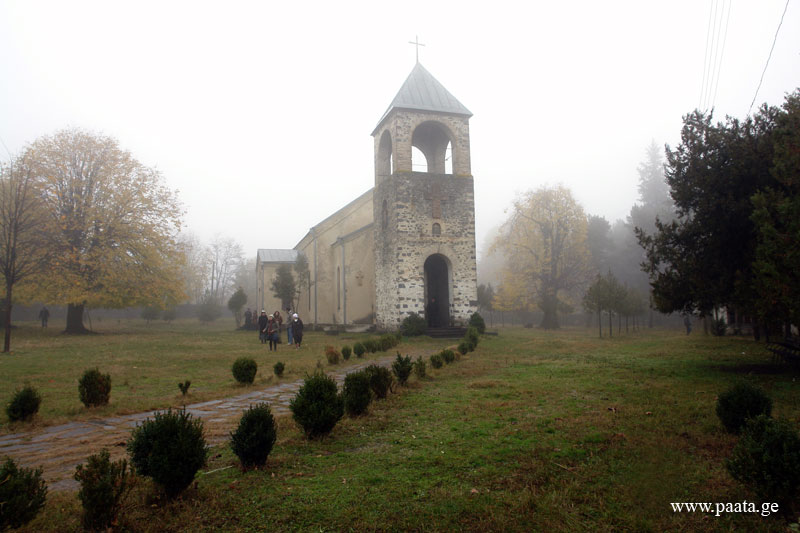
St.George's Church

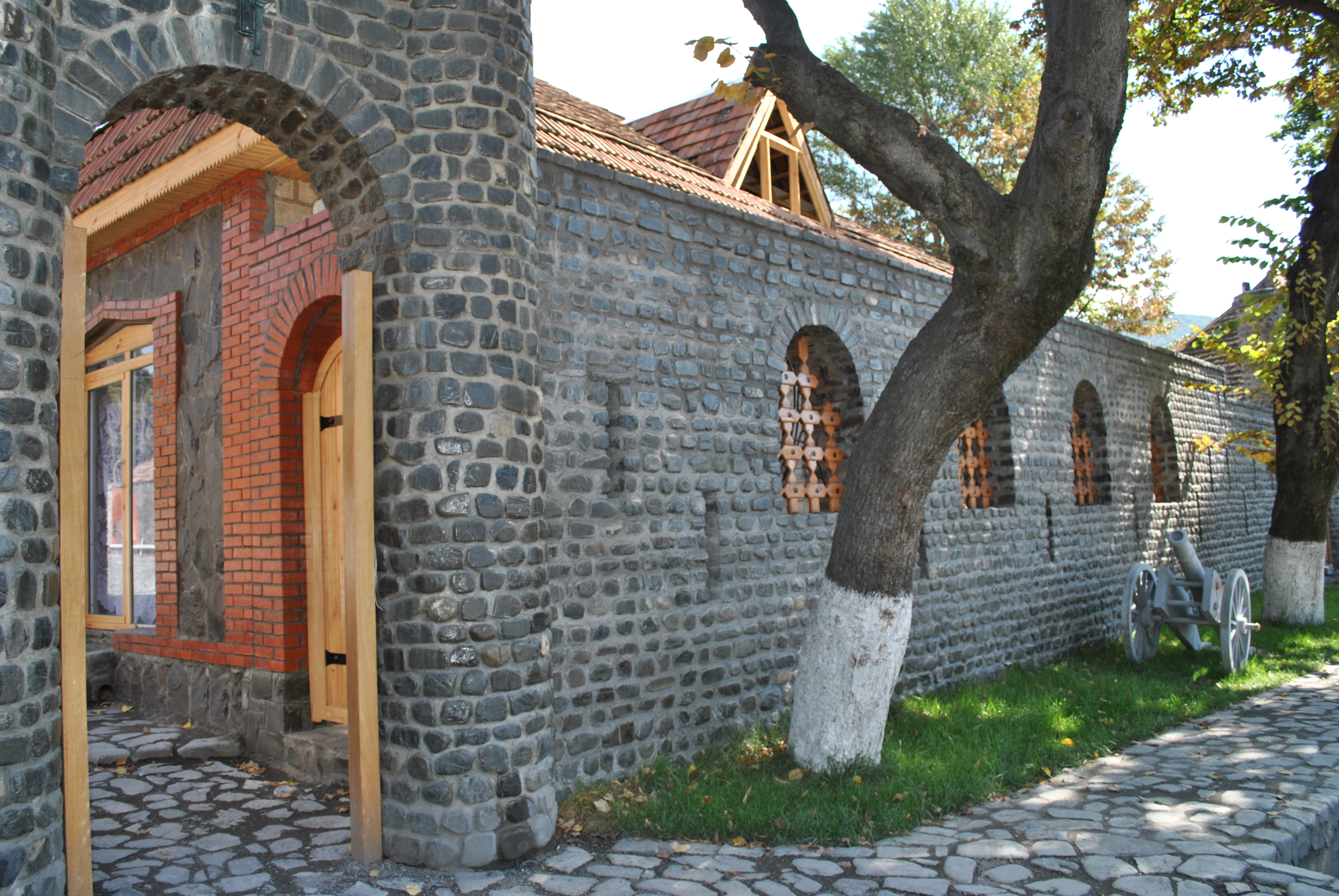

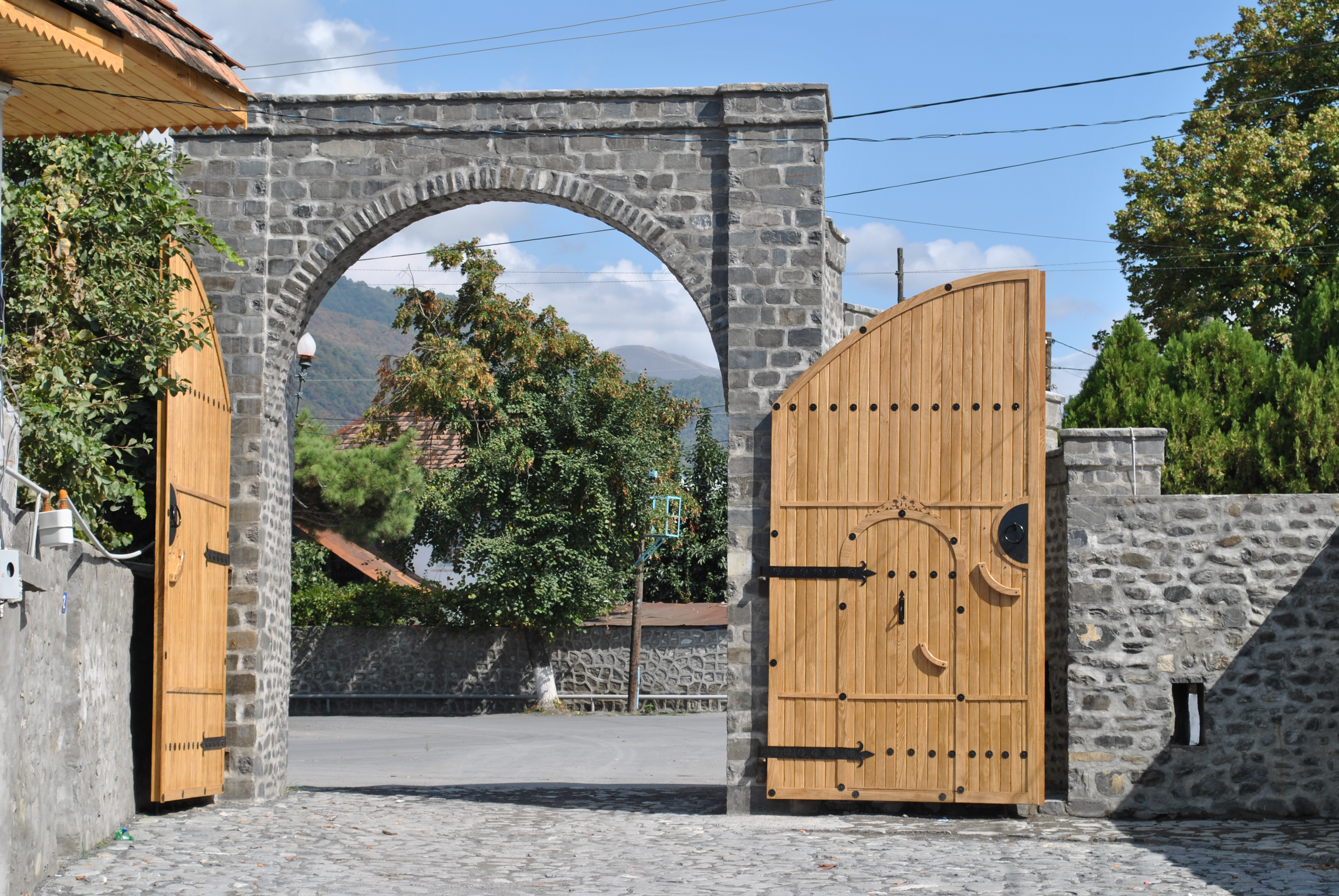
