= Stillo =

Stillo is a surname. Notable people with the surname include:

- Luigi Stillo (born 1984), Italian footballer
- Roberto Stillo (born 1991), Canadian soccer player

== See also ==
- Jenny Palacios-Stillo (born 1960), Honduran cross-country skier
- Stello
- Stillo Island, an island of Albania
