= Round Temple =

Round Temple may refer to:

- Tholos (architecture)
- Temple of Vesta
- Temple of Vesta, Tivoli
- Tholos of Delphi
- Rotunda
- Temple of Hercules Victor
- The "Tempio Rotondo" in Ostia Antica
- Three Saints Church (Shaki)
