= Three Saints =

The Three Saints are the Three Holy Hierarchs of Eastern Christianity.

Three Saints may also refer to:

- Three Saints (peaks), mountain group in California
- Three Saints Bay, an inlet in Kodiak Island, Alaska
- Three Saints Harbor, Alaska in the Three Saints Bay
- Russian ship Three Saints, the namesake of the bay and the harbor
- Three Saints Church (Shaki), a church building in Shaki, Azerbaijan
- Llantrisant ("Parish of the Three Saints"), a town in Wales
- Sam Sing Kung Temple, also known as the Three Saints Temple, a Chinese temple in Sabah, Malaysia

== See also ==
- List of Eastern Orthodox saint titles
- Russian ship Trekh Ierarkhov (1838)
- Russian ship Tri Sviatitelia
