= Tivoli, Lazio =

Comune in Lazio, Italy

Tivoli
- Comune
- Comune di Tivoli
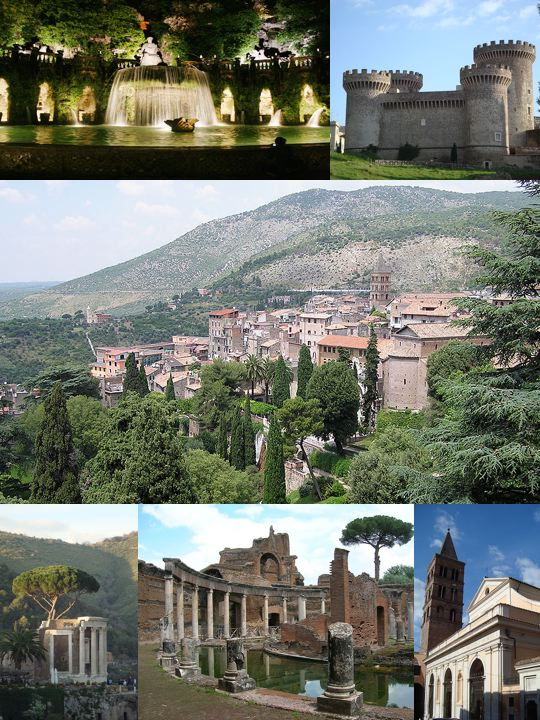
- Left from top: Villa d'Este Fountain, Rocca Pia, View of Villa d'Este, Temple of Vesta, Hadrian's Villa, Tivoli Cathedral

- Flag Coat of arms

- Location within Lazio Location within Italy
- Coordinates: 41°57′35″N 12°47′53″E
- Country: Italy
- Region: Lazio
- Metropolitan city: Rome (RM)
- Roman establishment: 338 BC

Area
  - Total: 68.65 km^{2} (26.51 sq mi)
- Elevation: 235 m (771 ft)

Population (31 October 2021)
  - Total: 54,939
  - Density: 800.3/km^{2} (2,073/sq mi)
- Demonym: Tiburtini
- Time zone: UTC+1 (CET)
  - Summer (DST): UTC+2 (CEST)
- Postal code: 00019
- Dialing code: 0774
- Patron saint: San Lorenzo
- Saint day: 10 August
- Website: Official website

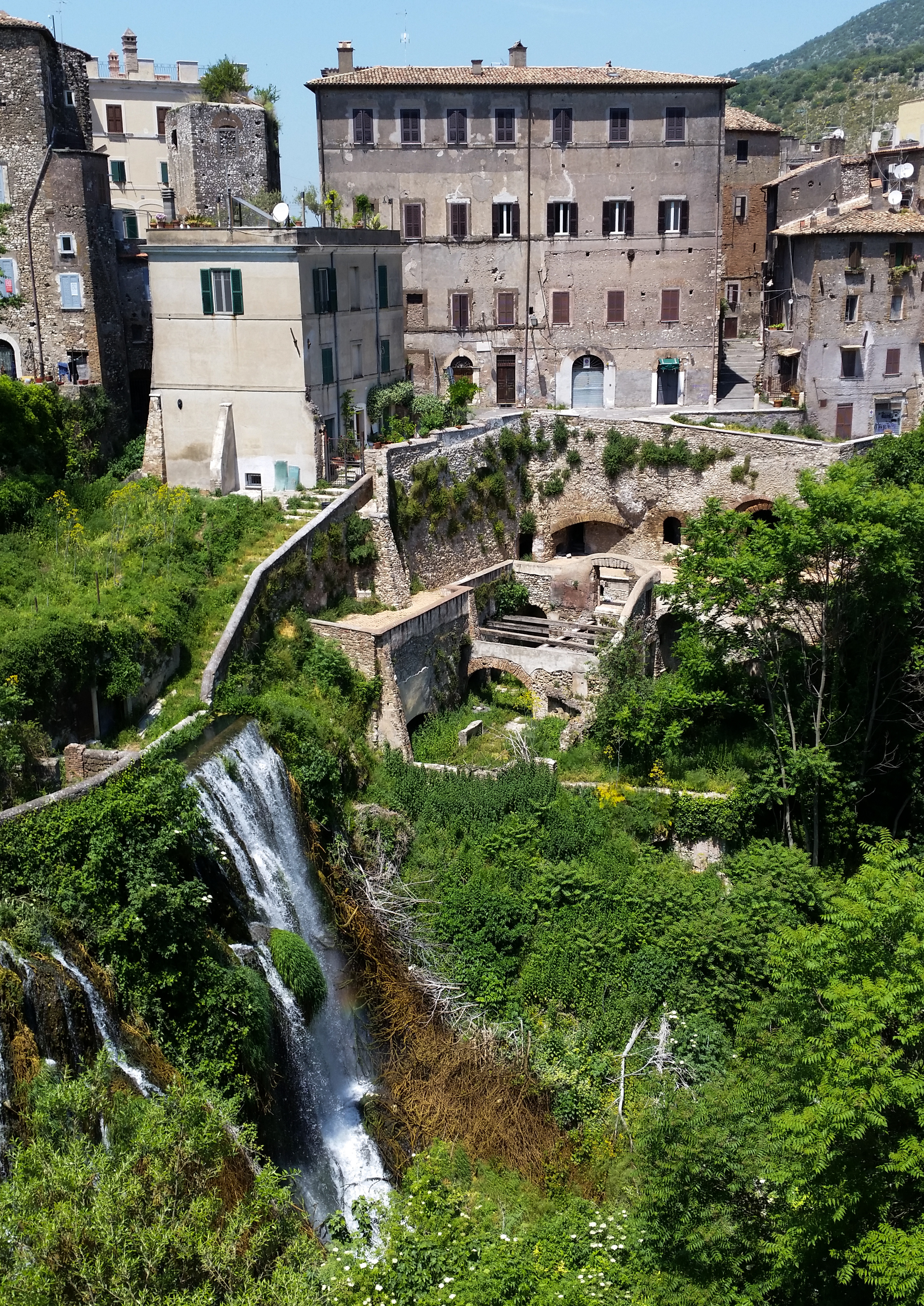
Detail from the Villa Gregoriana

Tivoli (/ˈtɪvəli/ TIV-ə-lee; Italian: [ˈtiːvoli]; Latin: Tibur) is a town and comune in Lazio, Central Italy, 30 kilometres (19 miles) north-east of the city centre of Rome, at the falls of the Aniene river where it issues from the Sabine Hills. The city offers a wide view over the Roman Campagna.

== History ==
Gaius Julius Solinus cites Cato the Elder's lost Origines for the story that the city of Tibur was founded by Catillus the Arcadian, a son of Amphiaraus, who came there having escaped the slaughter at Thebes, Greece. Catillus and his three sons Tiburtus, Coras, and Catillus (Note: In the Aeneid, Virgil makes Coras and the younger Catillus twin brothers and the leaders of a Tiburtine military force in support of Turnus.) drove out the Siculi from the Aniene plateau and founded a city they named Tibur in honor of Tiburtus. According to another account, Tibur was a colony of Alba Longa. Historical traces of settlement in the area date back to the thirteenth century BC. Tibur may share a common root with the river Tiber and the Latin praenomen Tiberius.

From Etruscan times Tibur, a Sabine city, was the seat of the Tiburtine Sibyl. There are two small temples above the falls, the rotunda traditionally associated with Vesta and the rectangular one with the Sibyl of Tibur, whom Varro calls Albunea, the water nymph who was worshipped on the banks of the Aniene as a tenth Sibyl added to the nine mentioned by the Greek writers. In the nearby woods, Faunus had a sacred grove. During the Roman age, Tibur maintained a certain importance, being on the way (the Via Tiburtina, extended as the Via Valeria) that Romans had to follow to cross the mountain regions of the Apennines towards the Abruzzo, the region were lived some of its fiercest enemies such as Volsci, Sabines, and Samnites.

=== Roman age ===
At first an independent ally of Rome, Tibur allied itself with the Gauls in 361 BC. Vestiges remain of its defensive walls of this period, in opus quadratum. In 338 BC, however, Tibur was defeated and absorbed by the Romans. The city acquired Roman citizenship in 90 BC and became a resort area famed for its beauty and its good water, and was enriched by many Roman villas. The most famous one, of which the ruins remain, is the Villa Adriana (Hadrian's Villa). Maecenas and Augustus also had villas at Tibur, and the poet Horace had a modest villa: he and Catullus and Statius all mention Tibur in their poems. In 273, Zenobia, the captive queen of Palmyra, was assigned a residence here by the Emperor Aurelian. The second-century temple of Hercules Victor is being excavated. The present Piazza del Duomo occupies the Roman forum.

In 547, in the course of the Gothic War, the city was fortified by the Byzantine general Belisarius, but was later destroyed by Totila's army. After the end of the war it became a Byzantine duchy, later absorbed into the Patrimony of St. Peter. After Italy was conquered by Charlemagne, Tivoli was under the authority of a count, representing the emperor.

==== Roman gentes with origins in Tibur ====
- Coponia (gens)
- Cossinia (gens)
- Rabiria gens
- Rubellia gens

=== Middle Ages ===
From the tenth century onwards, Tivoli, as an independent commune governed by its elected consuls, was the fiercest rival of Rome in the struggle for the control over the impoverished central Lazio. Emperor Otto III conquered it in 1001, and Tivoli fell under the papal control. Tivoli however managed to keep a level of independence until the 15th century: symbols of the city's strength were the Palace of Arengo, the Torre del Comune and the church of St. Michael, all built in this period, as well as the new line of walls (authorized in 1155), needed to house the increasing population. Reminders of the internal turbulence of communal life are the tower houses that may be seen in Vicolo dei Ferri, Via di Postera, Via del Seminario and Via del Colle.

In the 13th century, Rome imposed a tribute on the city and gave itself the right to appoint a count to govern it in conjunction with the local consuls. In the fourteenth century, Tivoli sided with the Guelphs and strongly supported Urban VI against Antipope Clement VII. King Ladislaus of Naples was twice repulsed from the city, as was the condottiero Braccio da Montone.

In the city, there was also a Jewish community.

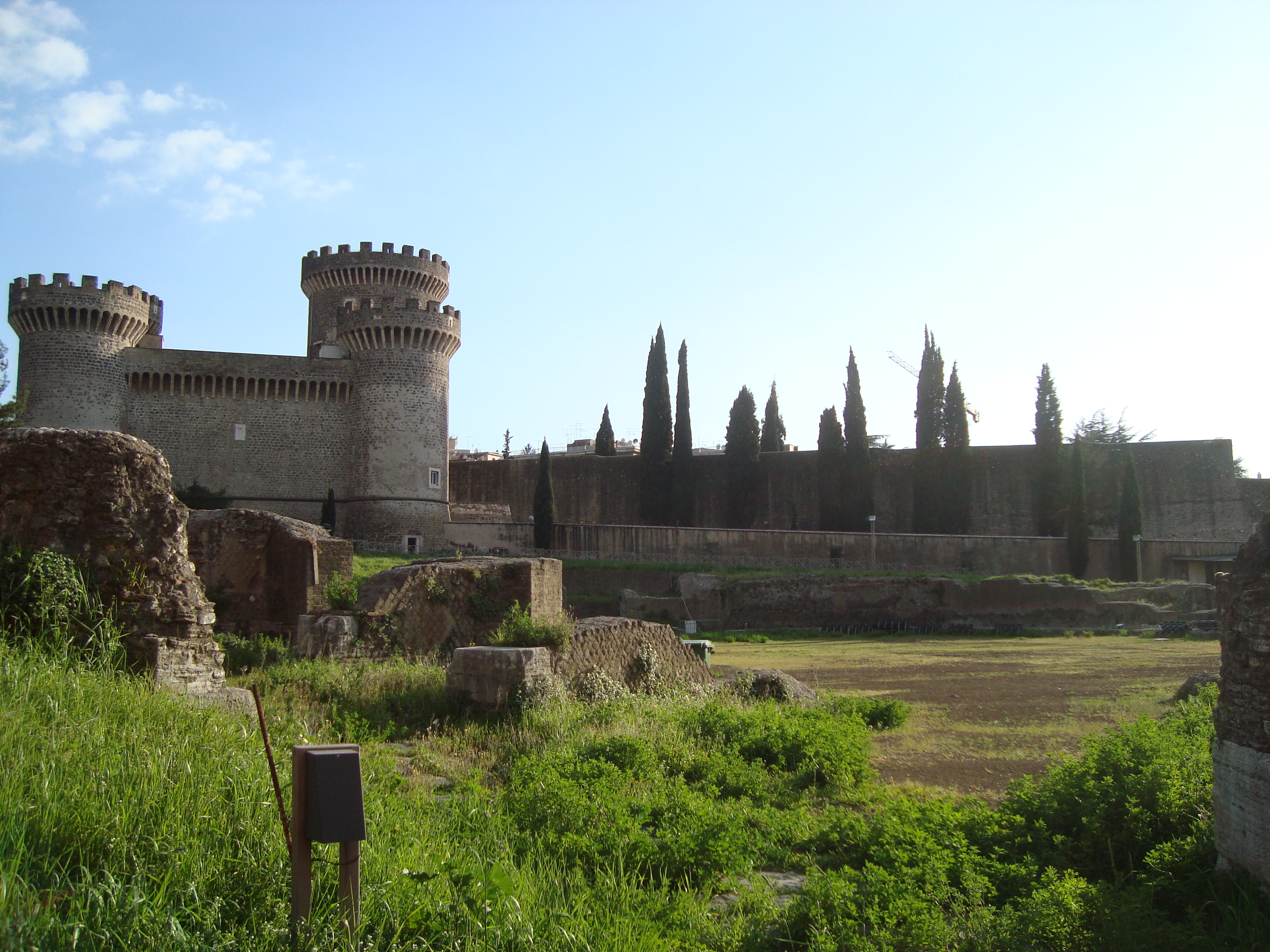
The castle of Rocca Pia, built in 1461 by Pope Pius II, and the Roman amphitheatre

=== Renaissance ===
During the Renaissance, popes and cardinals did not limit their embellishment program to Rome; they also erected buildings in Tivoli. In 1461, Pope Pius II built the massive Rocca Pia to control the always restive population, and as a symbol of the permanence of papal temporal power here.

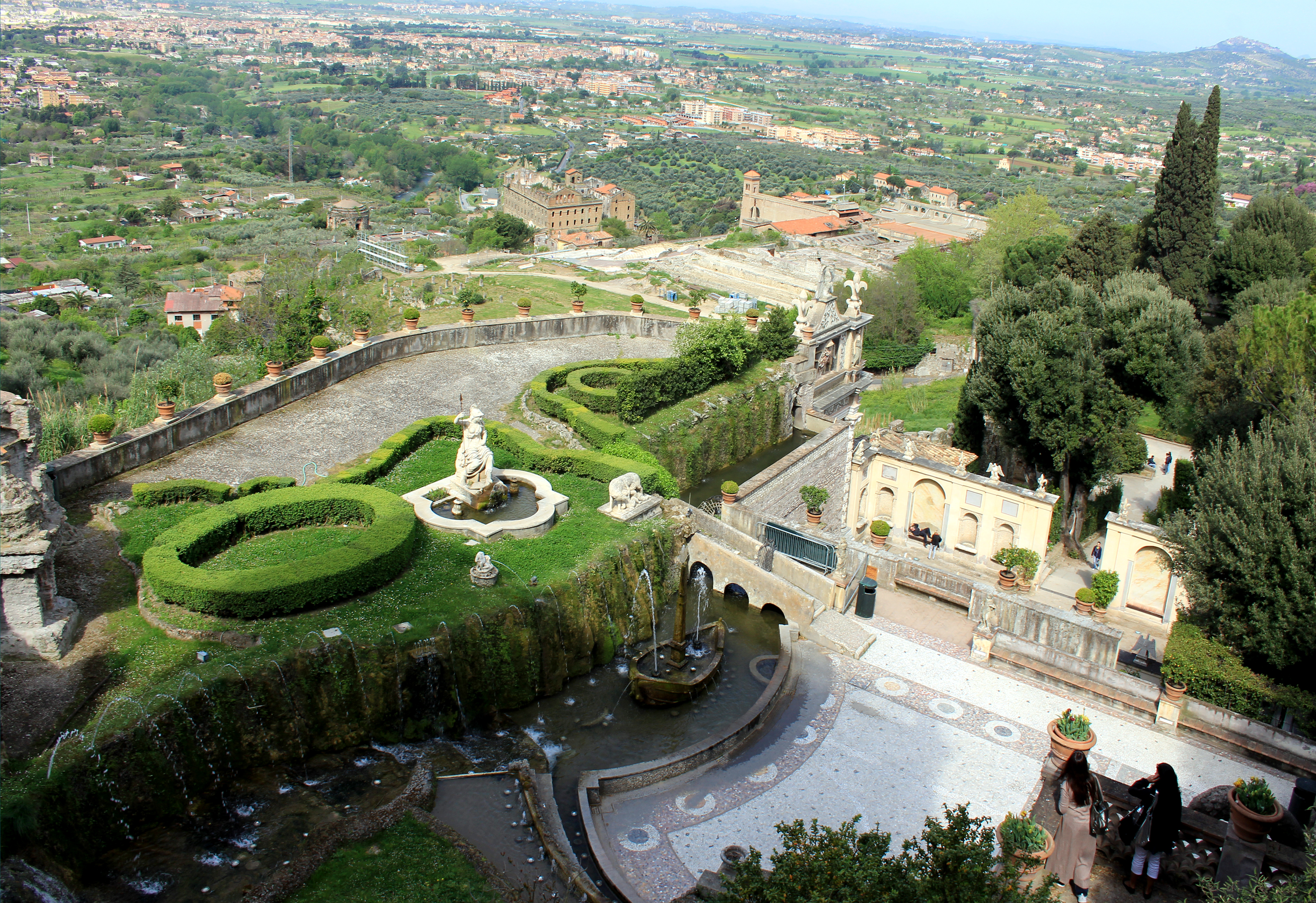
View of the World Heritage park of Villa d'Este in Tivoli

From the sixteenth century, the city saw further construction of villas. The most famous of these is the Villa d'Este, a World Heritage Site. Its construction was started in 1550 by Pirro Ligorio for Cardinal Ippolito II d'Este. The villa was richly decorated with frescoes by painters of late Roman Mannerism, such as Girolamo Muziano, Livio Agresti (a member of the "Forlì painting school") or Federico Zuccari. In 1527, Tivoli was sacked by bands of the supporters of the HRR emperor Charles V and the Colonna family, important archives being destroyed during the attack. In 1547, it was again occupied, by the Duke of Alba in a war against Paul IV, and in 1744 by the Austrians.

In 1835, Pope Gregory XVI added the Villa Gregoriana, a villa complex pivoting around the Aniene's falls. The "Great Waterfall" was created through a tunnel in the Monte Catillo, to give an outlet to the waters of the Aniene sufficient to preserve the city from inundations like the devastating flood of 1826.

=== Modern times ===
In 1944, Tivoli suffered heavy damage under an Allied bombing, which destroyed the Jesuit Church of Jesus.

== Main sights ==
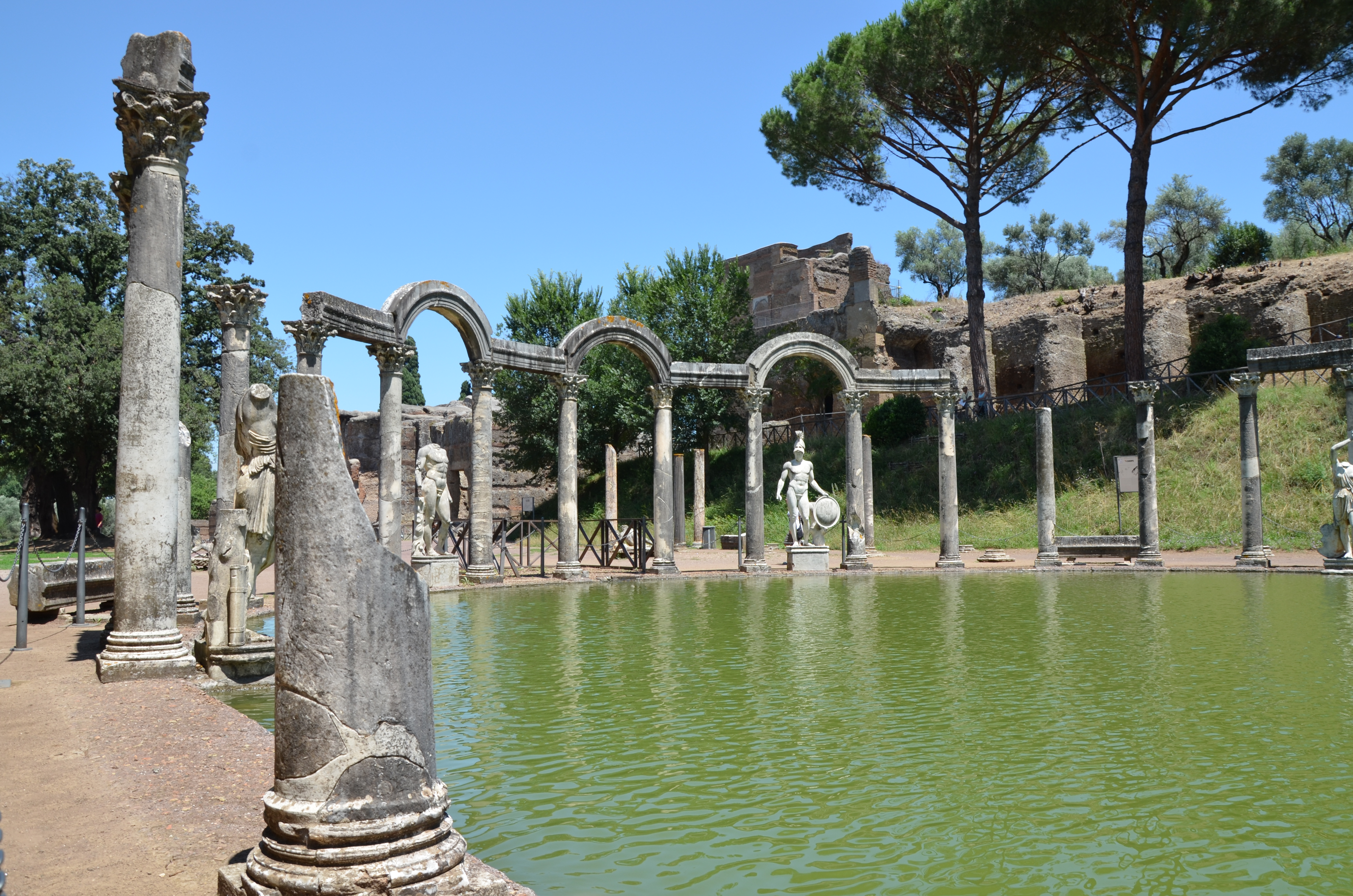
Remains of Hadrian's villa

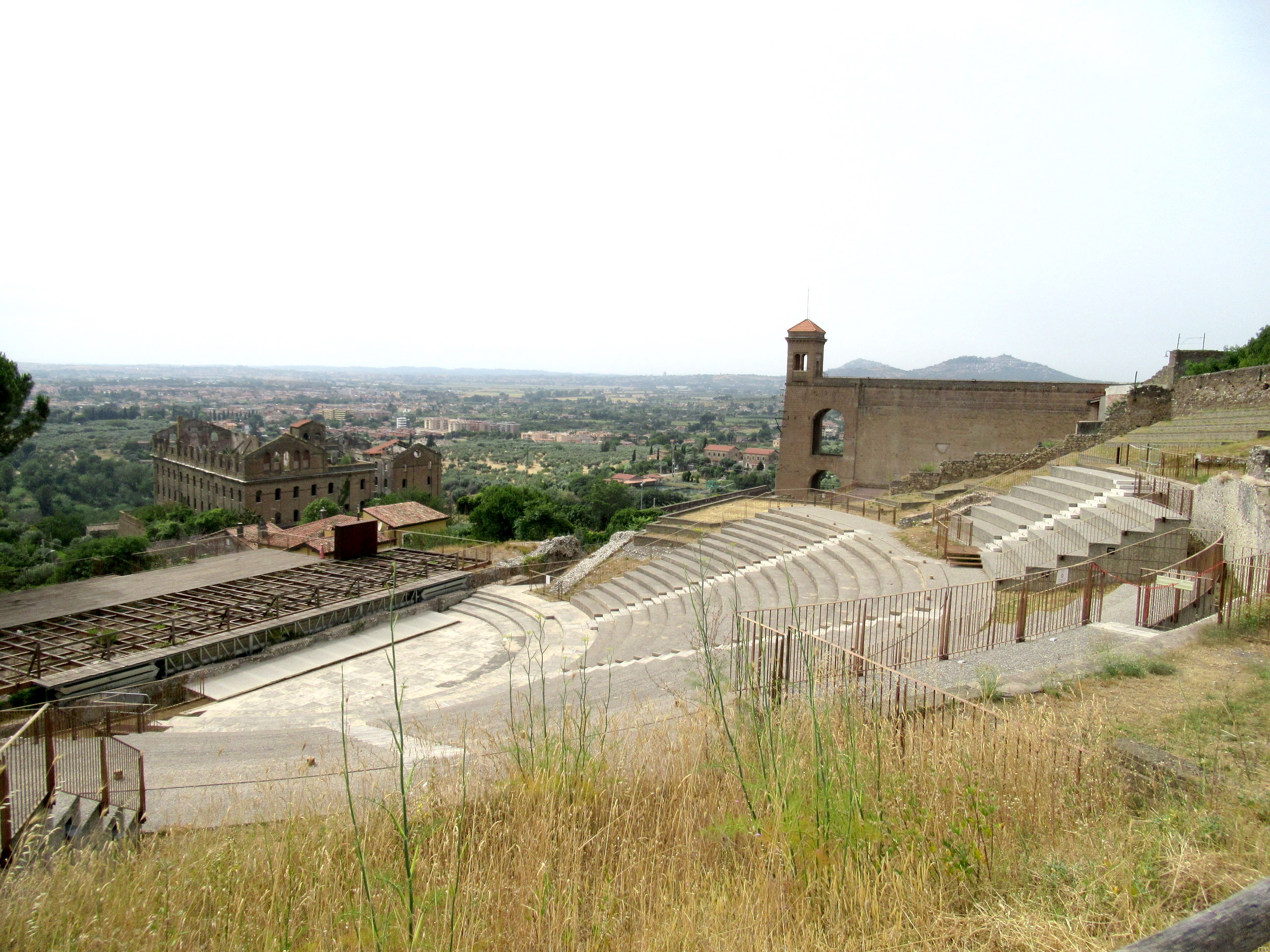
Theatre of Hercules Victor

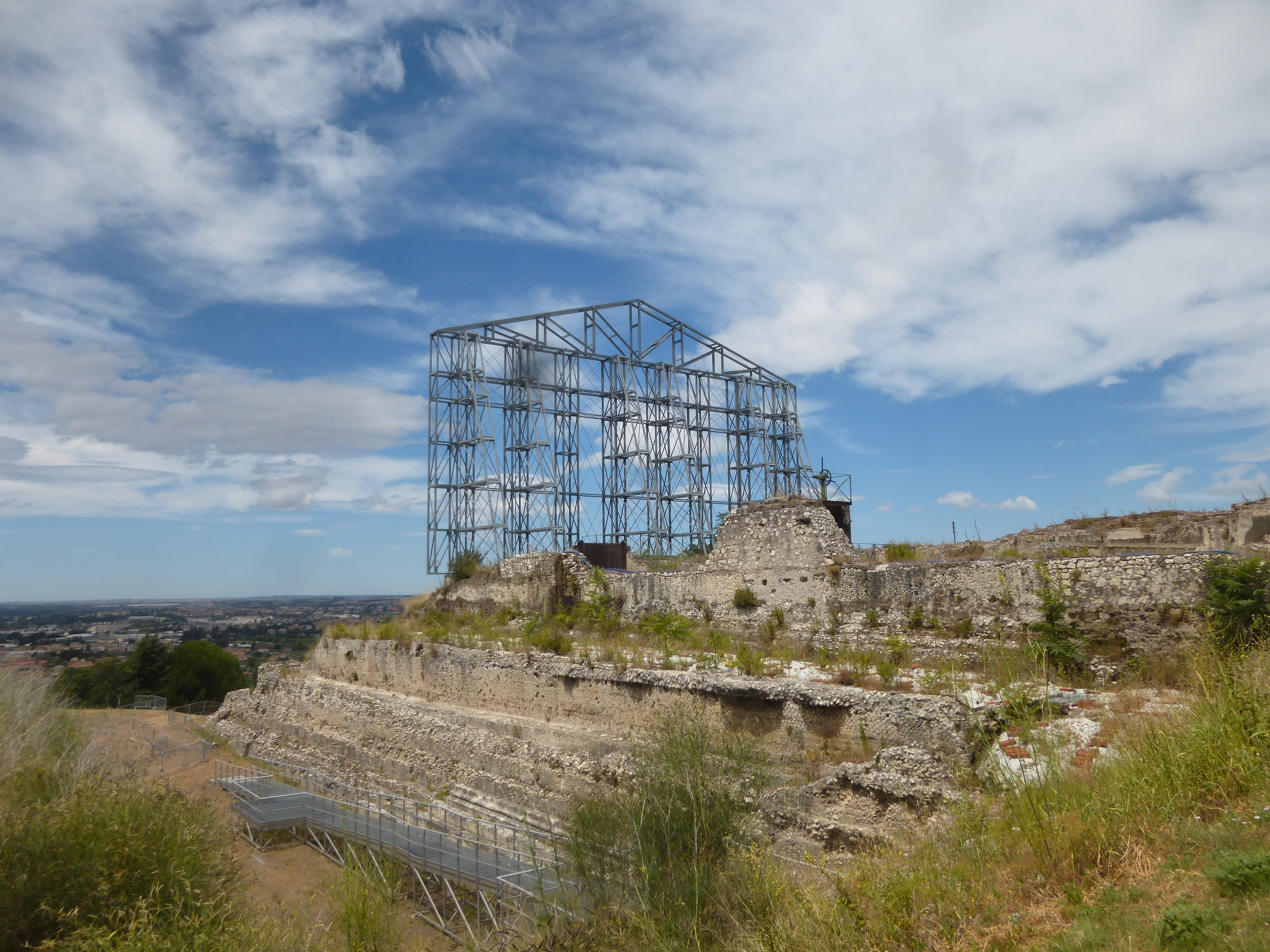
Temple of Hercules Victor

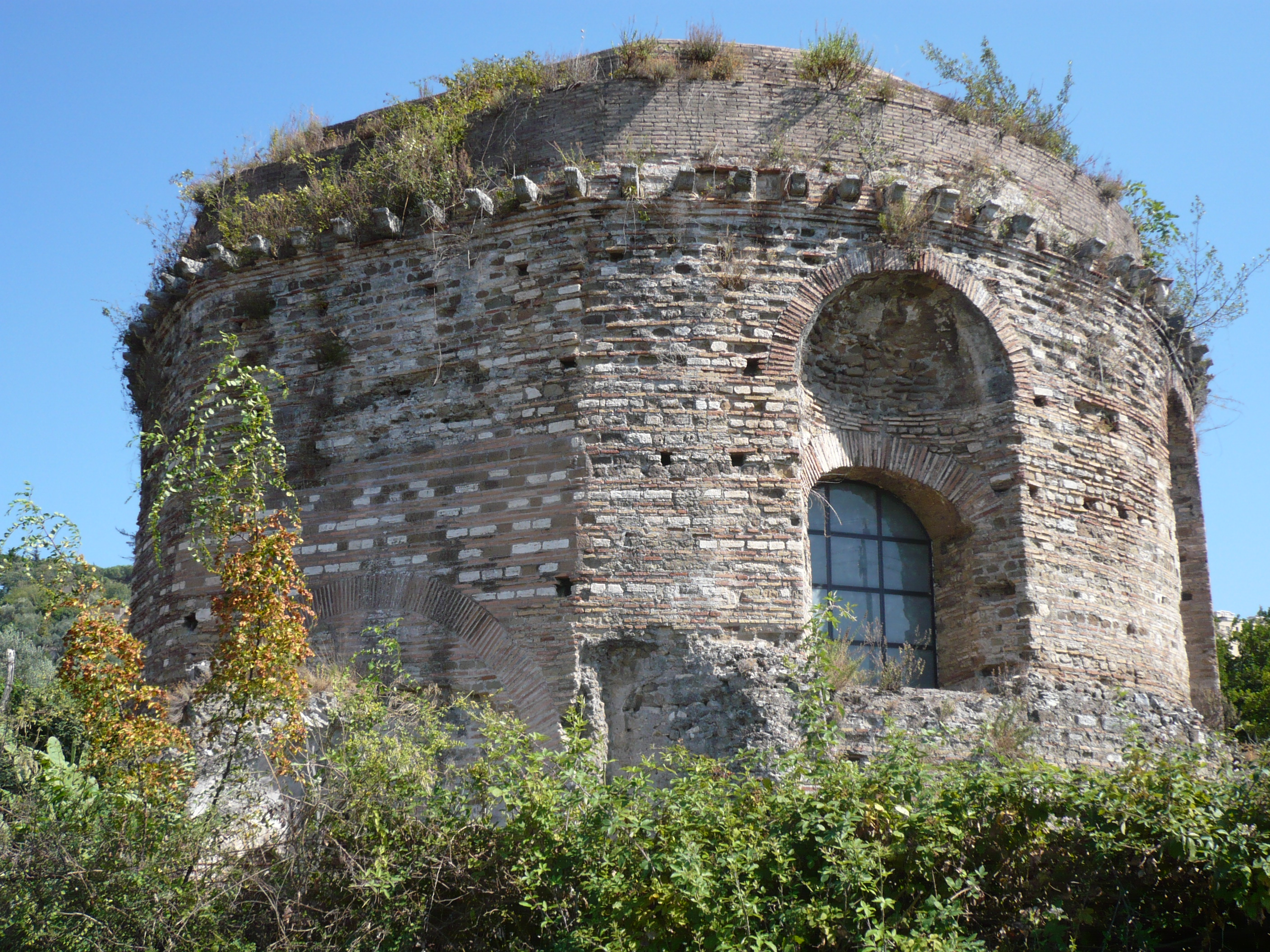
Upper part of the Temple of the Tosse

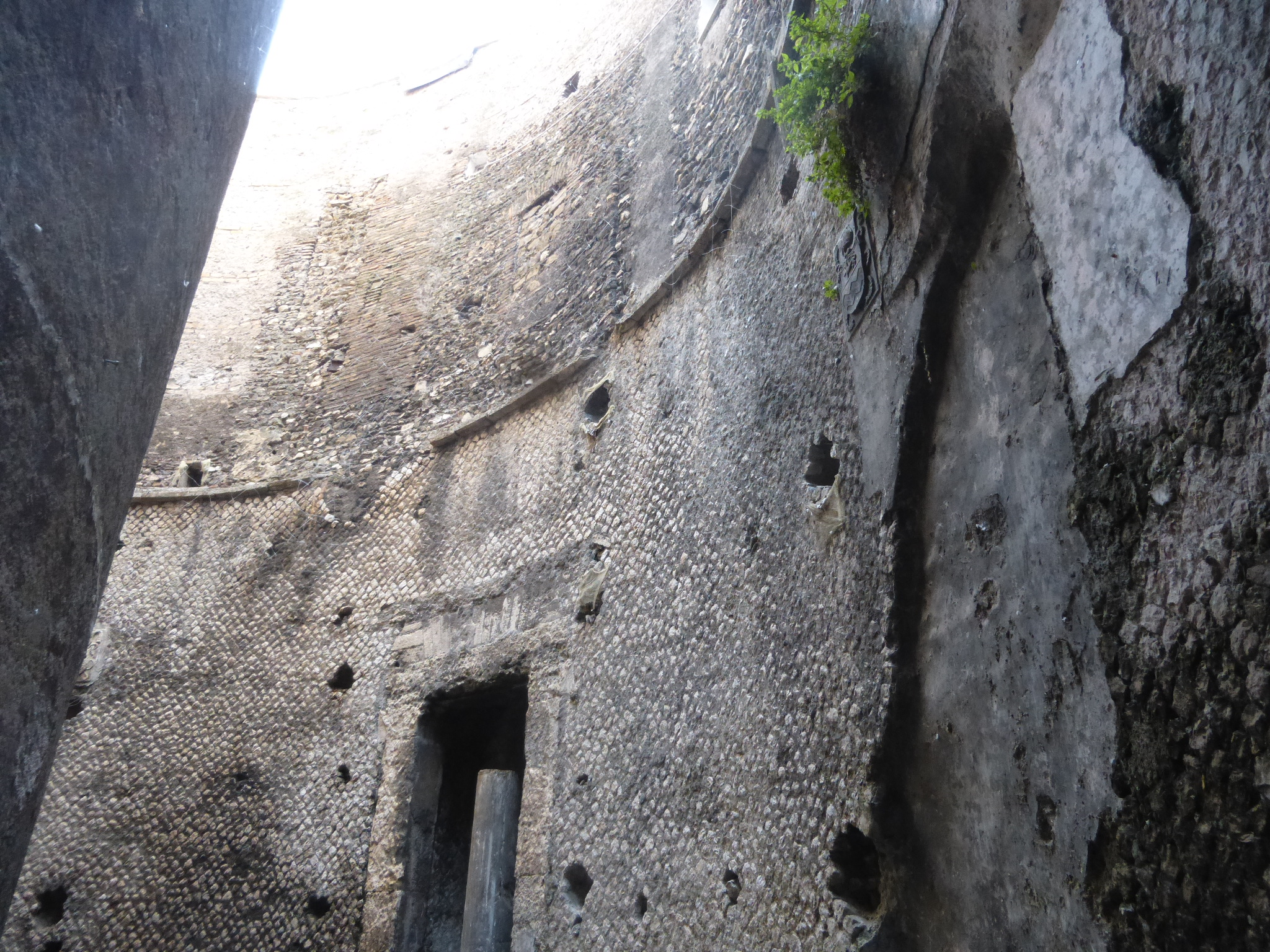
Apse of the Roman basilica of the Forum

=== Archaeological sites ===
- Hadrian's Villa, Unesco World Heritage;
- Sanctuary of Hercules Victor (second century BC) was one of the largest structures in central Italy at the time, and was located outside the ancient city, across the road leading to Rome and Samnium. Measuring 188 by 140 metres (617 by 459 ft), it included a theatre, a large porticoed square and the temple. It was reached through a series of terraces, in a similar fashion to the Sanctuary of Fortuna Primigenia in Palestrina. The sanctuary also housed one of the more frequented council of musicians in Roman Italy;
- Roman amphitheatre of Blaesus of first half of the second century AD, coincided with the construction of Hadrian's monumental villa not far away. It held about 6,000 spectators. An inscription (CIL XIV, 4259) gives the benefactor, M. Tullius Blaesus;
- Cryptoporticus (below Piazza Tani);
- Mensa Ponderaria and Sacello di Augusto;
- Roman age bridge (Viale Roma);
- Ponte Lucano and Plauzi Mausoleum;
- Porta Maior (Via del Colle);
- San Pietro alla Carità Romanesque architecture Catholic Church of Tivoli, Lazio;
- Circular Temple of Vesta on the acropolis, (probably of the Sibyl);
- Rectangular Temple of "Tiburtine Sibyl" (probably of Tiburno). It was built in the second century BC on an artificial platform in the acropolis. Characterized by Ionic columns (only two of which remain today), it measures 15.90 by 9.15 metres (52.2 by 30.0 ft). The interior was decorated by frescoes and stuccoes, now lost;
- Tomb of the Vestal Virgin Cossinia;
- Villa of the Pisoni;
- Villa known as of Brutus; 1km south of Tivoli centre on the road to San Gregorio are the remains of this large terraced late Republican villa supported by double cryptoportici around a central area of several spacious rooms. Many fountains were used in the design;
- Villa known as of Cassius;
- Villa of Manlius Vopiscus (Villa Gregoriana);
- Villa of Quintilius Varus;
- Roman so-called Temple della Tosse, located on the ancient via Tiburtina near the Temple of Hercules and the Villa d'Este. It is a circular structure with a hole in the 12-metre (39 ft) diameter dome. From the discovery of a plaque it seems that the building was built in the first half of the fourth century during the reign of Constantine I, on the ruins of a Roman villa of the first century BC, to commemorate the works carried out on the Via Tiburtina. Several hypotheses have been advanced, including that it was a nymphaeum, a temple dedicated to Venus or the Sun or a tomb of the gens Tuscia, from which the current name would later derive. The dome is similar to that of the Pantheon (i.e. with an oculus). The central brick body is divided into two levels, one older on which the entrances were located, the other above on which there are three large rectangular niches and four semicircular niches. In ancient times it was covered with marble, as evidenced by the fixing holes. It rests on a base of opus reticulatum of the villa from the 1st century BC and of reused material from ancient buildings;
- Roman basilica of the forum in the cathedral.

=== Other sites ===
- Villa d'Este, part of the UNESCO World Heritage Site list since 2001;
- Villa Gregoriana;
- Rocca Pia, a fortress built by Pope Pius II in 1461 to counter the urban strife between the Colonna and Orsini families;
- Tivoli Cathedral (Duomo, rebuilt from 1635 to 1641).

== Economy and infrastructure ==
Tivoli's quarries produce travertine, a particular white calcium-carbonate rock used in building most Roman monuments. The water power of the falls supplies some of the electricity that lights Rome. The slopes of the neighbouring hills are covered with olives, vineyards and gardens; the most important local industry is the manufacture of paper.

== Influences ==
Tivoli's reputation as a stylish resort and the fame of the gardens of the Villa d'Este have inspired the naming of other sites after Tivoli: for example, the Jardin de Tivoli, Paris (France), the Tivoli Gardens amusement park in Copenhagen (Denmark) and the Park Tivoli (Utrecht). The Wörlitz Synagogue in the Dessau-Wörlitz Garden Realm (Germany) is a replica of the Temple of Vesta at Tivoli.

== Notable people ==
- Antinous (born 111), Lover of Hadrian
- Emilio Segrè (born 1905), Italian-American physicist and Nobel laureate
- Francesco Lollobrigida (born 1972), Lawyer
- Hadrian (born 76), Roman Emperor
- Luigi Stillo (born 1984), professional footballer
- Little Tony (born 1941), Sammarinese singer
- Nicola Zalewski (born 2002), Polish footballer

== Climate ==
Tivoli has a Mediterranean climate with warm and dry summers and cool and wet winters.

Climate data for Tivoli
Month	Jan	Feb	Mar	Apr	May	Jun	Jul	Aug	Sep	Oct	Nov	Dec	Year
Mean daily maximum °C (°F)	12.3 (54.1)	13.8 (56.8)	16.0 (60.8)	19.1 (66.4)	23.6 (74.5)	27.8 (82.0)	31.6 (88.9)	31.3 (88.3)	27.6 (81.7)	22.5 (72.5)	16.9 (62.4)	13.3 (55.9)	21.3 (70.4)
Mean daily minimum °C (°F)	1.9 (35.4)	2.9 (37.2)	4.5 (40.1)	7.0 (44.6)	10.4 (50.7)	14.0 (57.2)	16.4 (61.5)	16.6 (61.9)	14.1 (57.4)	10.2 (50.4)	6.2 (43.2)	3.2 (37.8)	8.9 (48.1)
Average precipitation mm (inches)	74 (2.9)	74 (2.9)	61 (2.4)	66 (2.6)	56 (2.2)	43 (1.7)	28 (1.1)	46 (1.8)	71 (2.8)	89 (3.5)	100 (4.1)	86 (3.4)	800 (31.4)

== Sources ==
- Filippo Alessandro Sebastiani, Viaggio a Tivoli antichissima città latino-sabina fatto nel 1825, Foligno (1828).
- Dictionary of Greek and Roman Geography, William Smith, ed., Little, Brown and Company, Boston (1854).
- George Davis Chase, "The Origin of Roman Praenomina", in Harvard Studies in Classical Philology, vol. VIII, pp. 103–184 (1897).
- Rachel Wischnitzer, Architecture of the European Synagogue, Jewish Publication Society of America, Philadelphia (1964).
- Lazio Itinerari ebraici. I luoghi, la storia, l'arte, Marsilio, ed. (1997), ISBN 883176795X.
