= San Pietro alla Carità =

Churches of Tivoli

Church of San Pietro alla Carità
- Chiesa di San Pietro alla Carità
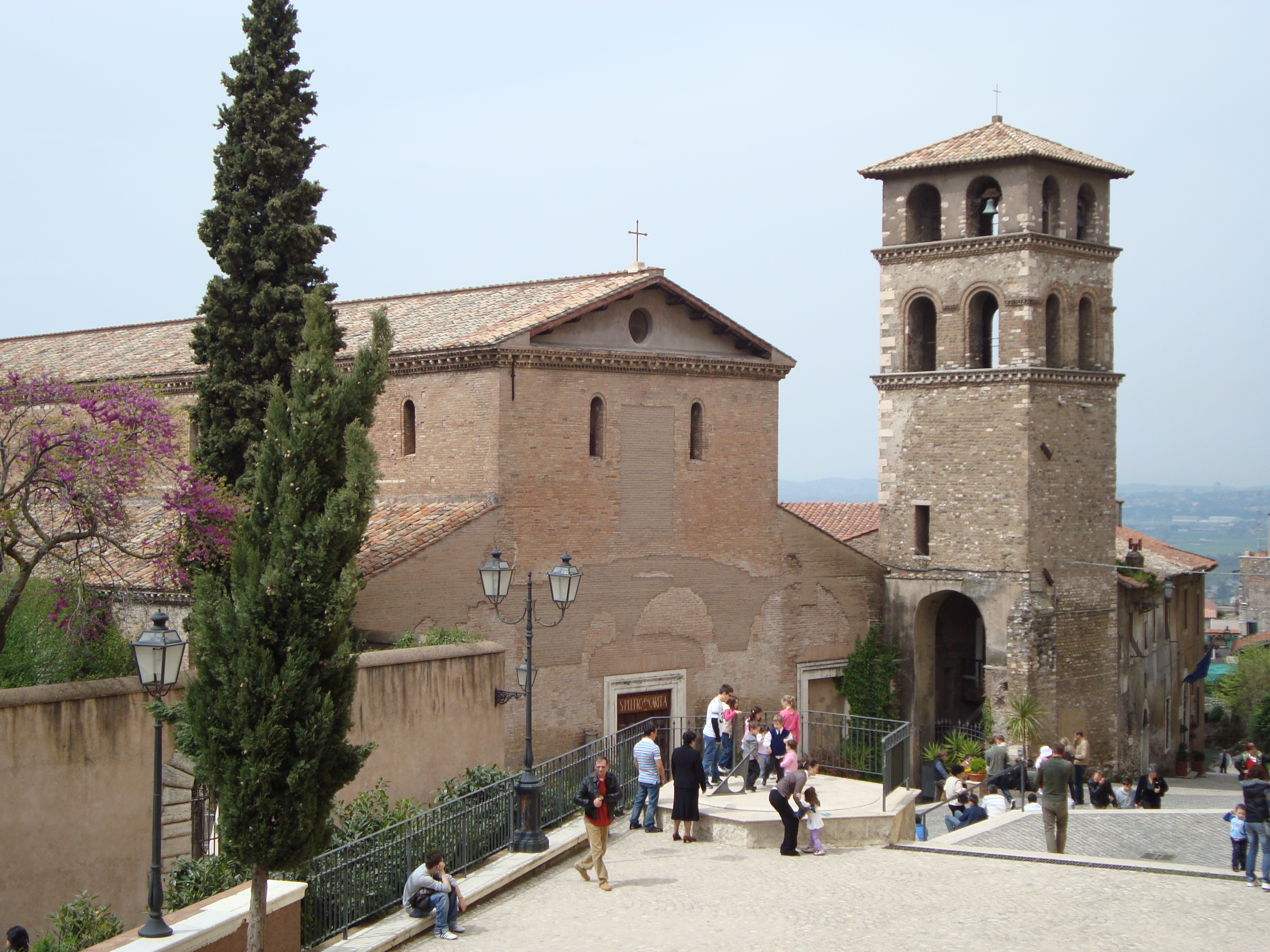
- The church of San Pietro alla Carità.

- Location in Italy
- 41°57′49″N 12°47′49″E
- Location: Via Campitelli, Tivoli
- Country: Italy
- Language: Italian
- Denomination: Catholic
- Tradition: Roman Rite

History
- Status: regional church

Architecture
- Functional status: active
- Style: Romanesque architecture
- Years built: 5th century

Administration
- Diocese: Rome

Chiesa di San Pietro alla Carità ("Church of Saint Peter to the Charity" in English) is a Romanesque architecture Catholic Church of Tivoli, Lazio. The church is one of the oldest in Tivoli and its present appearance is due to 12th-century rebuilding and restoration in 1951 following the bombing suffered during World War II. Inside is a cosmatesque floor.

== Description ==
The church has a brick façade with three doors that lead to the central part of the church building. At the top are two side windows with a center circle under the eves. A bell tower is decorated with Cornices and arched windows. The interior is characterized by a cosmatesque floor that adorns the nave, with the works art in the apse of the main altar, "Christ crucified between the Virgin and St. John the Evangelist", dating from the fourteenth century and the "Madonna Enthroned with Saints Peter and Paul", dating from the thirteenth century.

== History ==
The church was built in the 5th century at the request of Pope Simplicius, a native of Tivoli, on the ruins of an ancient Roman villa, which probably belonged to Quinto Cecilio Metello Pio Scipione Nasica.

The church named after the Saint Peter from a legend, that the Christian community was founded by the apostles that met in this building. The first mention of the church is found in the biography of Pope Leo III, in the Liber Pontificalis.

Between the 16th and 17th centuries the church underwent heavy modifications. In 1951, restoration was made after the bombing suffered during World War II when the church was returned to the city.

== In popular culture ==
In the third season of Medici (TV Series), scenes featuring Girolamo Savonarola at the convent of San Marco were shot at the church of San Pietro alla Carità in Tivoli. The facade and bell tower are seen when Savonarola preaches to the crowd of Florentines, and the interior in some scenes.

== Gallery ==
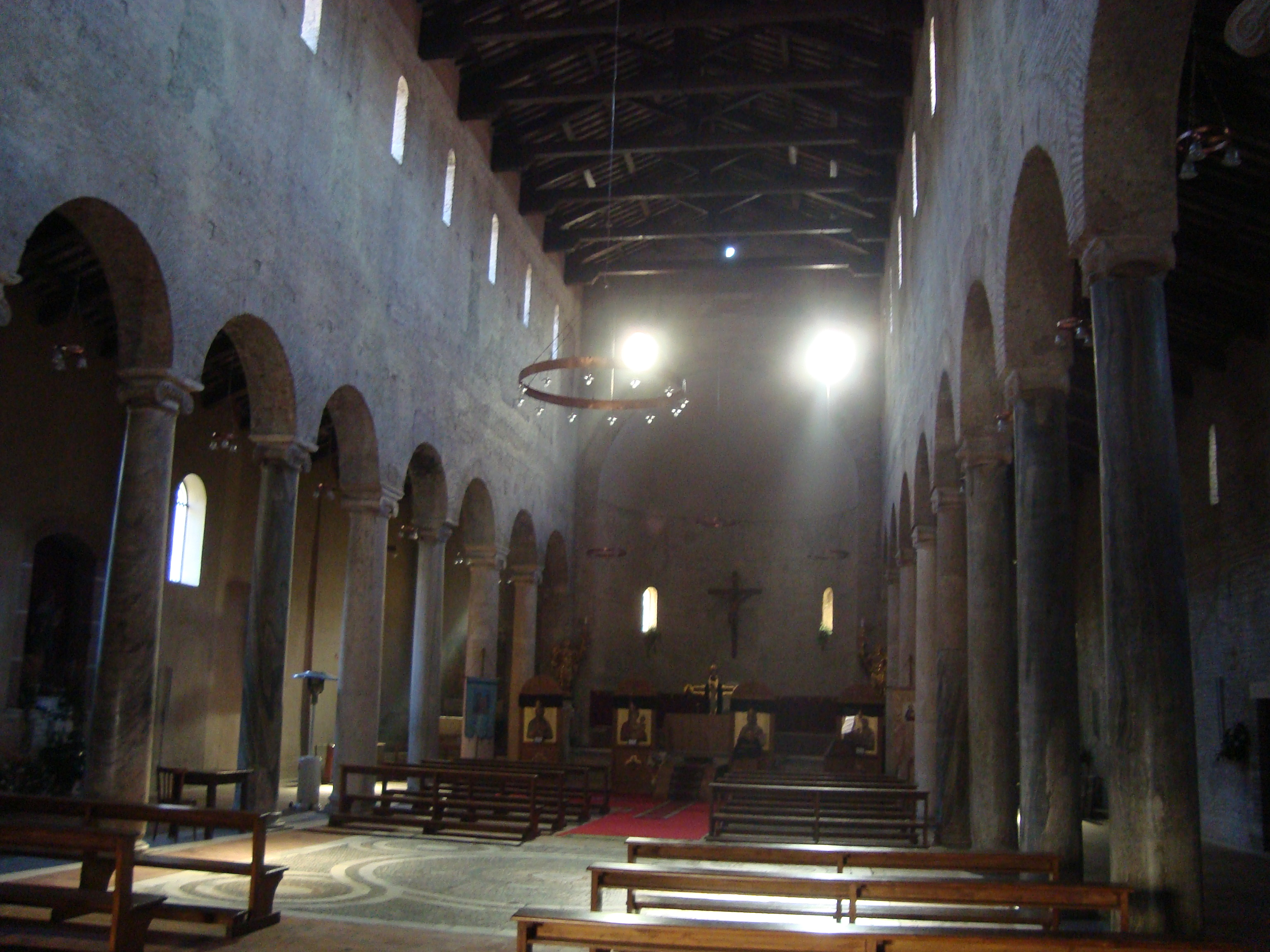
Interior view of San Pietro alla Carità

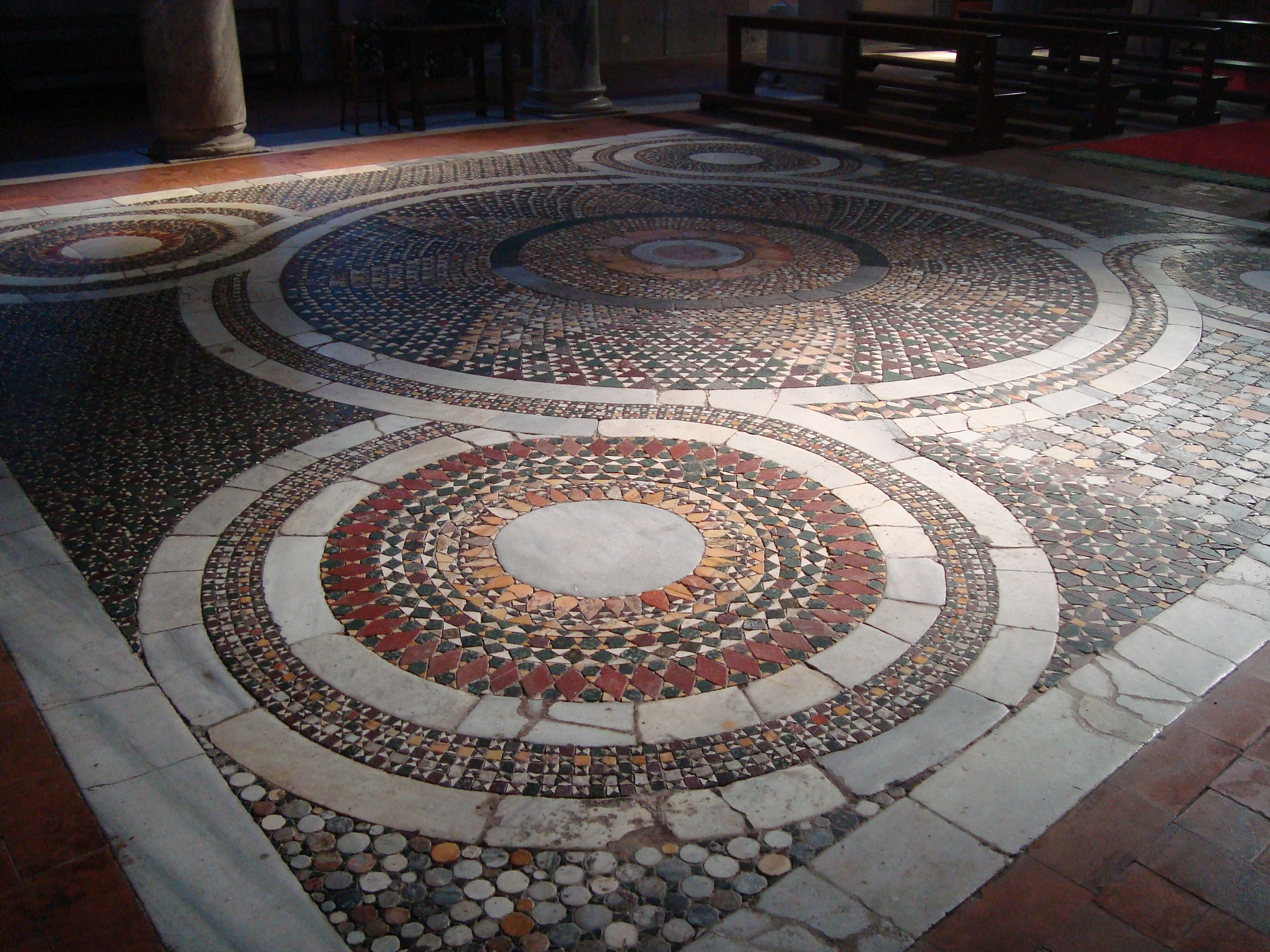
Cosmatesque-style paving of the San Pietro alla Carità

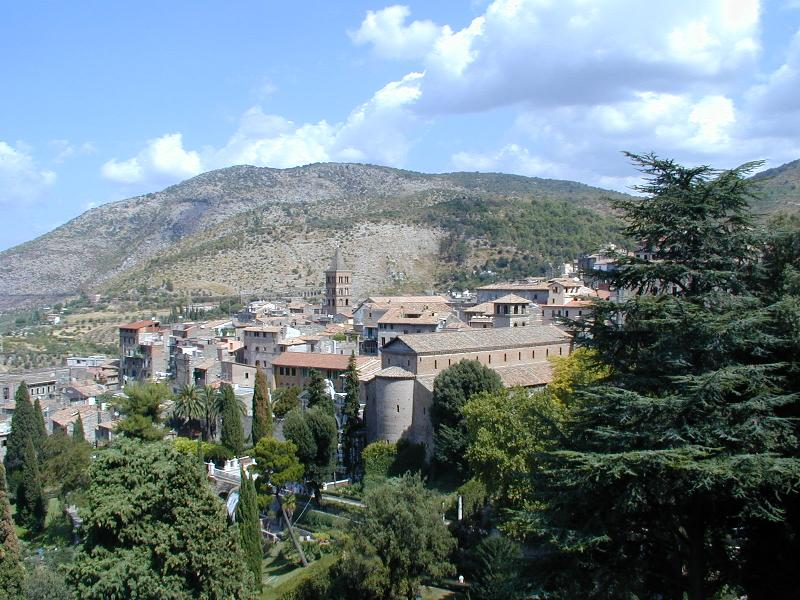
Villa d'Este: a view of the garden and the old town from the main floor

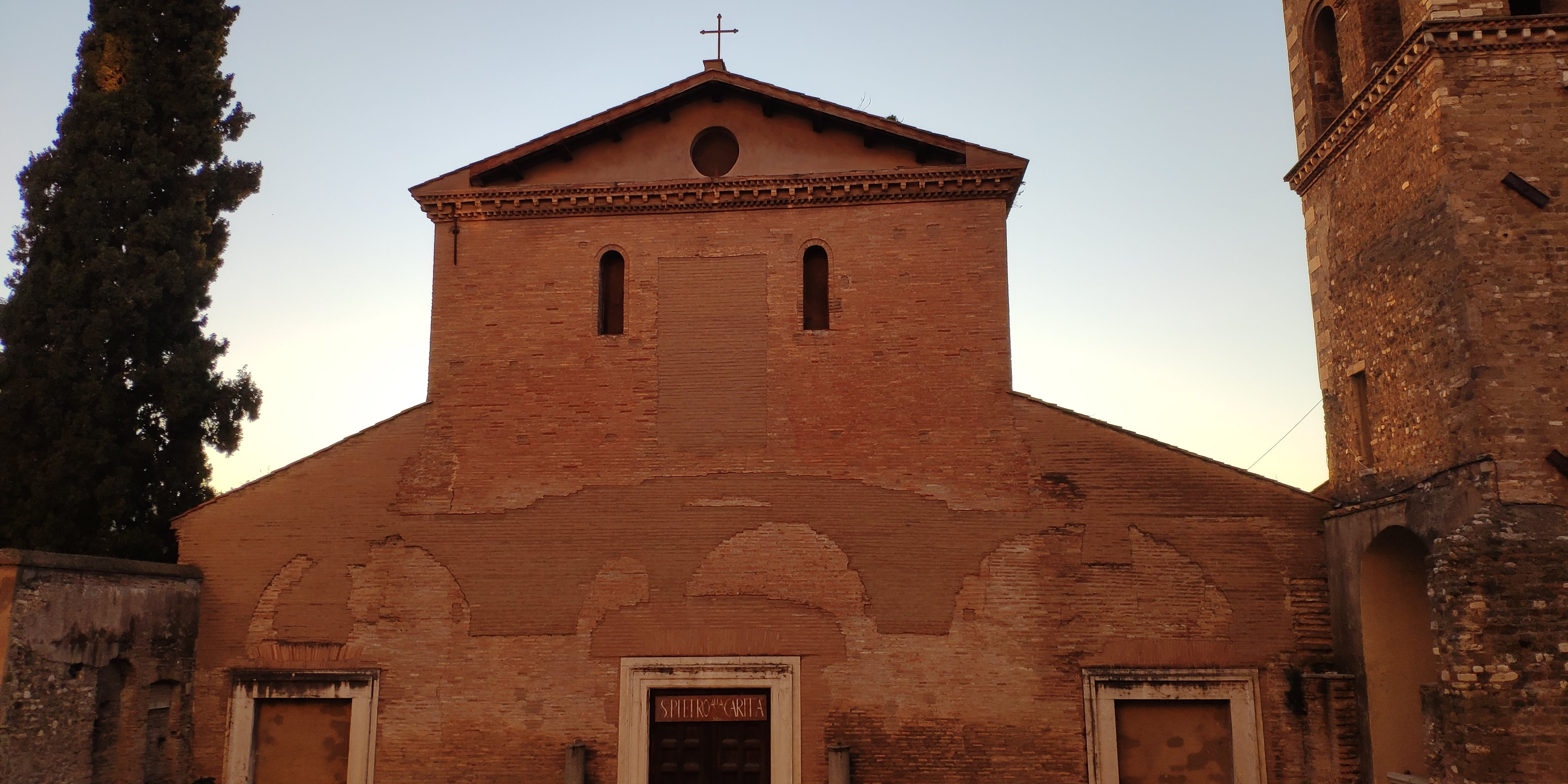
Front view of the San Pietro alla Carità
