= Pisoni =

Pisoni is a surname. Notable people with the surname include:

- Adam Pisoni, American entrepreneur
- Athos Pisoni (1937–2025), Brazilian sports shooter
- David Pisoni (born 1963), Australian politician
- Ferruccio Pisoni (1936–2020), Italian politician
- Gaetano Matteo Pisoni (1713–1782), Italian architect
- Jim Pisoni (1929–2007), American baseball player
- Pier Giacomo Pisoni (1928–1991), Italian historian, paleographer and archivist

== See also ==
- Pisoni Vineyards and Winery is a family-owned and operated vineyard and winery located in the Santa Lucia Highlands of California’s Monterey Coast
