= Villa Gregoriana =

Park in Tivoli, Italy

Coordinates: 41°57′56″N 12°48′05″E

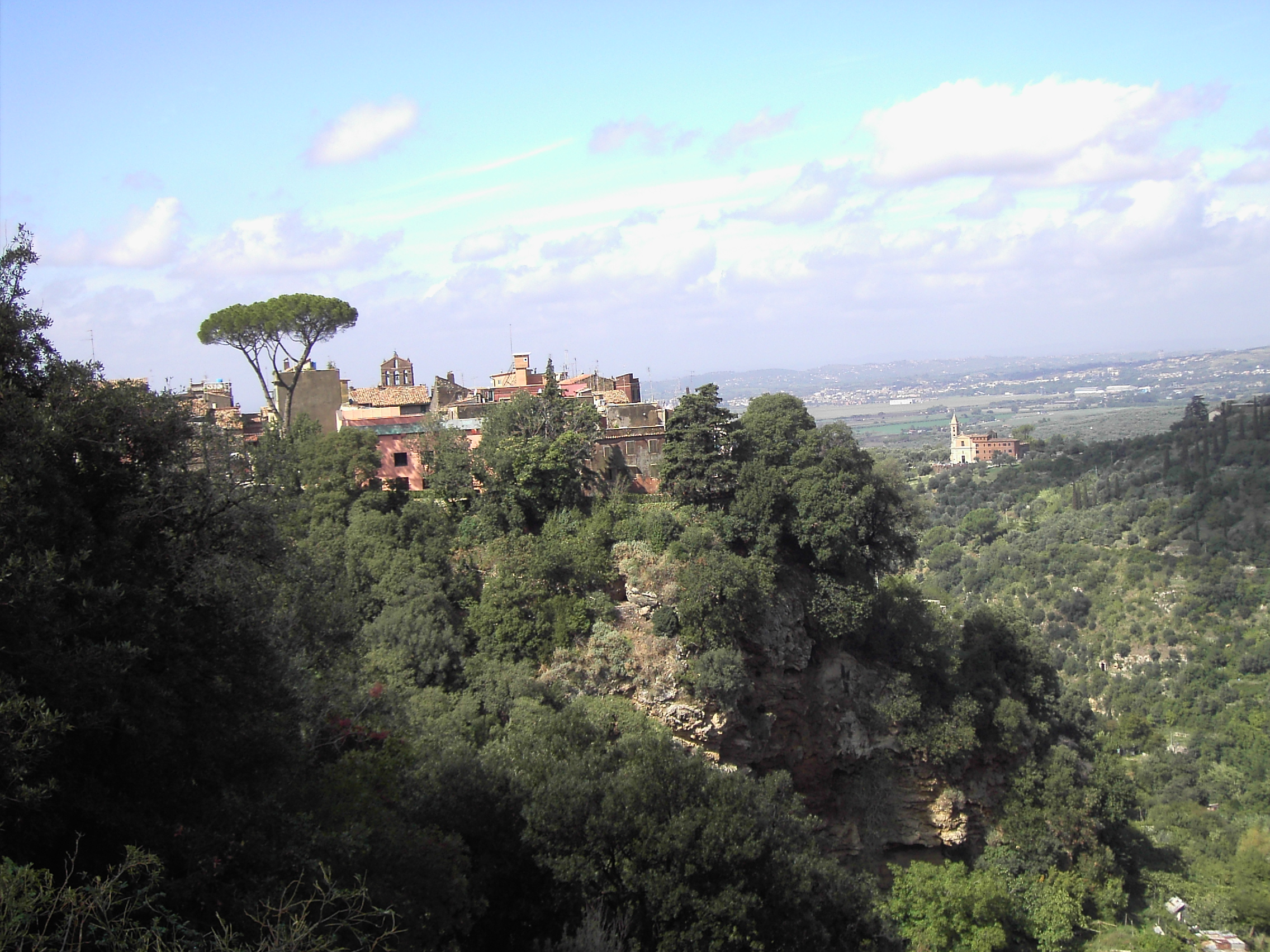
Villa Gregoriana

Villa Gregoriana is a park in Tivoli, Italy, located at the foot of the city's ancient acropolis. It consists mainly of thick woodland with paths that lead to the small circular Roman Temple of Vesta, the caves of Neptune and the Sirens, which form part of a series of gorges and cascades, and to the Great Waterfall.

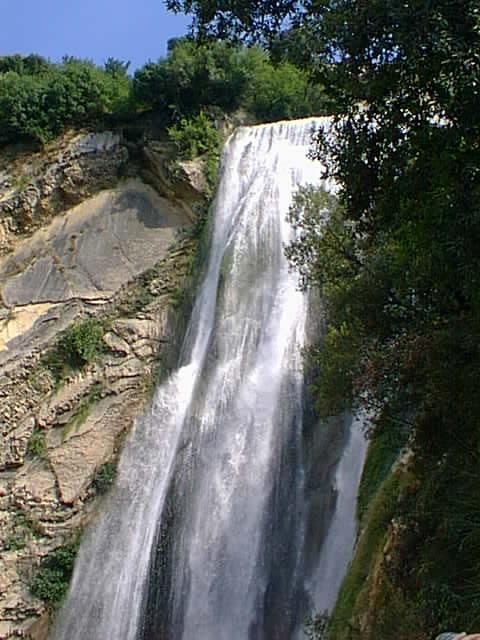
The villa's grand waterfall

The park was commissioned by Pope Gregory XVI in 1835 to rebuild the bed of the Aniene River, which had been damaged by the flood of 1826. The Aniene River Valley and Villa Gregoriana were submitted in 2006 for consideration as a UNESCO World Heritage Site.

== History ==
Since ancient times, the river formed a wide curve around the acropolis, after which it fell from a limestone spur onto the plain below. The river formed originally four falls, now reduced to two. The site had a strategical importance since it commanded the transumanza path from Abruzzo along the path which later become the Via Valeria. The Romans built hydraulic artifacts there, 12 of which are known by findings today.

It had fallen into ruin by the end of the 20th century, but was reopened to the public in 2005 thanks to a major landscape recovery project orchestrated by Fondo Ambiente Italiano (FAI), the National Trust of Italy.

== Sources ==
- Giuliani, Cairoli Fulvio (2005). La Villa Gregoriana a Tivoli. Tiburis Artistica.
