= History of the Jews in Tivoli =

The first traces of Jewish presence in the city Tivoli dates back to 1305. The main activity of the Jews of the town was the medical. Among the prominent personalities it's remembered the doctor Elijah di Sabato and Solomone the physician.

"During the pontificate of Urban VI, there was in Tivoli a synagogue of the Jews, who lived in a corner of the city, close to the Convento de' Dominicans. In that age their number increased, and they had become restless and boldly . The Mucipale speculating that this could disturb public order, with a resolution of July 3, 1389, decided on the way to contain their pride, that they should carry a red cape over the shoulders to stand out from the other citizens, under penalty of life and confiscation of goods in case of infringement.".

In the fifteenth century the cultural level of the community had reached a high level, as tracked by the number of codices that were stored in major libraries. Tivoli was the site of a meeting of representatives from the Italian Jewish communities to discuss the anti-Jewish laws enacted by the Council of Basel (1431-1449).

The Jewish cemetery was located in the resort community of Magnano, three kilometers downstream from the city center along the Via Tiburtina. In a later period the archives indicate the cemetery at Rocca Pia's castle. According to the sources the synagogue was located in the area between the existing street of Via Palatine and the Vicolo dei Granai, the latter known as " alley of the Jews." The building, built over the centuries in various buildings, was finally destroyed in 1937 to expand via Palatina. The Jewish ghetto was surrounded by a two-door under the arch of the medieval portico, at the beginning of the alley that brings to Piazza Palatina, and the other at the end of the Vicolo dei Granai that ends in Via Palatina.

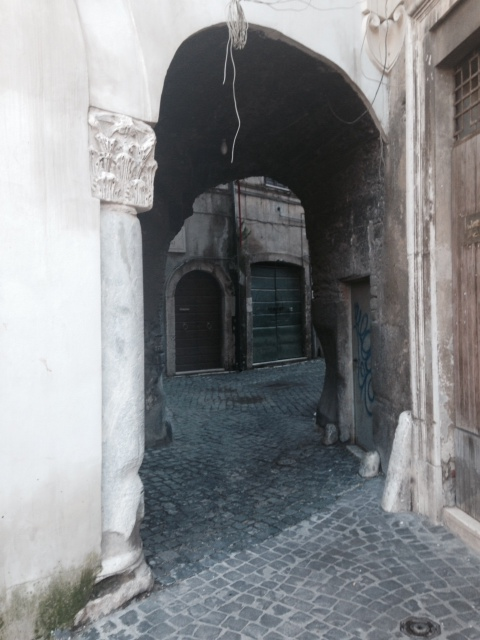
Vicolo dei Granai that ends in Piazza Palatina, ancient door of the Ghetto.

"According to the most ancient sources, the Ventura family departed from Tivoli along with other Jews expelled from the town by Pope Pius V in 1568".

In the church of San Silvestro there is a twelfth-century fresco depicting a group of Jews involved in a dispute, which took place in 315, with the Bishop Sylvester.
