= Stello =

Stello is a surname and may refer to:

- Lillian Stello alias Chesty Morgan (born 1937), Polish-born exotic dancer and actress
- Dick Stello (1934–1987), American professional baseball umpire

== Other uses ==
- Stello (fr) (Les Consultations du Docteur-Noir. Première consultation : Stello ou les Diables bleus), 1832), novel by Alfred de Vigny
