= Temple of Vesta, Tivoli =

Ancient Roman temple in Tivoli, Italy

- Tempio di Vesta (Italian)
- The circular tholos structure of the Temple of Vesta perched over the Aniene valley

- Shown within the environs of Rome (Tivoli)
- Interactive map of Temple of Vesta, Tivoli
- 41°58′00″N 12°48′03″E
- Location: Tivoli, Rome, Italy

History
- Built: Early 1st century BCE
- Built by: Lucius Gellius (Builder or restorer)

Site notes
- Area: Acropolis of ancient Tibur (Villa Gregoriana)

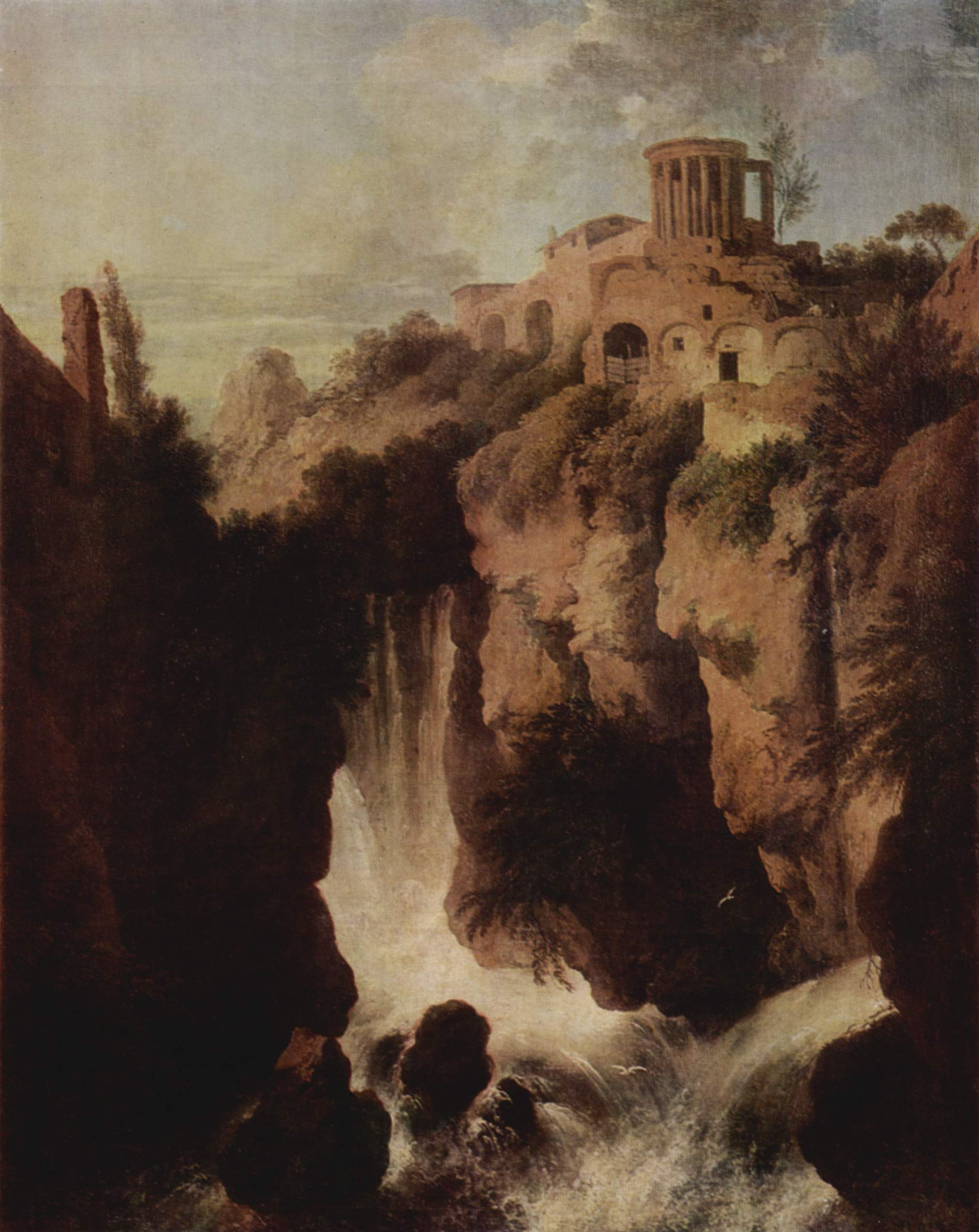
Falls of the Aniene by Christian Wilhelm Ernst Dietrich, c. 1745-50: a romanticized view

The so-called Temple of Vesta is a small circular Roman temple (so a tholos) in Tivoli, Italy, dating to the early 1st century BC. Its ruins are dramatically sited on the acropolis of the Etruscan and Roman city, overlooking the falls of the Aniene and a picturesque narrow gully.

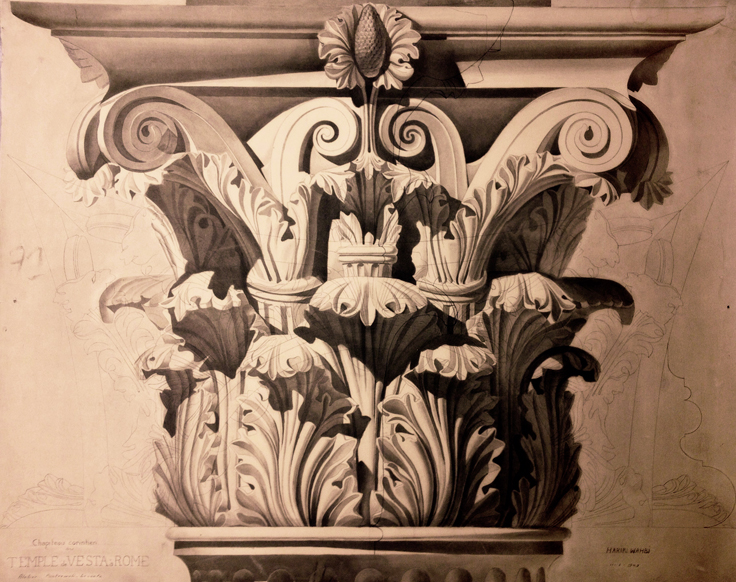
Drawing of a 19th-century "Tivoli order" capital, reconstructing those of the temple

The temple's capitals have been much admired and imitated and their variation of the Corinthian order sometimes called the "Tivoli order". They have two rows of acanthus leaves, and its abacus is decorated with oversize fleurons in the form of hibiscus flowers (probably intended to be Hibiscus syriacus) with pronounced spiral pistils. The column flutes have flat tops. The frieze exhibits fruit swags suspended between bucrania. Above each swag is a rosette. The cornice does not have modillions.

The site now forms part of the Villa Gregoriana park.

== History ==
It is not known for certain to whom the temple was dedicated, whether to Hercules, the protecting god of Tibur, or to Albunea, the Tiburtine Sibyl, or to Tiburnus, the eponymous hero of the city, or to Gellia Gens as mausoleum (their villa was up there), or to Vesta herself, whose more familiar circular peripteral Temple of Vesta is to be seen in the Roman Forum. A rectangular temple stands nearby, equally difficult to attribute, often called the Temple of the Sibyl.

The name of the builder or restorer of the Temple of Vesta is Lucius Gellius, memorialized in the inscription on the architrave. The peripteral temple in a variant of the Corinthian order surrounds its circular cella, which is raised on a high brick podium clad in blocks of travertine: the cella has a door and two windows. The ambulacrum that surrounds the cella had eighteen Corinthian columns (ten remain standing).

The comparatively good condition of the temple is owing to its Christianization as a church, "Santa Maria della Rotonda". The Christian accretions had already disappeared in the 16th century.

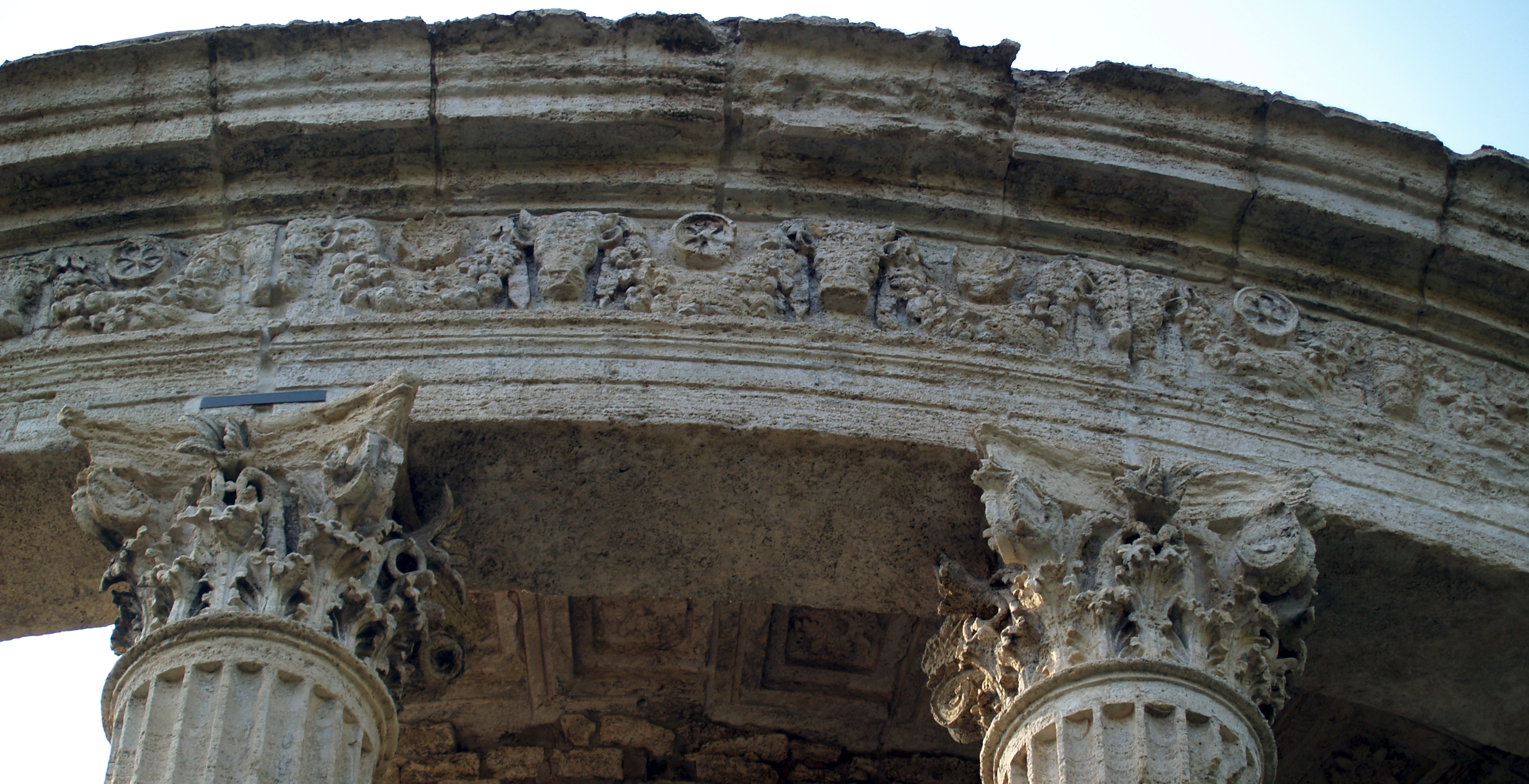
The rich order was admired and often copied

Careful measured drawings of the 'Temple of Vesta" were published by Antoine Desgodetz (1682) who gave elevation and plan as well as carefully rendered details of the carved capitals and the frieze. in the following century both Giuseppe Vasi and Giovanni Battista Piranesi made etchings and engravings of the "Temple of Vesta".

== Imitations ==
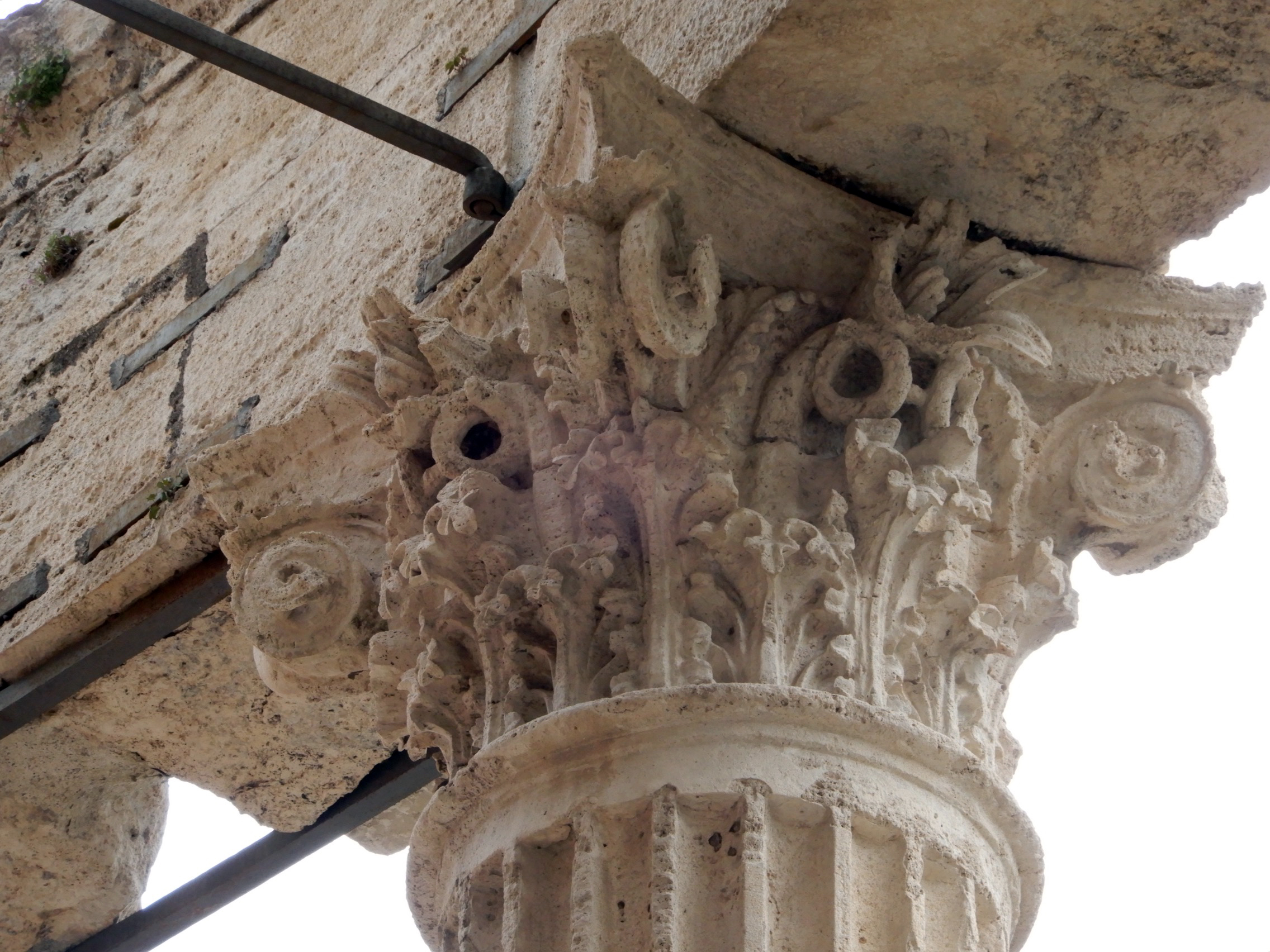
One of the capitals

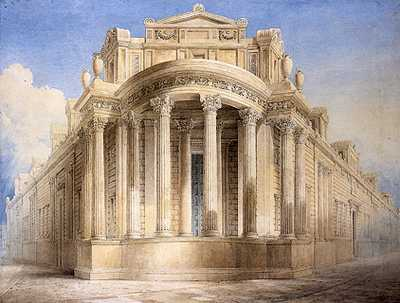
Soane's 1805 design for the Bank of England, painted by Joseph Gandy

The "Temple of Vesta" has provided a model for numerous structures. These range from orthodox replicas in landscaped gardens to variants using only some aspects of its detailing.

Perhaps the earliest example in England is the Temple of Venus at Garendon Hall, Leicestershire which dates from the 1730s. The English architect Sir John Soane visited the temple and made drawings which he used as comparative examples in his lectures. His 1805 design for a corner of the Bank of England in London became known as 'Tivoli Corner'. Other examples in England include General Pitt River's 1890 Temple of Vesta at Rushmore House (now Sandroyd School) in Wiltshire; William Kent's "Temple of Ancient Virtue" at Stowe; and Sir William Chambers' "Temple of Solitude" at Kew.

In Northern Ireland, the Mussenden Temple at Downhill was built by Frederick Hervey, 4th Earl of Bristol and Bishop of Derry, in the style of the temple. In 1777, he attempted to buy the Temple of Vesta and bring it back to Downhill, but Pope Pius VI would not accede to the proposal.

In France, the temple inspired Richard Mique's Temple de l'Amour in his jardin anglo-chinois at the Petit Trianon and Gabriel Davioud's "Temple de Sibylle" in the Parc des Buttes Chaumont.

In Poland, the Temple of the Sibyl in Puławy was erected by Izabela Czartoryska to designs by the Polish architect Chrystian Piotr Aigner and served as a museum.

In northern California, a version of the temple was set as a landscape feature in the English tradition. The "Sunol Water Temple" was designed in 1910 by California architect Willis Polk for the Spring Valley Water Company to mark the spot in California's Sunol Valley where the waters came together to supply San Francisco.

== See also ==
- List of Ancient Roman temples
