= Pisoni Vineyards and Winery =

Vineyard and winery located in California

Pisoni Vineyards
- Location: Gonzales, CA, United States
- Appellation: Santa Lucia Highlands, California
- Other labels: Lucia, Lucy
- Founded: 1982
- First vintage: 1998 Pinot Noir
- Key people: Gary Pisoni (Founder); Jeff Pisoni (Head Winemaker); Mark Pisoni (Vineyard Manager)
- Known for: Pisoni Estate Pinot Noir
- Varietals: Pinot Noir, Chardonnay, Syrah
- Other products: Iceberg Lettuce, Romaine Lettuce, Broccoli, Cauliflower
- Tasting: For mailing list members only, by reservation
- Website: www.pisonivineyards.com

Pisoni Estate is a family-owned and operated vineyard and winery located in the Santa Lucia Highlands of California’s Monterey Coast. It was founded in 1982 by Gary Pisoni, who was more interested in growing wine grapes than row crops for the family vegetable farm. He decided to plant a vineyard in the mountains above the Salinas Valley--an area previously considered undesirable for growing because of its dry, granitic soil. The vineyard began with small crops of Chardonnay, Cabernet Sauvignon, and Pinot Noir, then eventually focused on the Pinot Noir for which it has become renowned.

In the vineyard’s first decade, Gary built its reputation by selling fruit to other vintners. In 1998, the Pisoni family also began to produce a single wine: Pisoni Estate Pinot Noir, which remains the sole wine made under this label.

Pisoni Estate now covers 40 acres of the Santa Lucia Highlands AVA, and consists of 30 individually farmed blocks ranging from .5 to 17 acres in size. Pisoni Estate wines were named among America’s Grand Crus by wine critic Robert Parker.

== History ==
In 1952, Eddie and Jane Pisoni launched their produce business, Pisoni Farms, on the Breschini Ranch, owned by Jane’s family in Gonzales, California. They turned the former dairy and alfalfa farm into a row crop operation, growing lettuce, sugar beets, tomatoes, onions, beans, broccoli, asparagus, and cauliflower for market. Eddie Pisoni farmed the land with the help of Jane’s brother, Elvezio “Saw” Breschini, while Jane Pisoni did the accounting.

The Pisonis expanded their property in 1979 with the purchase of a 280-acre parcel of land in the Santa Lucia Mountains. They used this acreage for livestock grazing, as its dry, rocky slopes were considered inhospitable for crops.

In 1982, however, Jane and Eddie's son, Gary Pisoni, decided to plant a few acres of the mountain parcel to wine grapes. Gary had developed a love of wine in college, and saw an opportunity to diversify his family's business while pursuing his dream of becoming a winemaker. He believed that the rocky soil and fog-cooled climate of the Santa Lucia Highlands were similar to Burgundy, and was determined to be successful there despite his family's skepticism.

Initial attempts to locate a water source on the property were unsuccessful, so for the first nine years, Pisoni drove water tankers from the valley floor to irrigate the vineyard. Meanwhile, he used witchers and drilled several wells on the property before finally striking water—beneath 8 feet of soil and 490 feet of solid granite—on his 6th attempt in 1991.

Gary Pisoni sent the wine he made from his mountain fruit to local vintners for sampling, many of whom asked to purchase his grapes. His reputation as a premium grapegrower—one of the first in the Santa Lucia Highlands AVA—spread throughout the state. According to wine critic MaryAnn Worobiek, "the success of Pinot Noir in the Santa Lucia Highlands is largely due to Gary Pisoni."

In 1998, the Pisoni family launched its flagship label, Pisoni Estate. Today, Gary's sons Mark and Jeff direct the viticulture and winemaking operations. Mark Pisoni manages the vineyards, while his brother Jeff makes Pisoni Estate wines. A select group of California winemakers continue to source fruit from Pisoni Vineyards.

== Vineyards ==
The Santa Lucia Highlands AVA is a 12-mile long, terraced region above the Salinas River near Monterey Bay in California's Central Coast. The region is notable for its long ripening season; the result of morning sun cooled by afternoon fog and breezes from the North Pacific, slowing photosynthesis and allowing harvests often six weeks later than in other California growing regions. The soil is highly granitic and well-drained because of its elevation—anywhere from 40 to 1300 feet above the valley floor.

Pisoni Vineyards, the family's estate property, is located at 1300 feet above sea level near the northeastern corner of the Santa Lucia Highlands AVA, affording it southeast exposure and regular sun. There, Pisoni Estate creates the single, vineyard-designated wine for which it is known Pisoni Estate Pinot Noir. Additionally, Pisoni Vineyards continues to sell grapes to Peter Michael, Patz & Hall, Siduri, Testarossa and several other producers.

The Pisoni family also partners with local grower Gary Franscioni to farm the Garys’ Vineyard (named for the two Garys) and the nearby Soberanes Vineyard. These two vineyards are planted primarily to Pinot Noir, with a few acres of Chardonnay and Syrah. Grapes from these vineyards are used to produce wine for Pisoni Estate's sister labels, Lucia and Lucy. Fruit from these vineyards is also purchased by several wineries.

Vineyard Manager Mark Pisoni studied agricultural economics and the University of California at Davis, and received a master's degree in farm business management from Cornell University. Mark uses sustainable farming practices in each of the three vineyards and on the family's 500-acre vegetable farm, which produces lettuces, broccoli, and cauliflower.

== Winemaking ==
Jeff Pisoni is Head Winemaker for Pisoni Estate, Lucia and Lucy. He earned his enology degree at California State University, Fresno, and worked at Peter Michael and Bernardus before returning to lead winemaking for the family business.

Jeff creates his wine using artisanal methods and small lots. Grapes are hand harvested and hand sorted. Fruit from each individually farmed vineyard block is crushed separately. The resulting small-lot wines are fermented on native yeasts whenever possible and aged independently in barrel. Finished wine is bottled unfiltered and unfined.

Pisoni Estate's sister label, Lucia, produces vineyard-designated Pinot Noir, Chardonnay, and Syrah wines from Soberanes Vineyard and Garys’ Vineyard, as well as appellation blends sourced from all three vineyards. Lucia's first release was a 2000 vintage Pinot Noir from Garys’ Vineyard.

Since 2003, the Pisonis have produced a limited amount of Santa Lucia Highlands Rosé each year under a second sister-label, Lucy. A percentage of the proceeds from the sale of Lucy wine is donated to the fight against breast cancer.
