= Luigi Stillo =

Italian footballer

Personal information
- Date of birth: January 6, 1984 (age 42)
- Place of birth: Tivoli, Italy
- Height: 1.78 m (5 ft 10 in)
- Position: Midfielder

Youth career
- 2003: Roma

Senior career*
Years	Team	Apps	(Gls)
2004–2005	Roma	0	(0)
2005	Reggiana	1	(0)
2005–2007	Giulianova	27	(0)
2007–2008	Sambenedettese	3	(0)

International career
2003	Italy U-20	1	(0)
- * Club domestic league appearances and goals

Luigi Stillo (born January 6, 1984, in Tivoli) is an Italian professional football player. He is currently unattached.

He played for several Serie C1 teams and for the Italian national under-20 team.

He lives in Rome.
