= Three Saints Church (Shaki) =

Church building in Shaki, Azerbaijan

- Azerbaijani: Üçmüqəddəs kilsəsi Russian: Нухинская трехсвятительская церковь
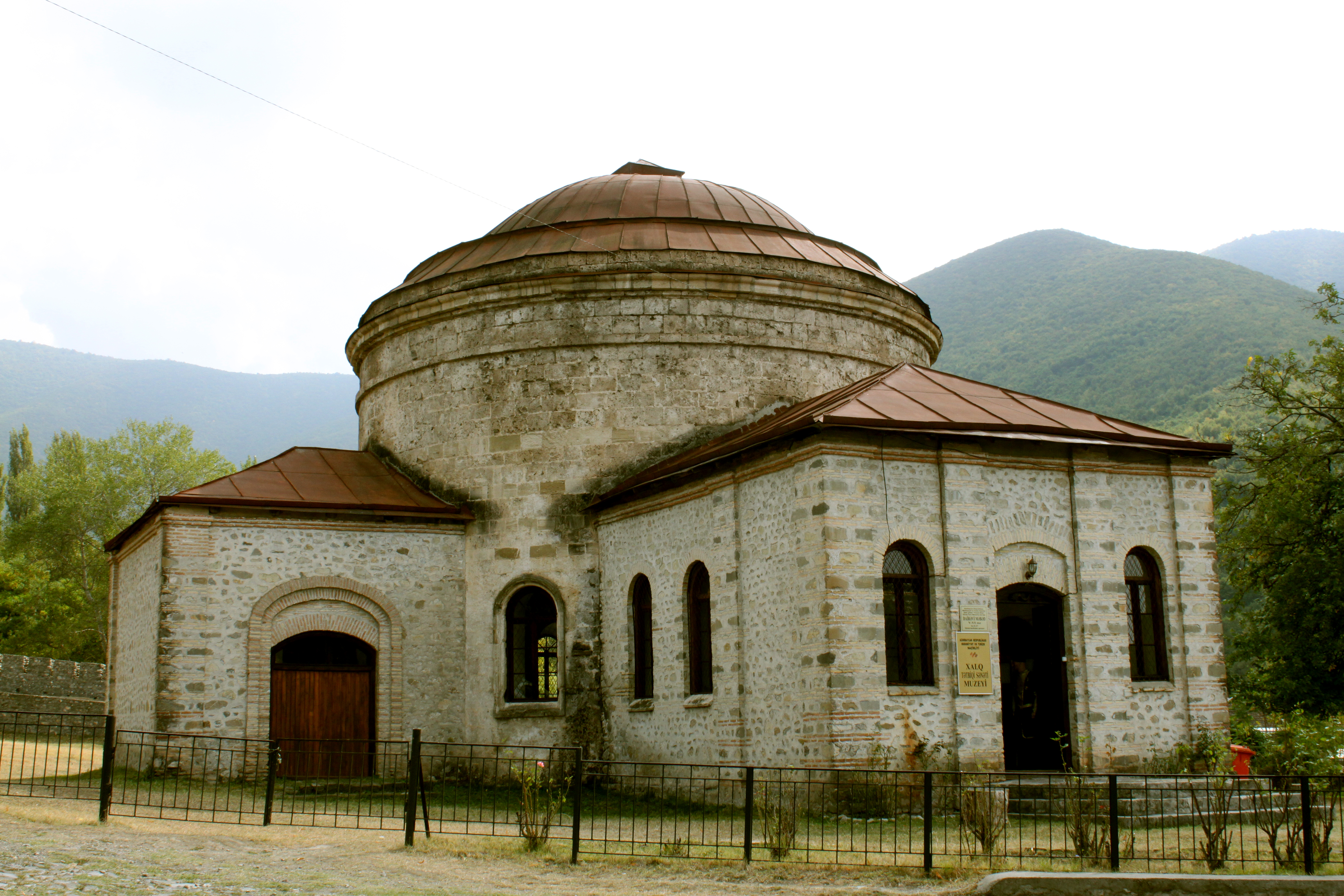

- Location within Azerbaijan

Religion
- Affiliation: Russian Orthodox Church (formerly)

Location
- Location: Shaki, Azerbaijan
- Interactive map of Three Saints Church
- Coordinates: 41.204444°N 47.198333°E

Architecture
- Completed: 19th century

Nukha Three Saints Church (Azerbaijani: Üçmüqəddəs kilsəsi; Russian: Нухинская трехсвятительская церковь, romanized: Nukhinskaya trekhsvyatitel'skaya tserkov'), Nukha Holy Church (Russian: Нухинская Святительская церковь, romanized: Nukhinskaya Svyatitel'skaya tserkov') or Round Temple (Azerbaijani: Dairəvi məbəd) is a former Russian Orthodox church building located in Shaki, Azerbaijan near Khan's Palace, named after the Cappadocian Fathers.

== History ==
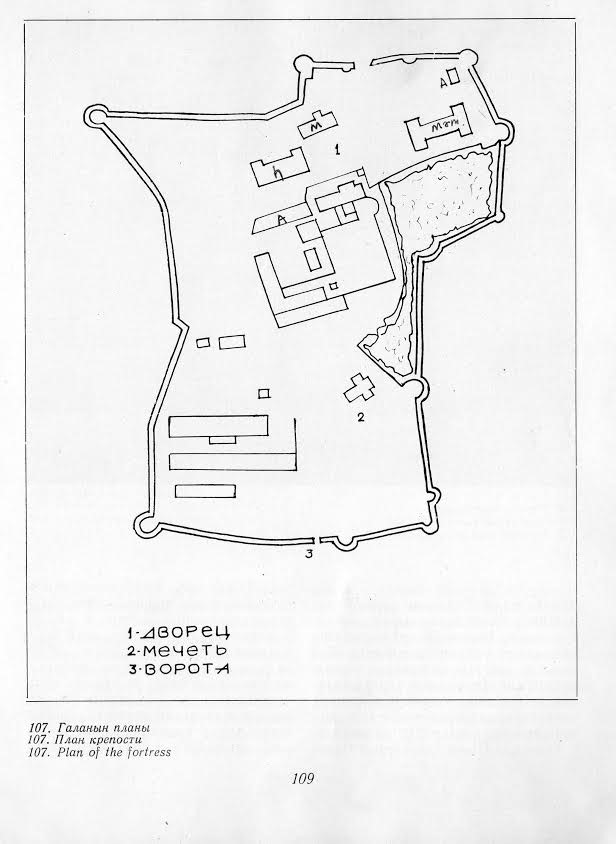
Three Saints Church marked as "mosque" in Russian, in a 1853 drawn plan of Shaki castle

The history of the church's foundation is ambiguous, which has led some researchers to identify the building as a Caucasian Albanian church, a former mosque and a chapel for the Imperial Russian garrison. The church's presence was not mentioned prior to 1853, when a priest known as Yevstafiy was appointed to serve in the church. Another priest, Gavriil Pechenskiy, served in Nukha c. 1894–1896. Georgian priest David Utiyev, a missionary to the local Muslim Ingiloy population of Tasmalı in 1875 was also based in the Three Saints Church. His grave is inside the yard of church.

=== Former mosque claim ===
A claim of the church being converted from a mosque was mentioned by the Russian traveller Joseph Segal in 1902 and Azerbaijani writer Rashid beg Afandizadeh in 1925. However, according to a report by a Russian officer stationed in the city, it was the khan's home-mosque converted to chapel.

== Graveyard ==
The church graveyard houses at least three tombstones belonging to Imperial Russian officers and David Utiyev, a Georgian priest.

== Current use ==
The church is currently functioning as the local Museum of Folk and Applied Arts. It is listed as country-level important monument in the Ministry of Culture database.

== Gallery ==
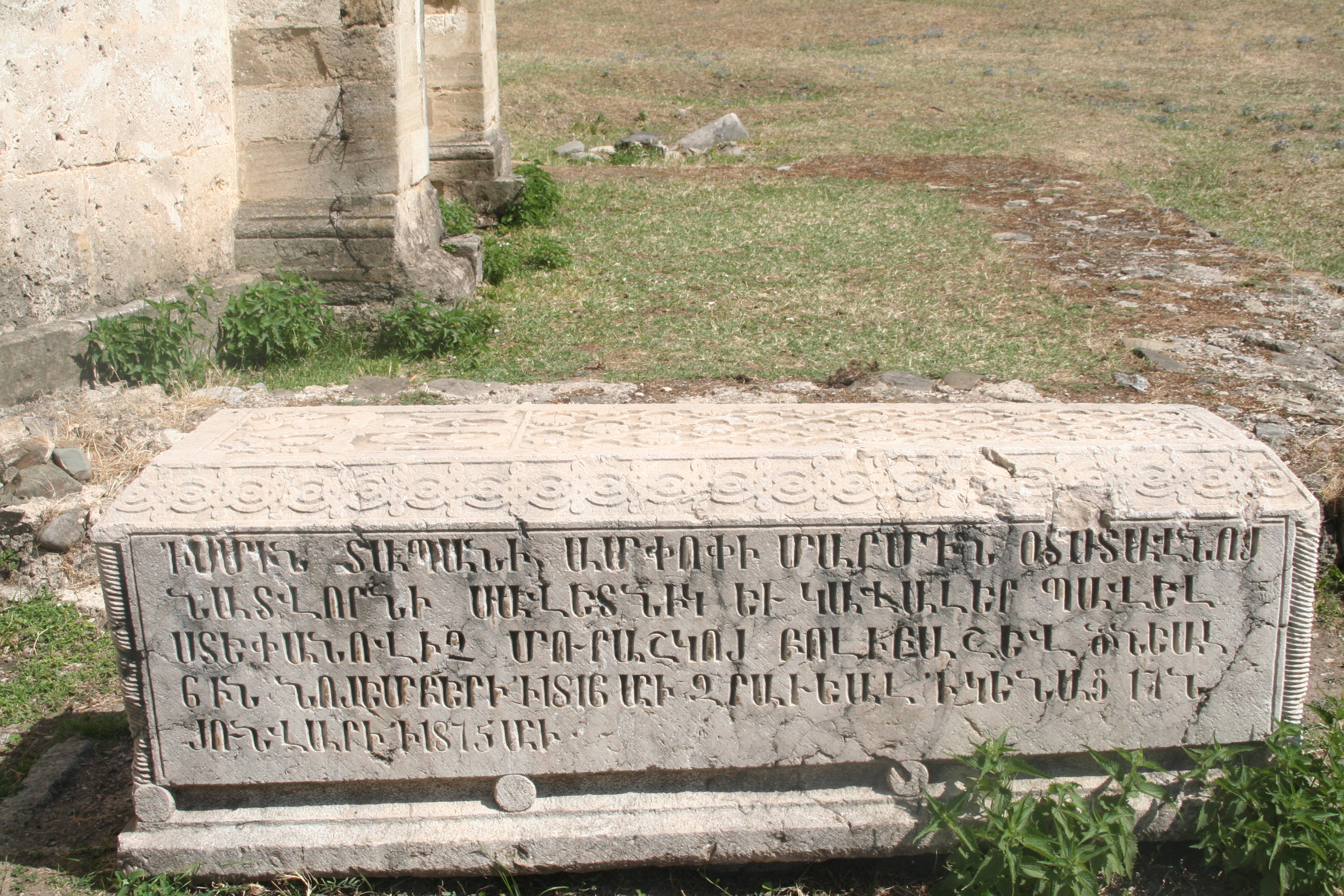
Grave with Armenian inscriptions

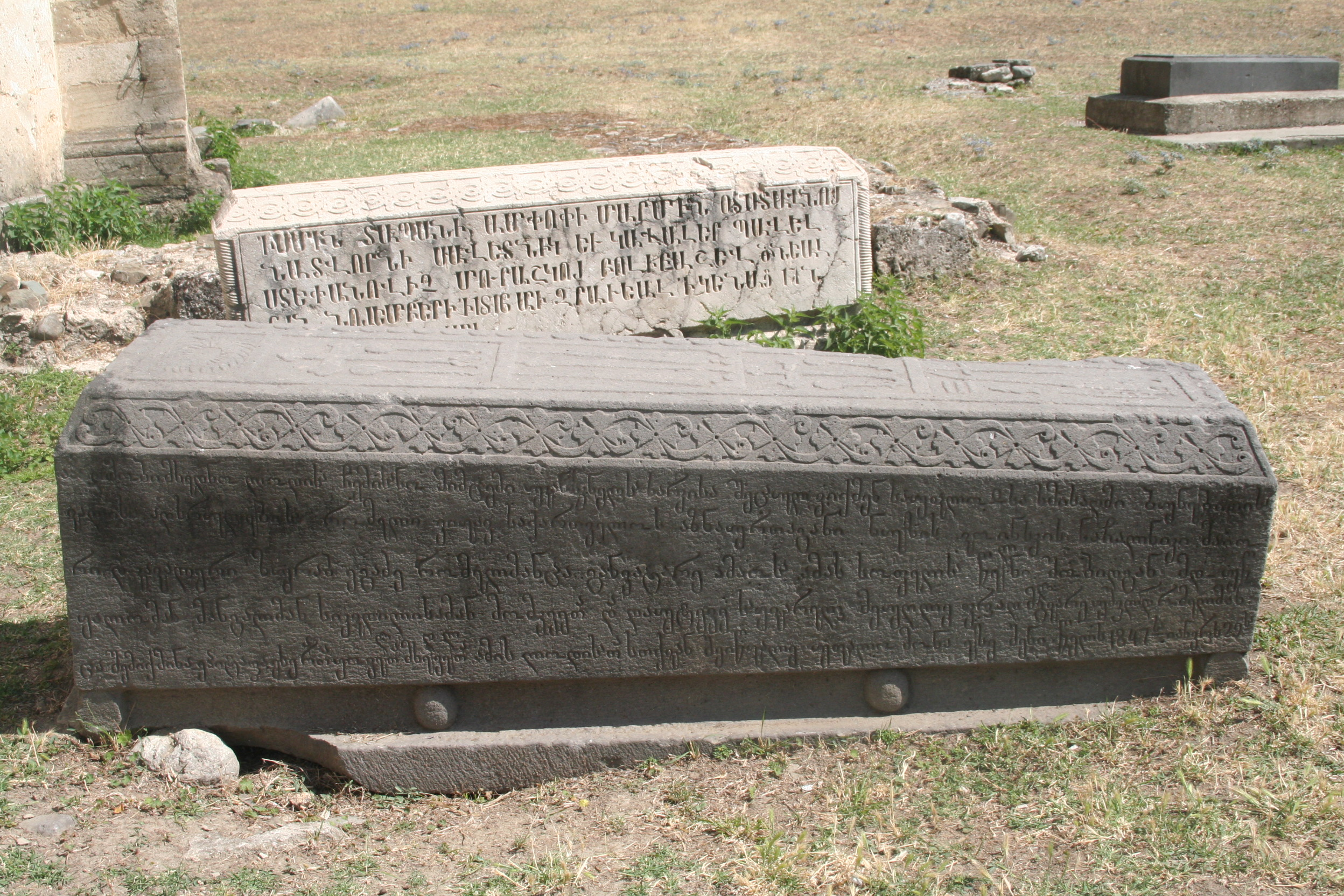
Grave with Georgian inscriptions

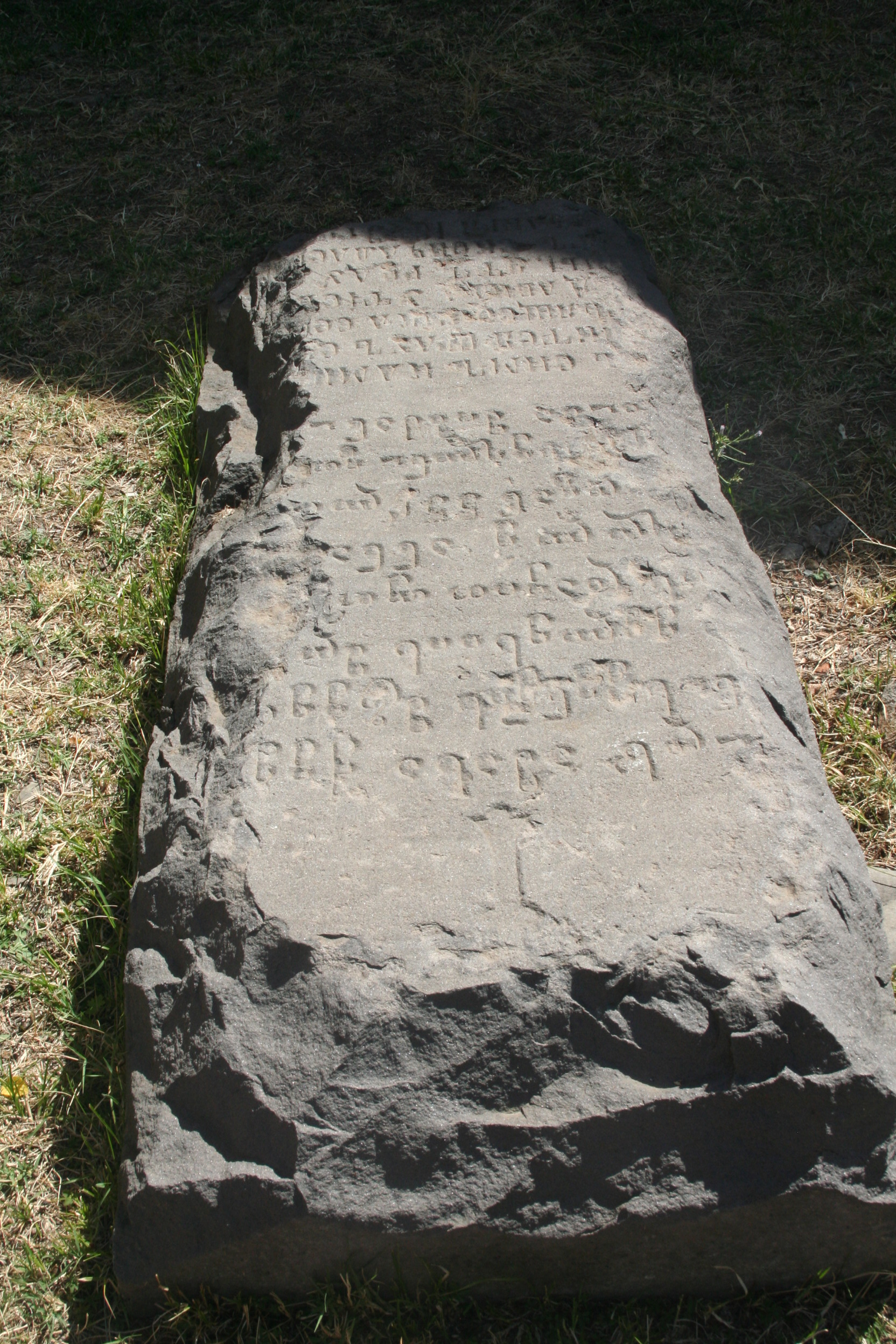
Tombstone of David Utiyev

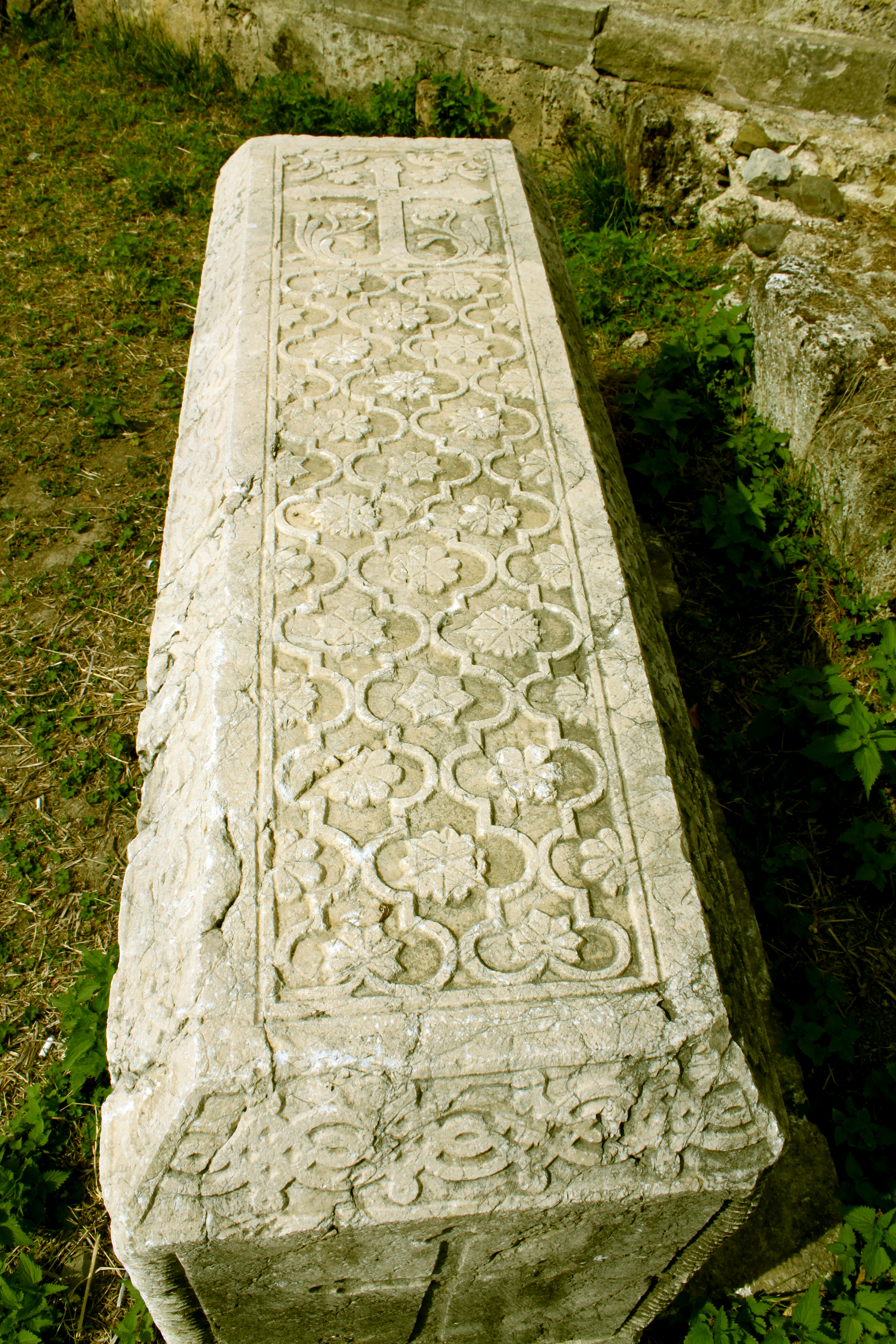
Grave decoration
