= Sovetsky, Baku =

Sovetsky Sovetski
- Historic district
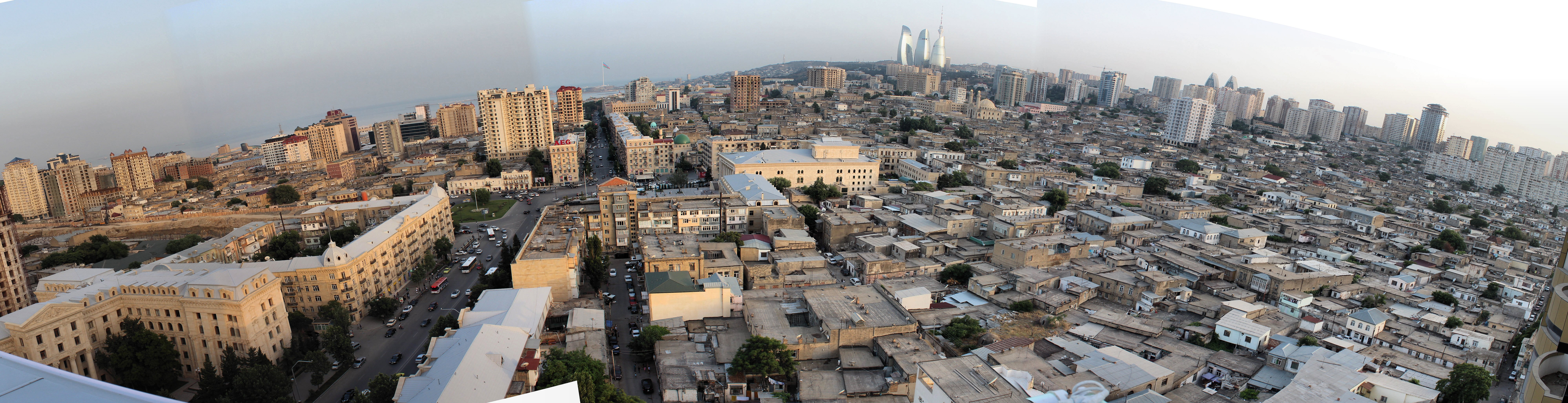
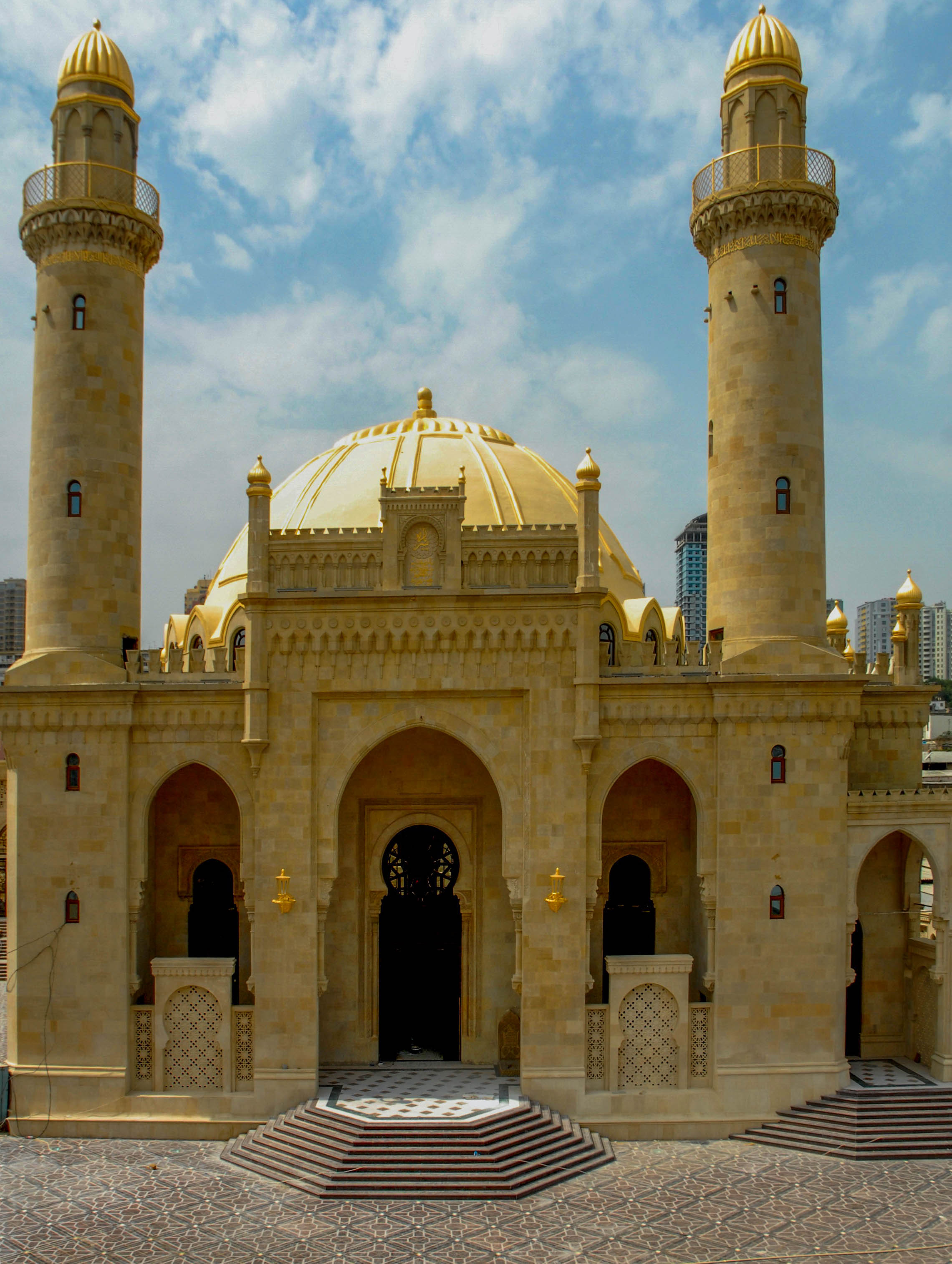
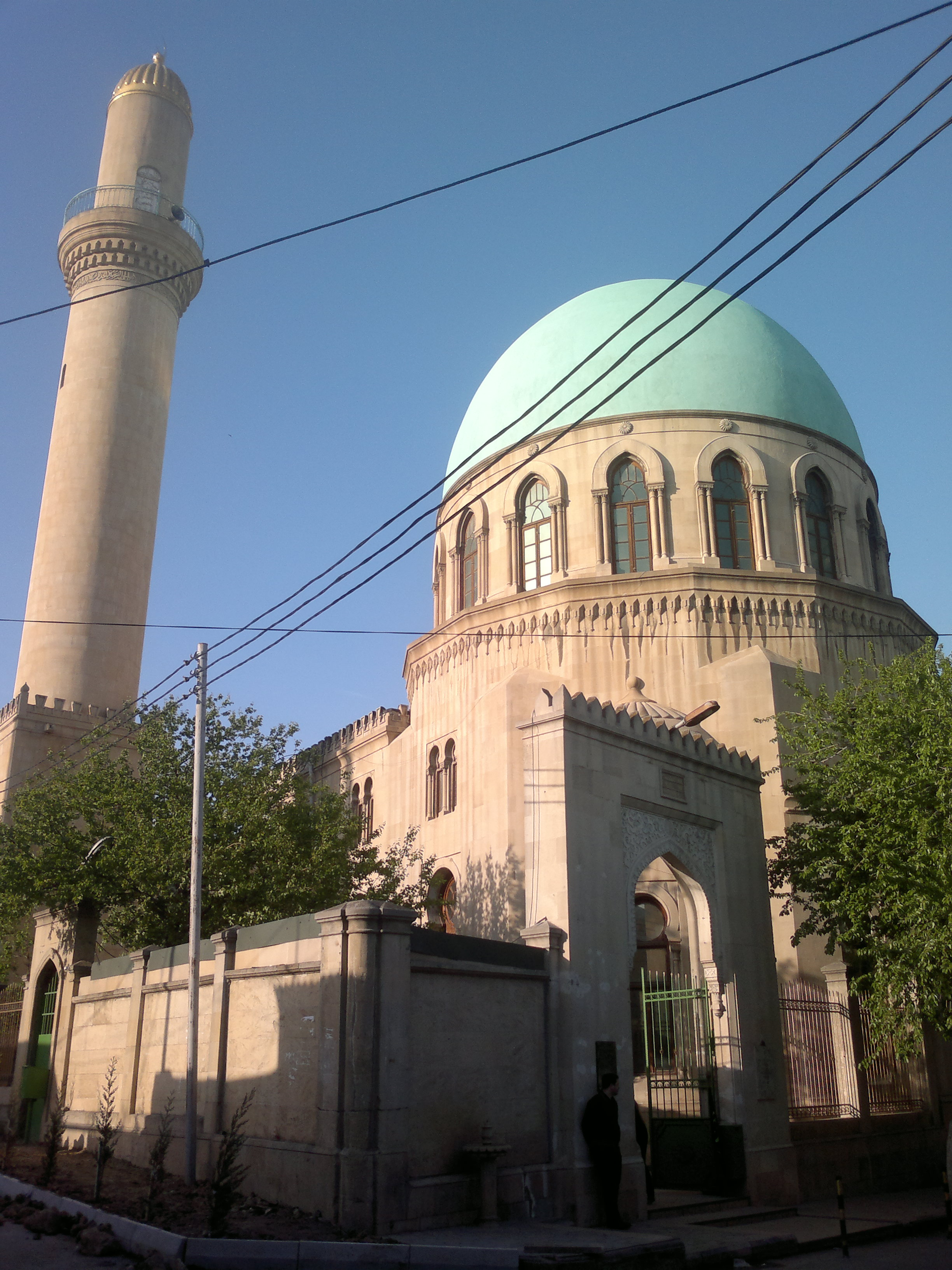
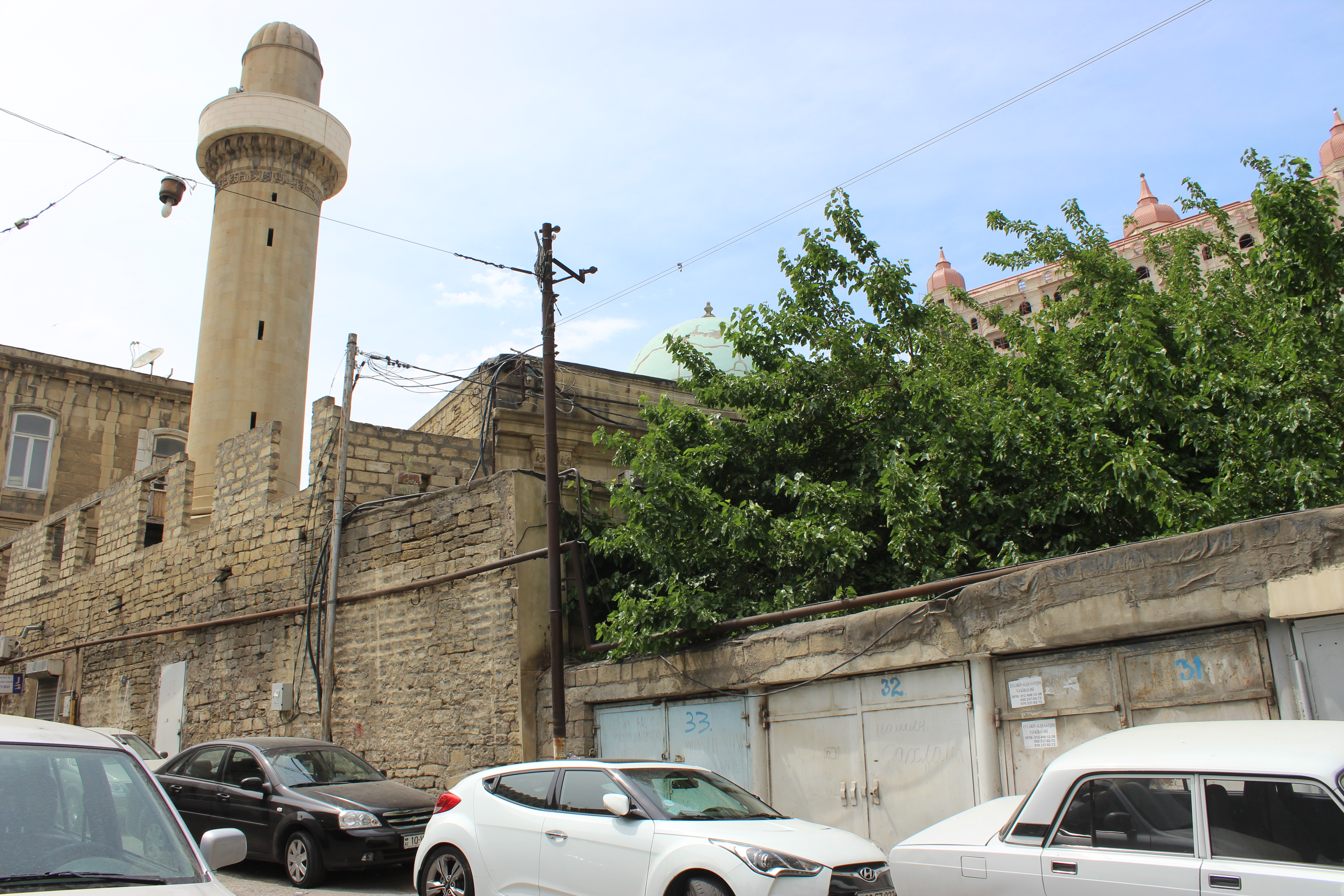
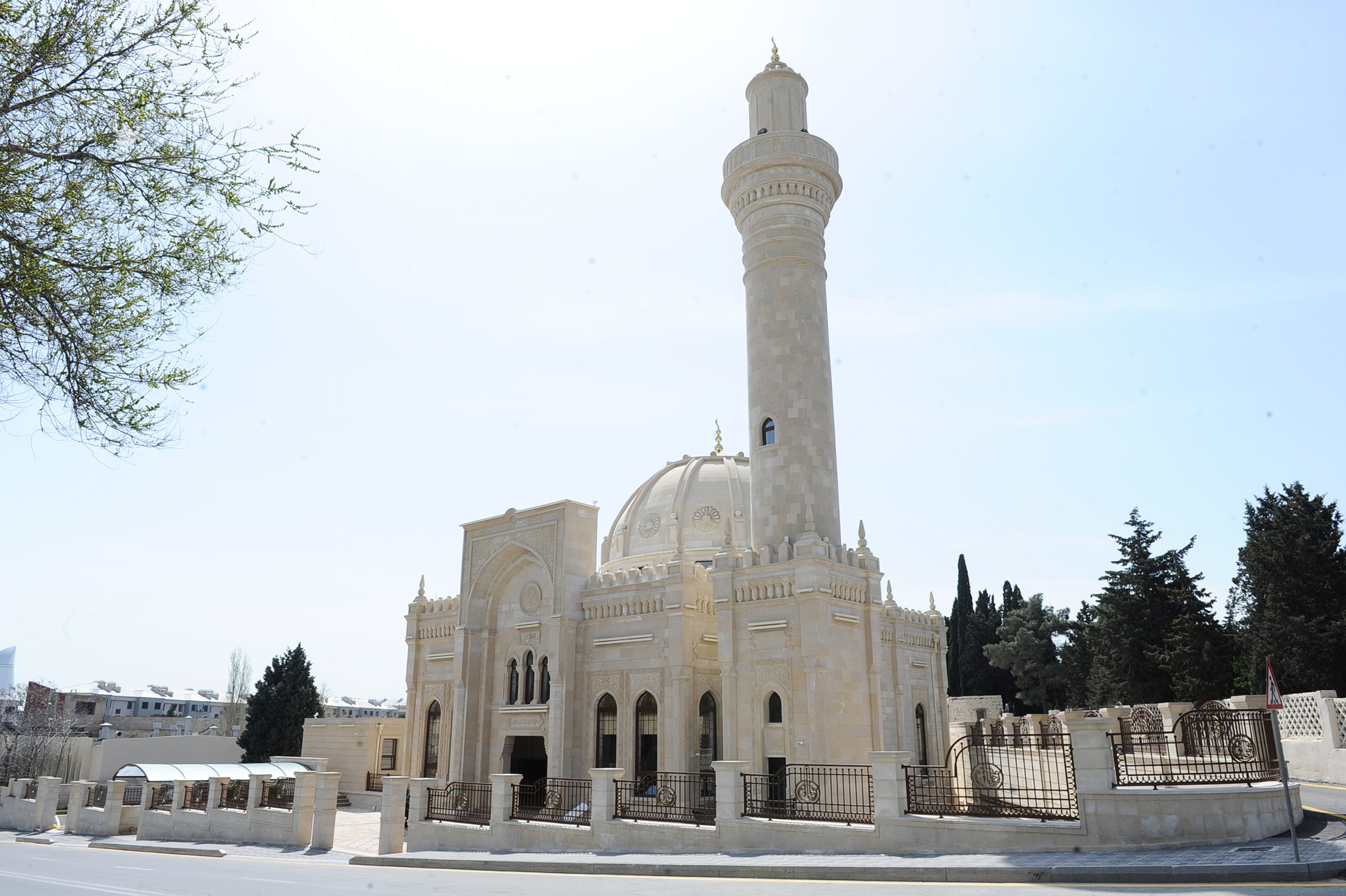
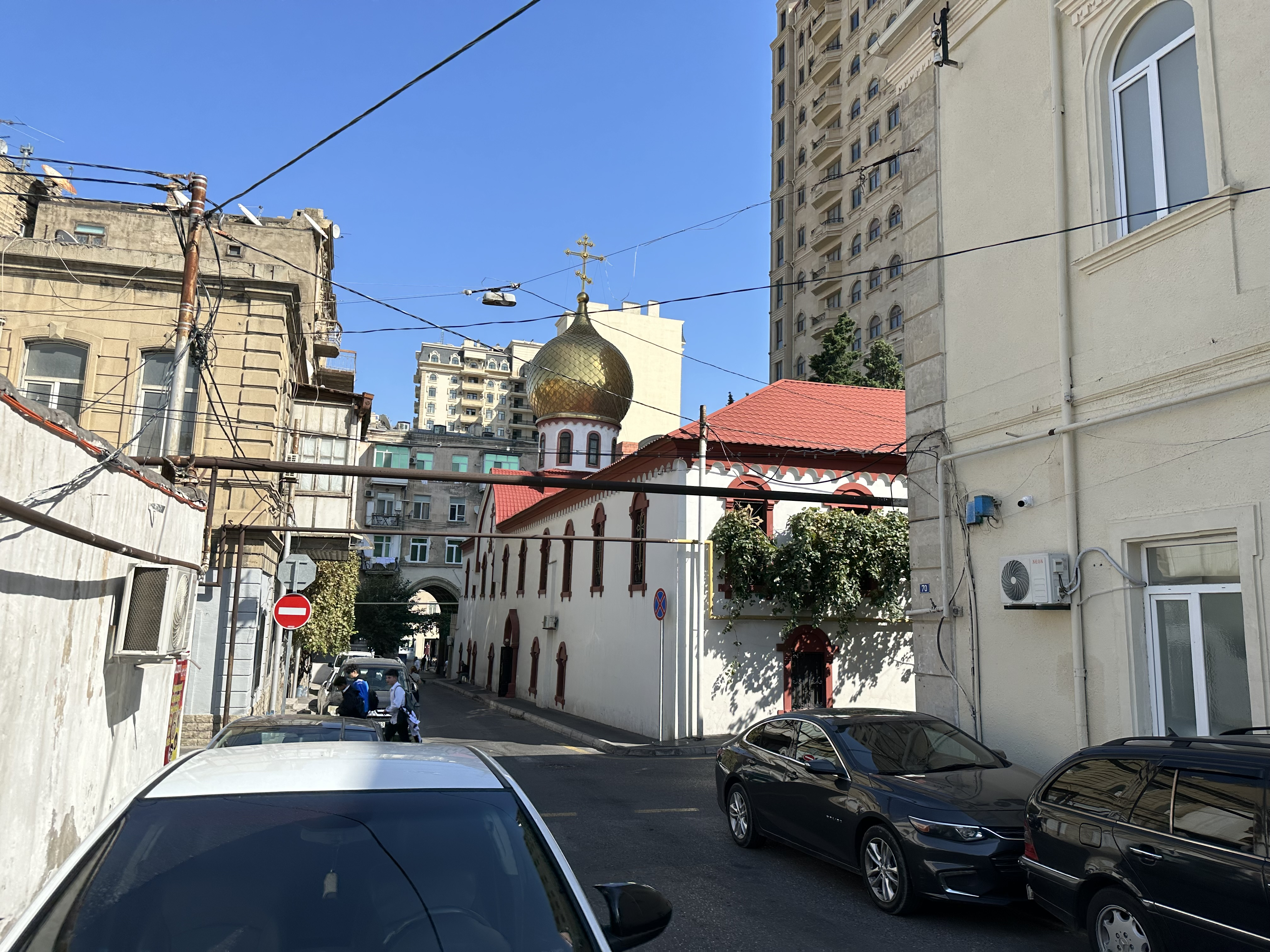
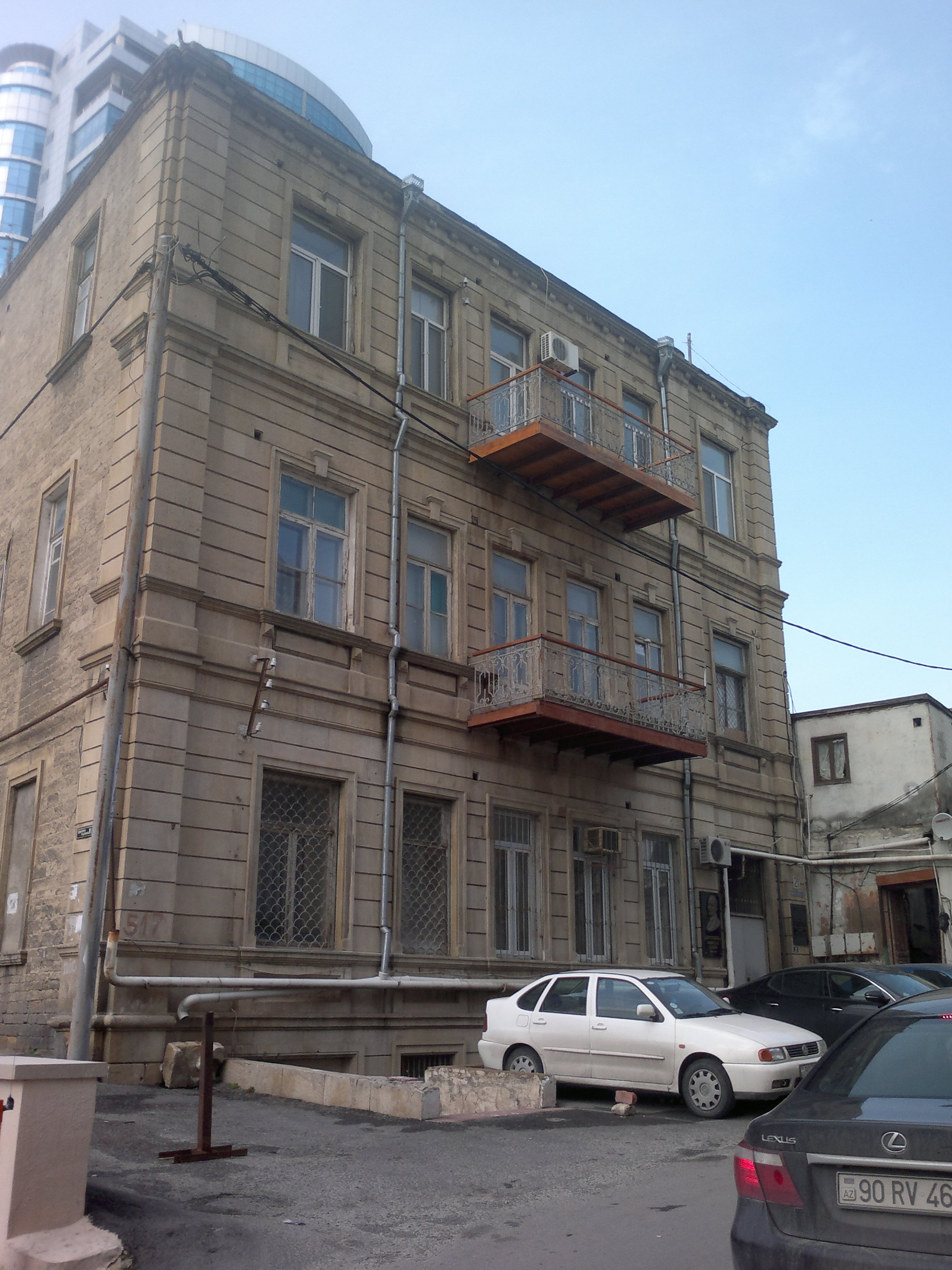
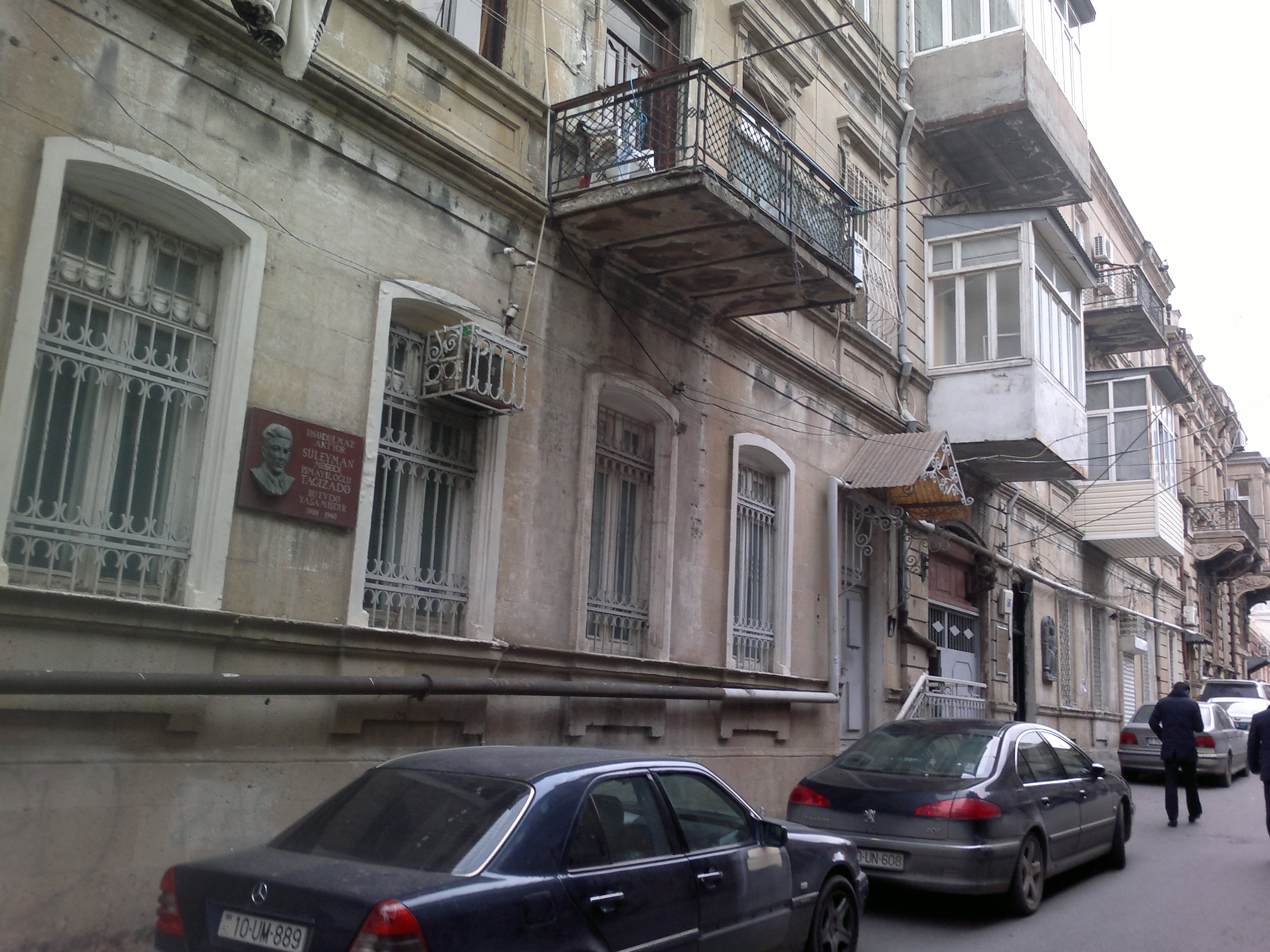
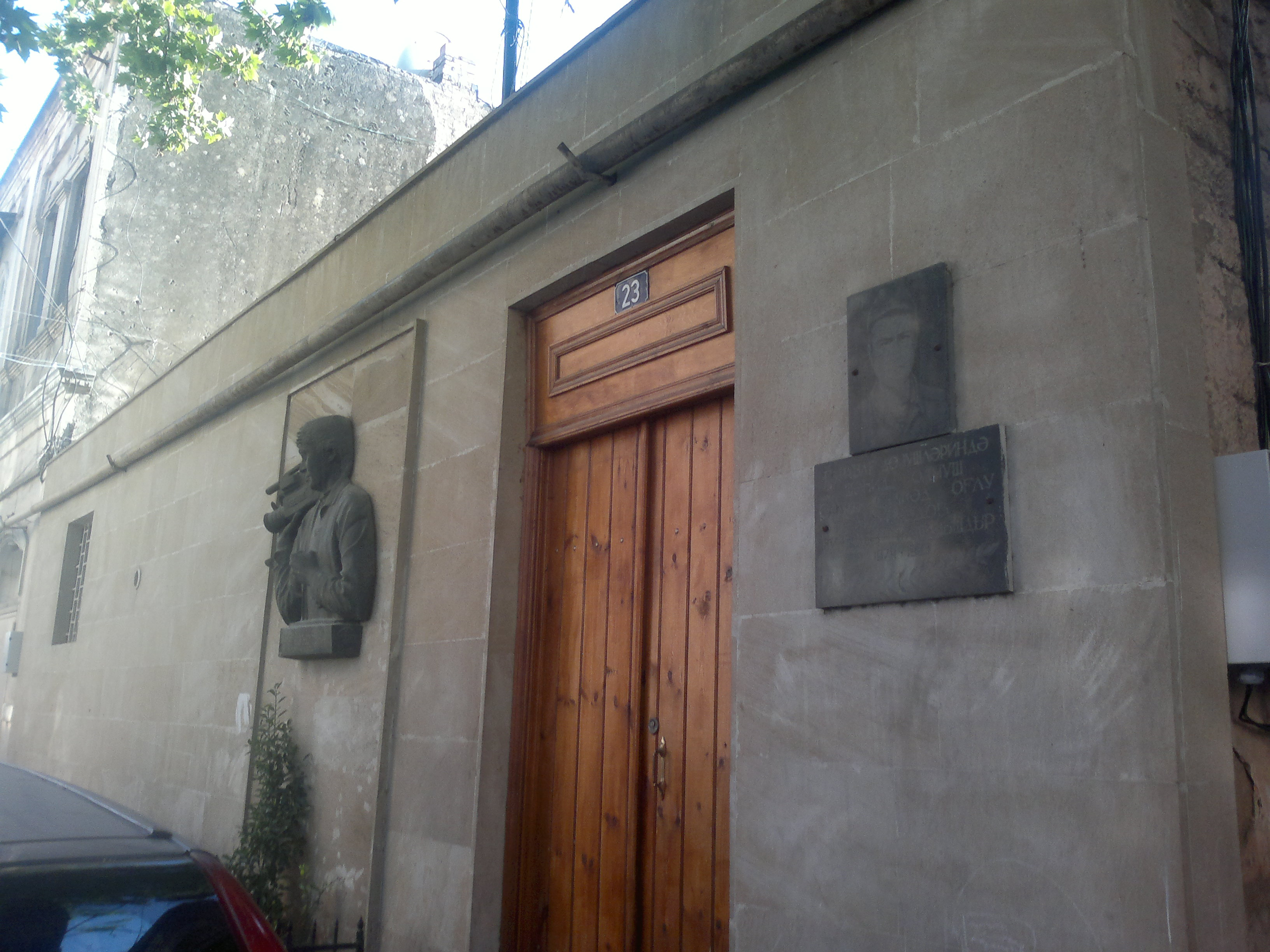
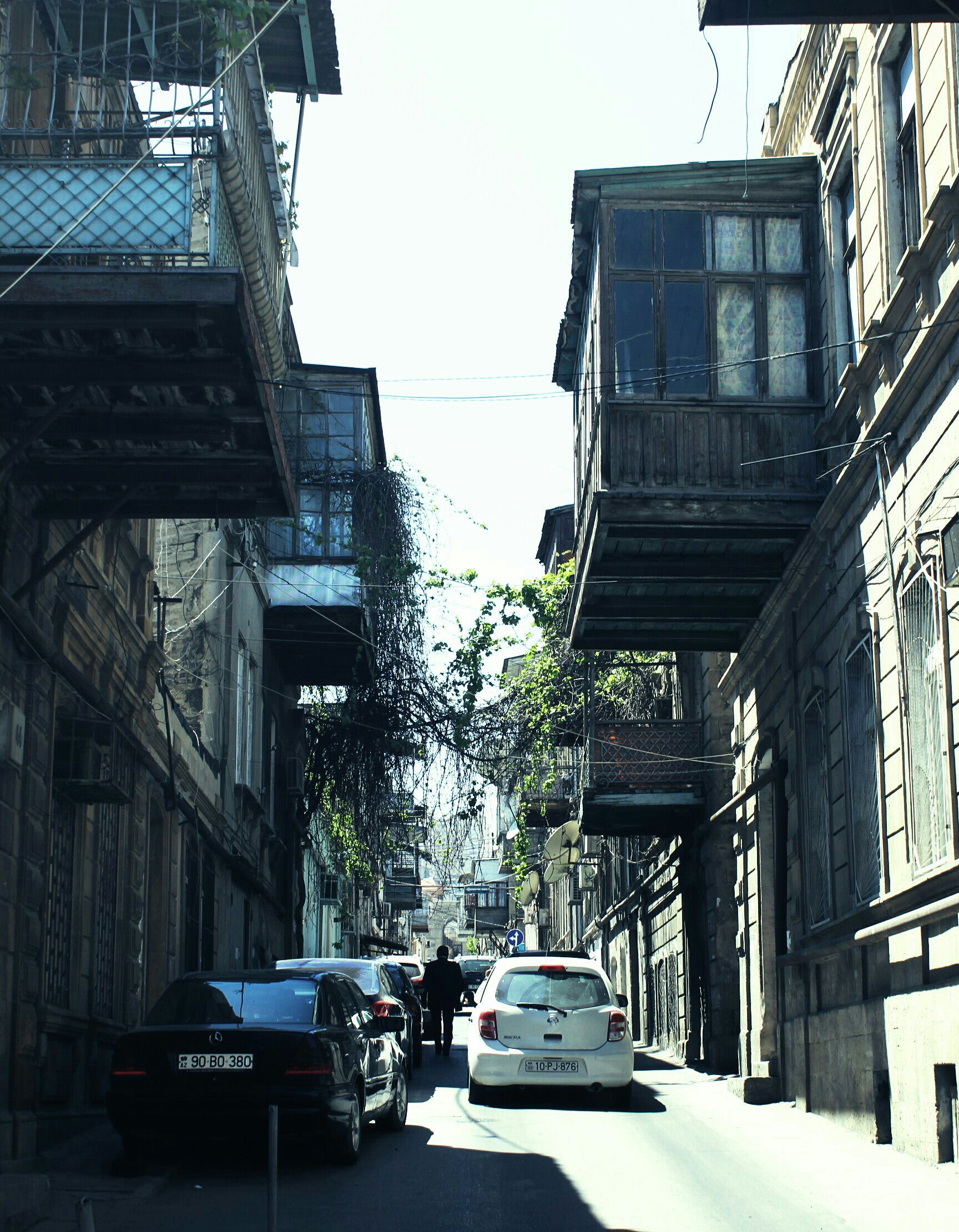
- Panorama of Sovetsky Taza Pir Mosque Haji Sultanali Mosque Gasimbey Mosque Haji Javad Mosque Church of Michael the Archangel House of Abdulla Shaig House of Jalil Mammadguluzade House of Chingiz Mustafayev One of the old streets in Sovetsky

- Location within Baku, Azerbaijan
- Coordinates: 40.375043°N 49.827045°E
- Country: Azerbaijan
- City: Baku
- District: Yasamal

Sovetsky (Azerbaijani: Sovetski,; Russian: Советская) is a historic district in Mirzaagha Aliyev Street, Baku, Azerbaijan. It is located in Yasamal raion, between Nariman Narimanov Avenue (former Sovetsky Avenue) and Mirza Ibrahimov Street, and between Nizami and Ibrahim Abilov streets. There are many historical buildings over a century old, museums, mosques, baths and houses of notable Azerbaijanis.

During renovation of the area in 2014–2016 many buildings were demolished, among them several cultural heritage monuments.

== Cultural heritage in Sovetsky ==
According to the law of Cabinet of Ministers of Azerbaijan (2 August 2001) there were more than 200 houses, 9 baths, 4 mosques, 1 church and 10 schools and hospitals in Sovetsky that are monuments of the local value. 3 Objects in this territory are the monuments of national value. They are Taza Pir Mosque, building of the Union of Architects of Azerbaijan and Haji Sultan Ali Mosque.

In March 2014 there were approximately 230 historical architectural monuments in Sovetskaya. Among them living buildings, mosques, church, baths, Shollar water towers.

Starting from 2014 according to general plan of Baku due to road construction works the population of Sovetsky is moving out and their houses started to be destructed. New roads will be the prolongation of Winter Boulevard and will locate from the building of Azerbaijan State Academic Drama Theatre to Nariman Narimaniv avenue, between Nizami metro station and Balababa Majidov, Abdulla Shaig and Suleyman Rahimov Streets. According to chairman of Moving Committee of Yasamal district Samad Islamov there are 171 historical buildings in this area and 76 of them will be destructed.

According to Minister of Culture and Tourism of Azerbaijan Abulfas Garayev 118 historical monuments in Sovetsky will not be destroyed. Some of them don't have such historical value but they will stay as museums, where notable people lived (as an example he noted house-museums of Abdulla Shaig and Jalil Mammadguluzade). Garayev also mentioned that approximately 30 buildings with architectural decors will be saved as well.

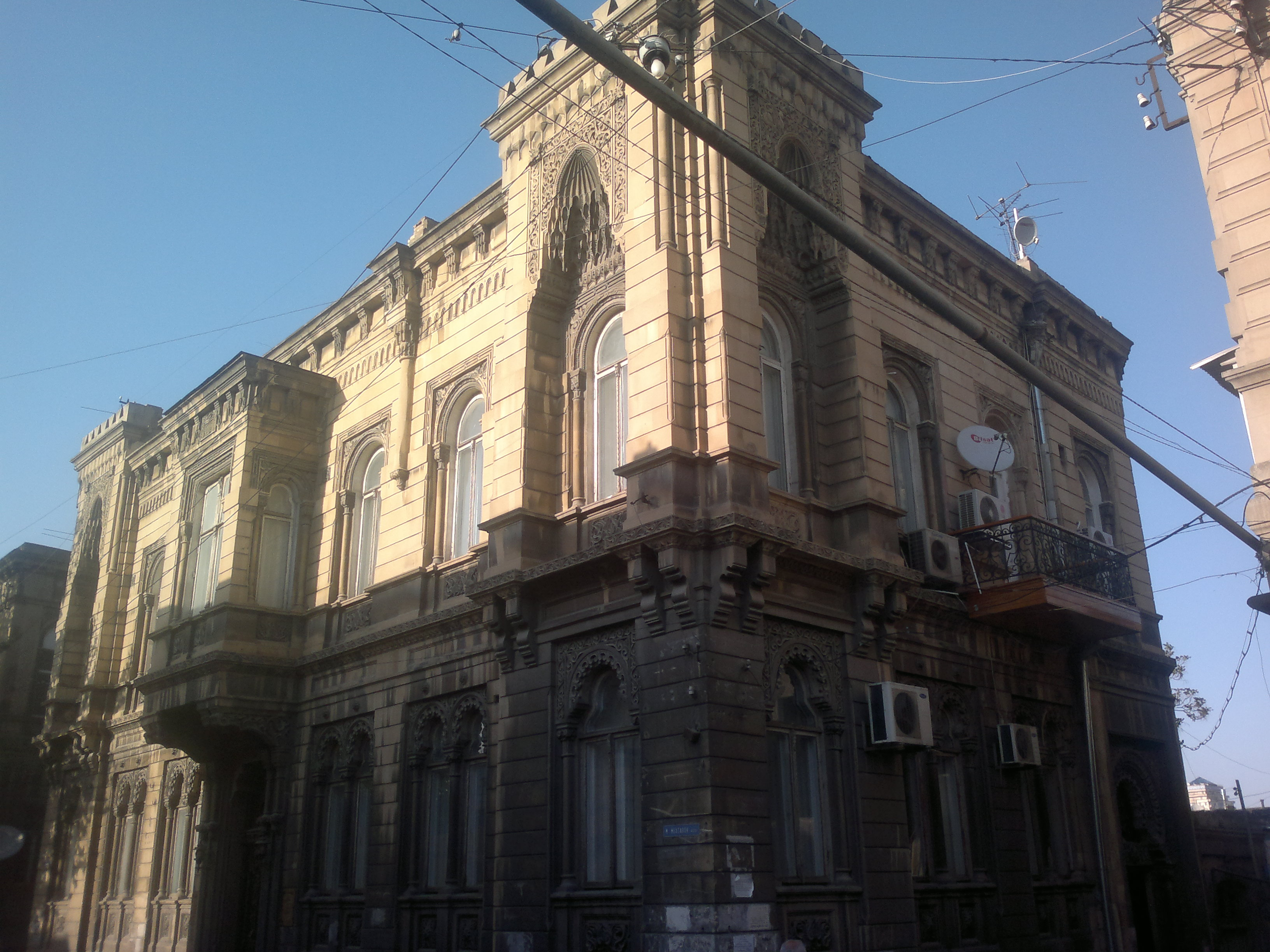
Building of the Union of Architects of Azerbaijan. Murtuza Mukhtarov Street 24 (built in 1899). Architect Eugeniusz Skibiński

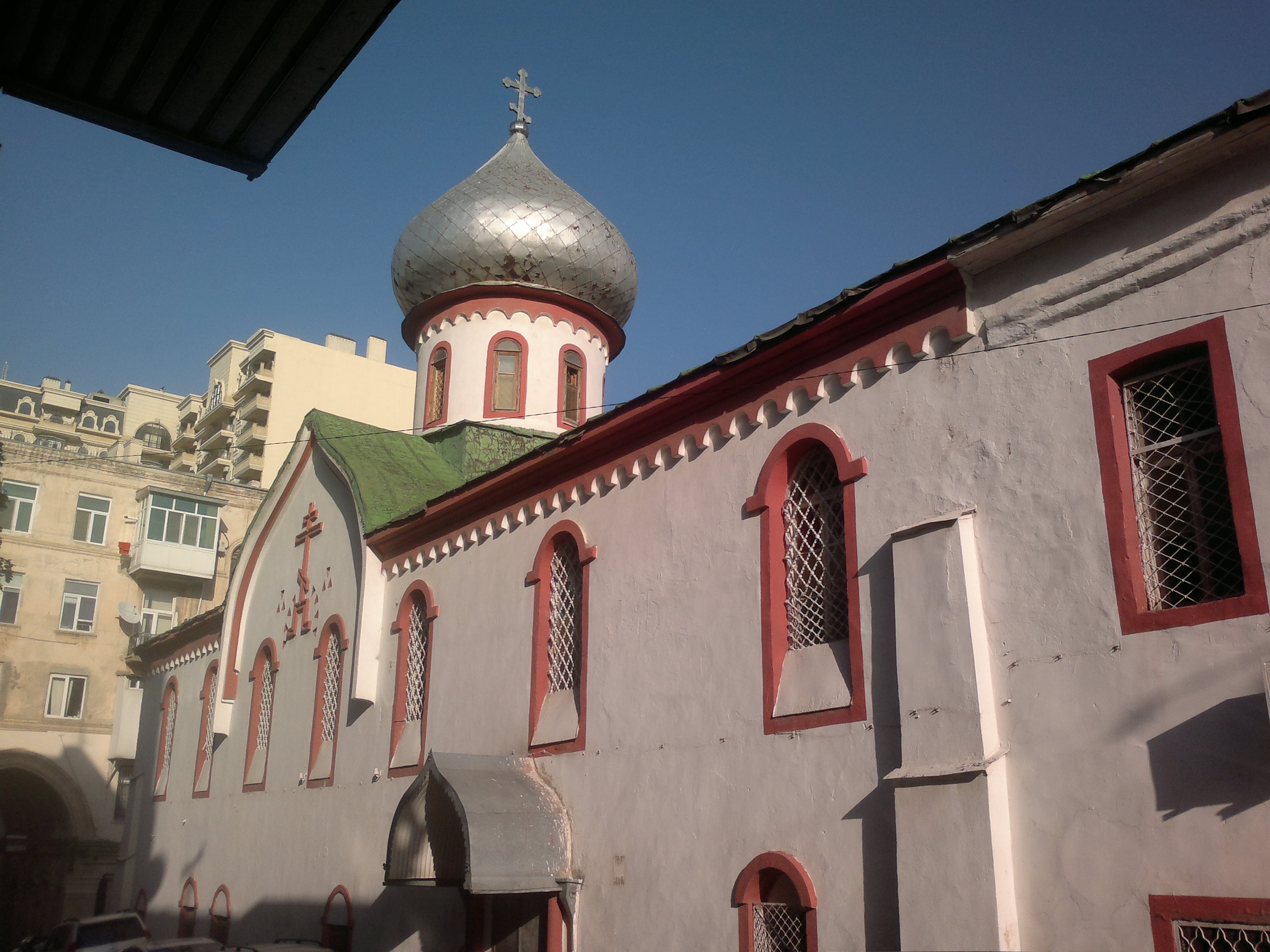
Russian Orthodox Church. Zargarpalan Street 38 (built in 1845)

=== Historical houses ===
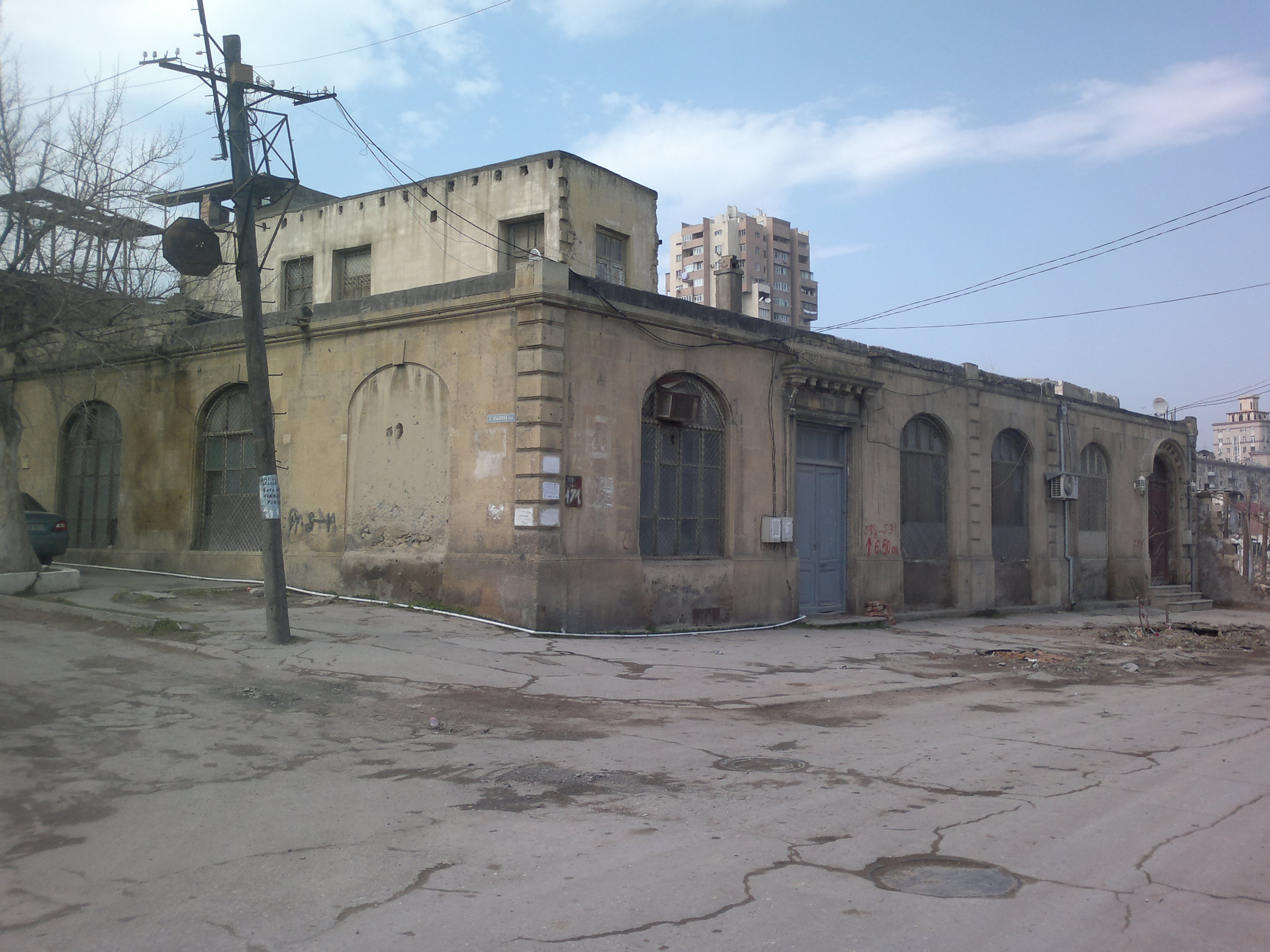
House built in 19th century. Abdulla Shaig Street 171

The building on Abdulla Shaig Street 171 was built in 1338 of hijra calendar. At the 7th Mirza Fatali Lane 8 famous Azerbaijani singer Shovkat Alakbarova was born and lived. People's Artist Ilham Namig Kamal was lived at the neighbouring house № 9.

At the house on 1st Abdulla Shaig Lane Peoples' Artist Eldaniz Zeynalov, actor Hasanagha Salayev and famous mugham singer Khan Shushinski lived. According to residents one of these lanes was destroyed in 2013 and on its place parking for skyscraper (“Sapphire plaza” business center) was built. The house, where Abdulla Shaig lived from 1914 till 1957 is also located here. Today the house-museum of Shaig is situated at this house.

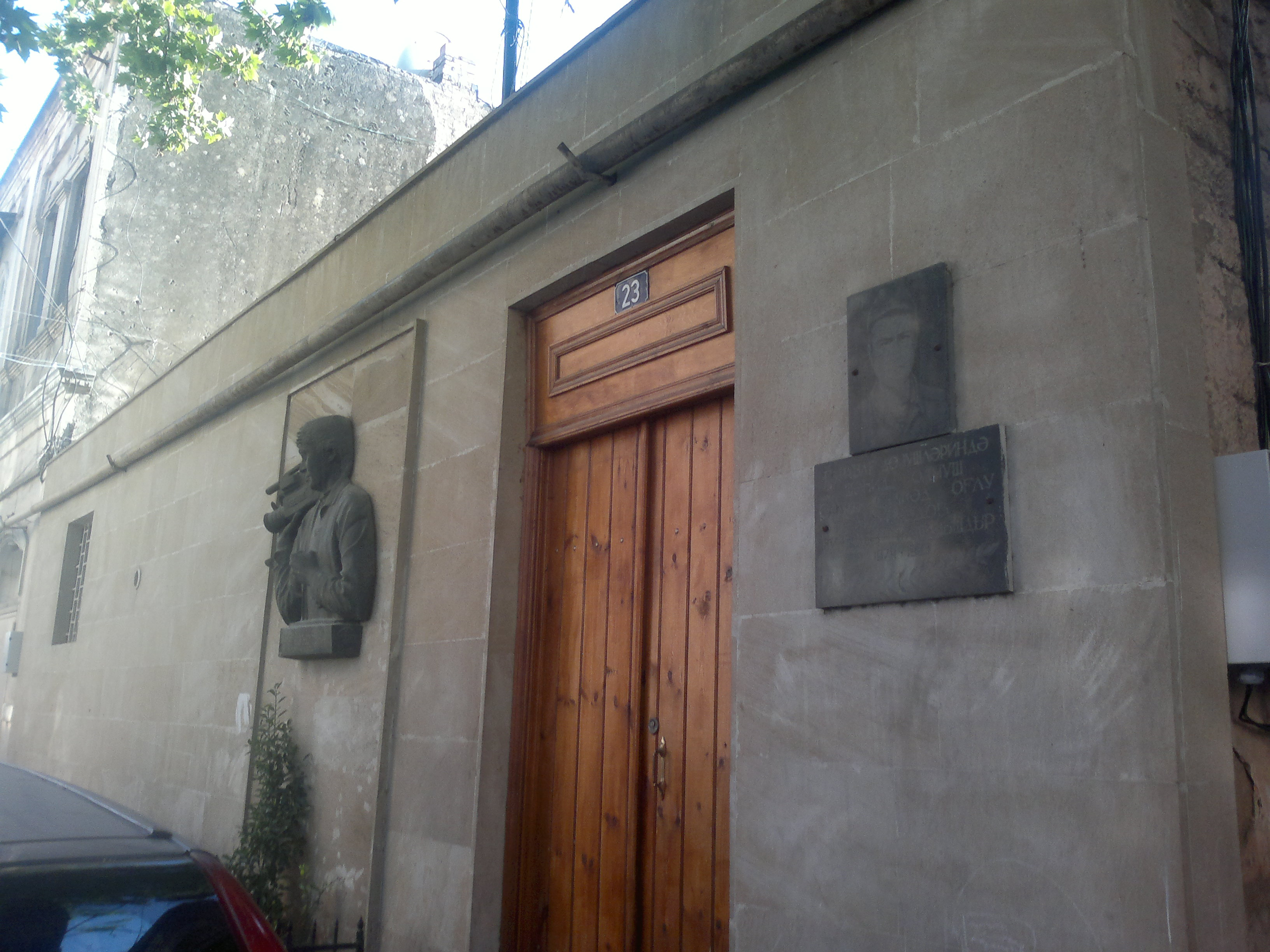
House of Chingiz Mustafayev (Murtuza Muxtarov Street, 23)

At the cross of Suleyman Taghizade and Zargarpalan Street famous turkologist Khalid Khojayev lived in 1924-1937. The house-museum of famous Azerbaijani writer and publicist Jalil Mammadguluzade is located at Suleyman Taghizade Street 56. On the neighbouring house (№ 58) actor Suleyman Taghizade lived. His name was given to this street (former Pochtovaya and Ostrovskaya).

Revolutionary Hashim Aliyev lived in the house on Nabat Ashurbayova Street 82. His memorial desk was located on the facade of the building as well. At the house on Mirza Agha Aliyev Street 115 (built in 1910) famous Azerbaijani actor, Peoples' Artist Abbas Mirza Sharifzadeh lived. Azerbaijani journalist Osman Mirzayev (died at Garakend aircrash) lived at the house on Mirza Agha Aliyev Street 102 (built in 1916). House of another journalist, National Hero of Azerbaijan Chingiz Mustafayev is also located at Sovetsky (Murtuza Muxtarov Street, 23).

Writer Rustam Ibragimbekov also was born at Sovetsky. According to him, he grew up at the mahallah between Akhund bath and Komurchu square, his personality was formed there. In 1903 Jafar Jabbarly moved to Daghly mahallah of Sovetsky. Today his house museum is located at the house on Ismayil Gutgashinly Street 44. Azerbaijani poet Mikayil Mushfig was on at the same mahalla in 1908. Till his arrest in 1937 he lived at the house on SUleyman Rahimov Street 108.

Famous Azerbaijani composer Uzeyir Hajibeyov was lived at Shamil Azizbekov 67 of Sovetsky. Today his house-museum is located here. Estate of Mammad Amin Rasulzade's father was located at Sovetsky as well. It was situated on the place of Nizami Ganjavi metro station. Some period Rasulzade lived at this house.

The building on Mirza Fatali Street 45 was built in 1909 was belonged to Shirinbey, who migrated with his wife Zamina khanum abroad after occupation of Azerbaijan in 1920 by Russian troops. After them Russian family lived here. Then this house was moved to Faig Aliyev who lives here more than 50 years.

Houses of famous persons in Sovetsky

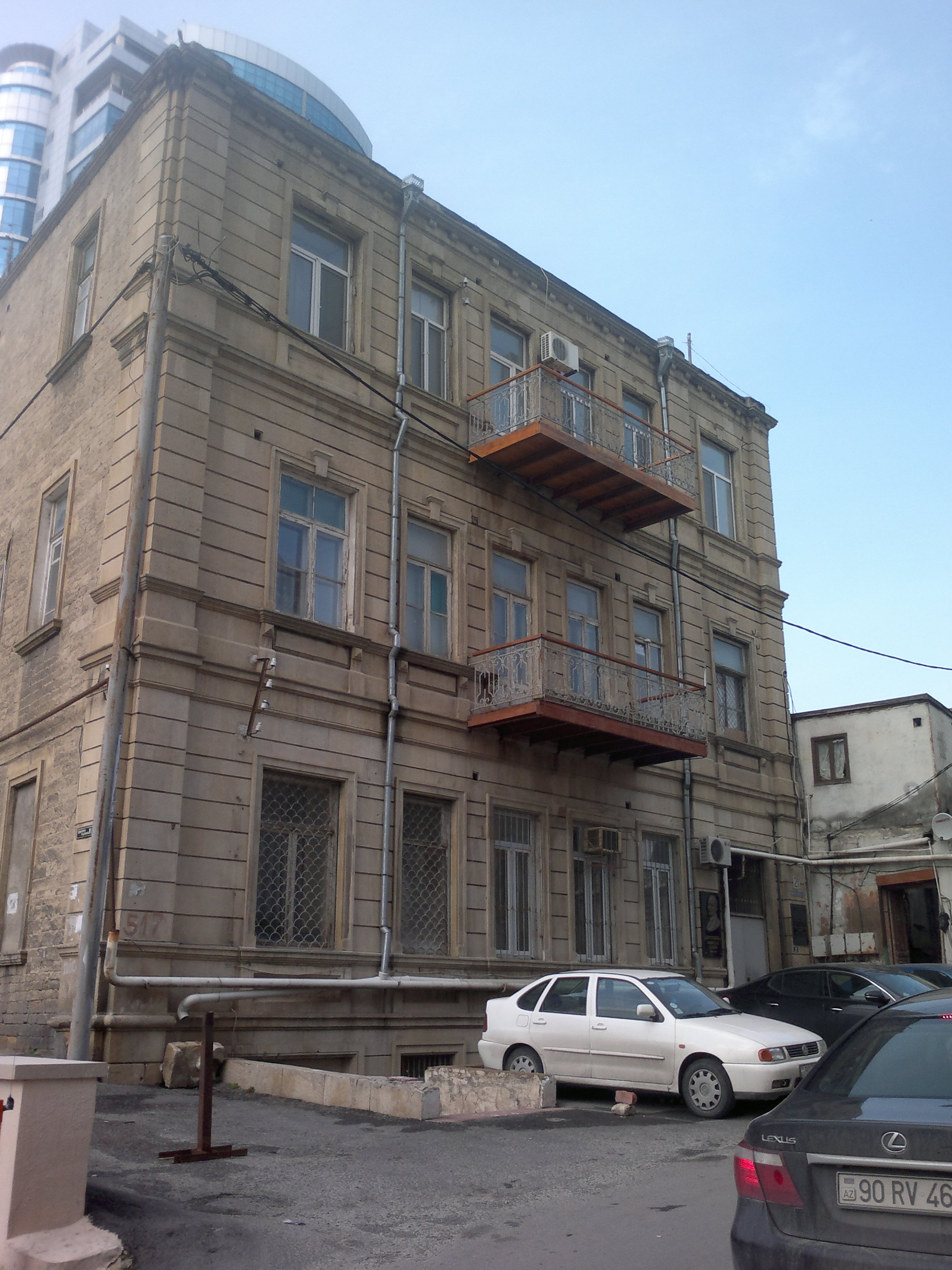
House, where Abdulla Shaig lived from 1914 till 1957. Abdulla Shaig Street 21

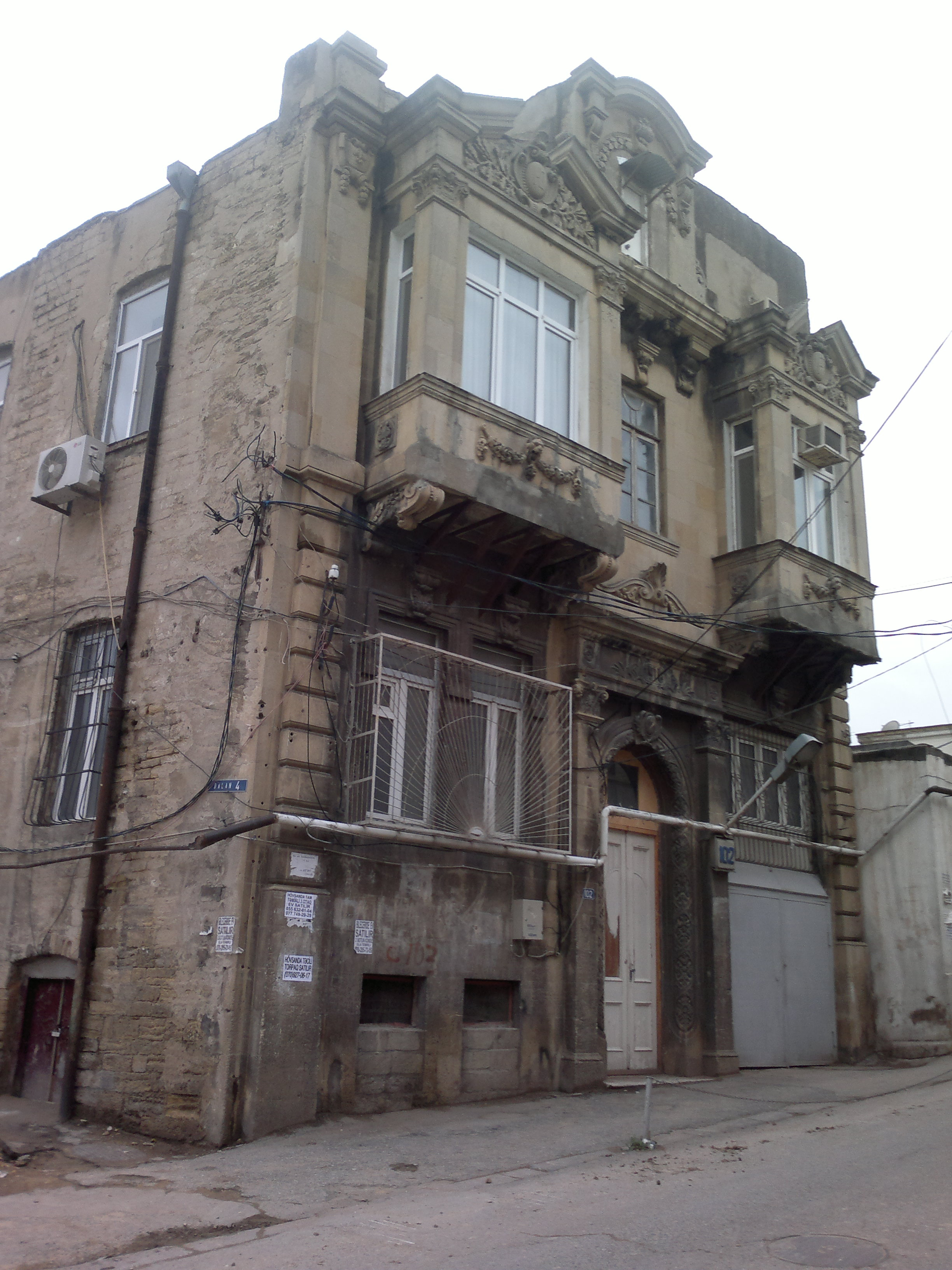
House, where Osman Mirzayev lived. Mirza Agha Aliyev Street 102 (built in 1916)

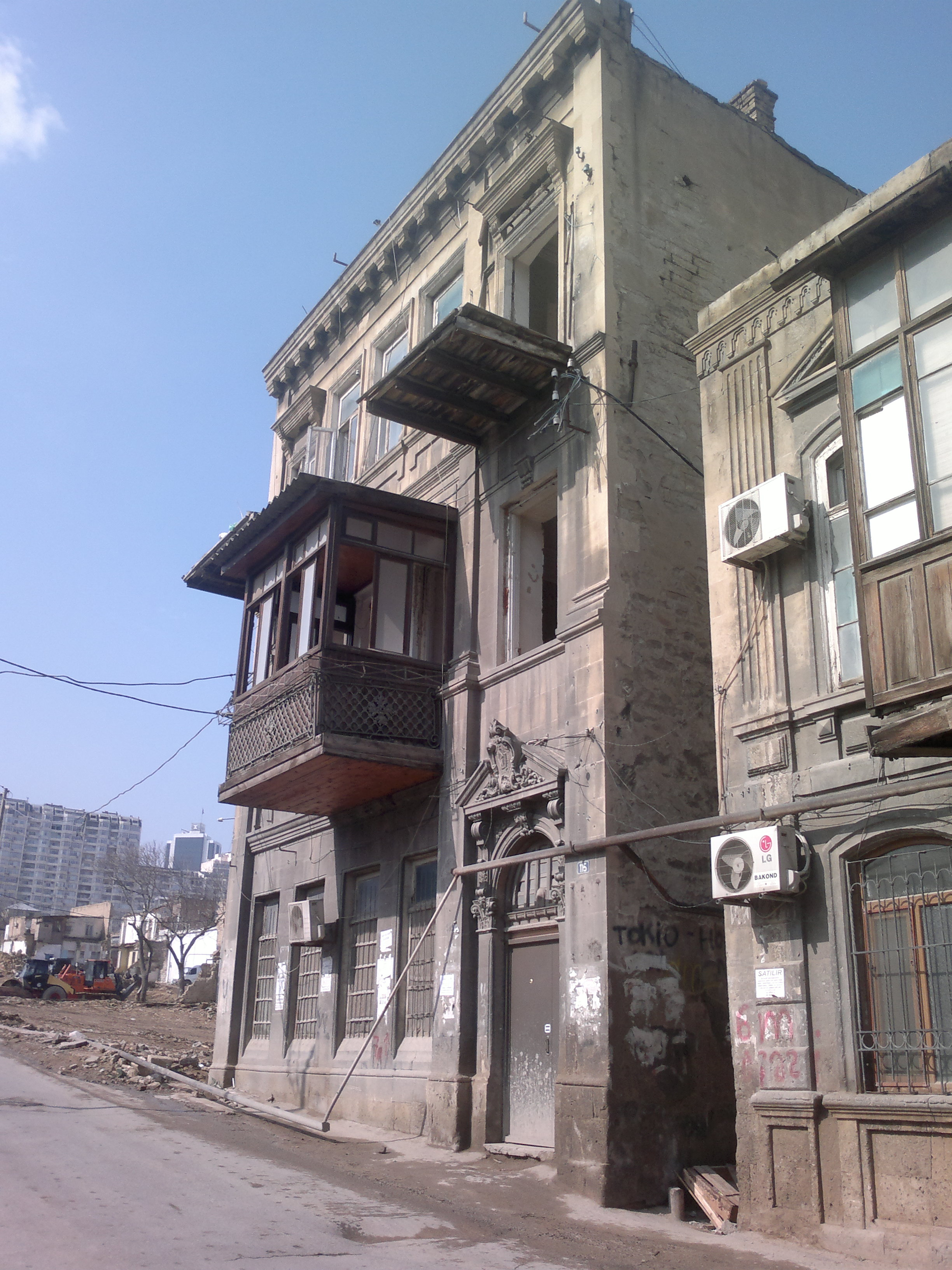
House, where Abbas Mirza Sharifzadehn lived. Mirza Agha Aliyev Street 115 (built in 1910)

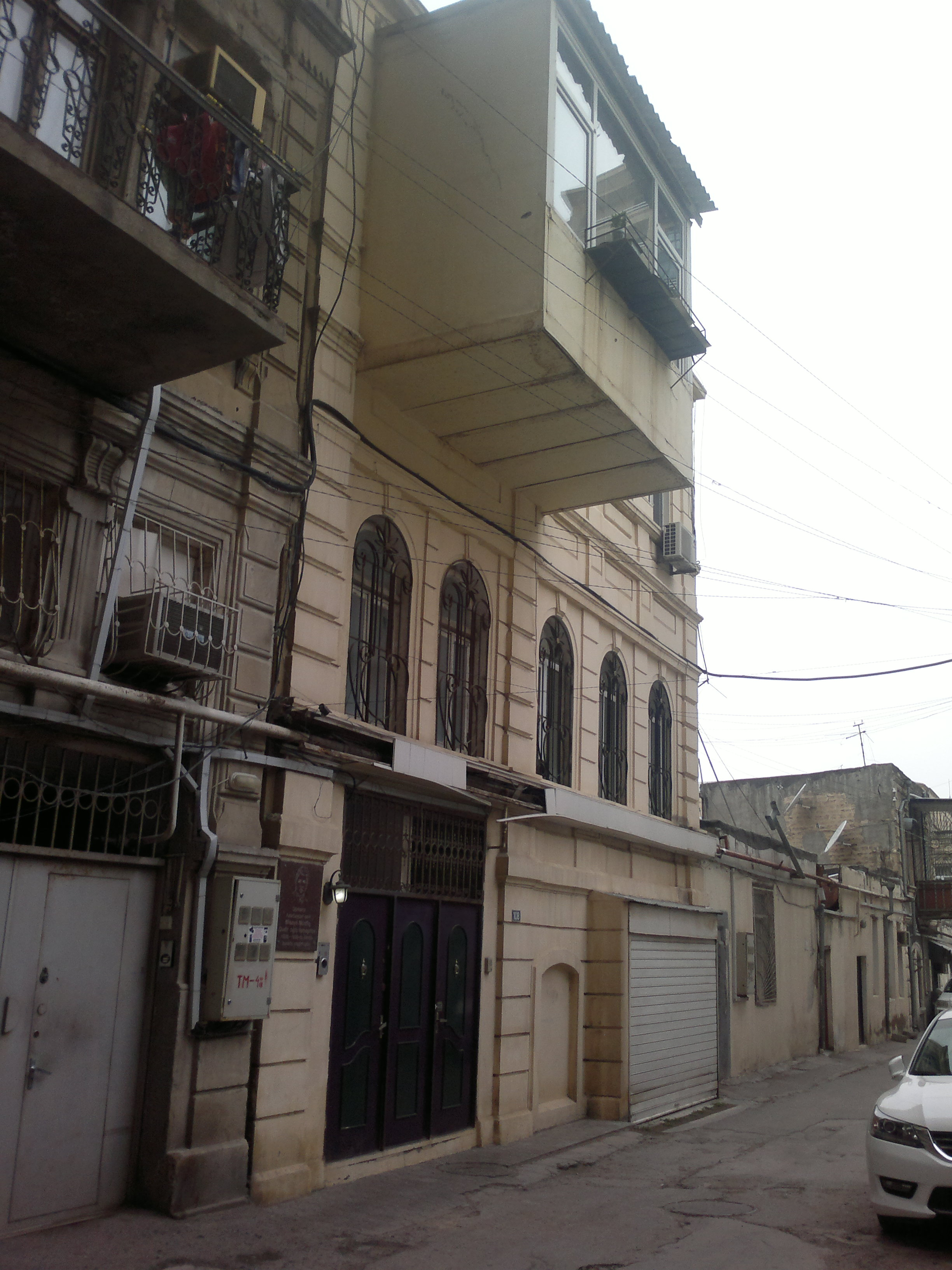
House, where Mikayil Mushfig lived. Suleyman Rahimov Street 108

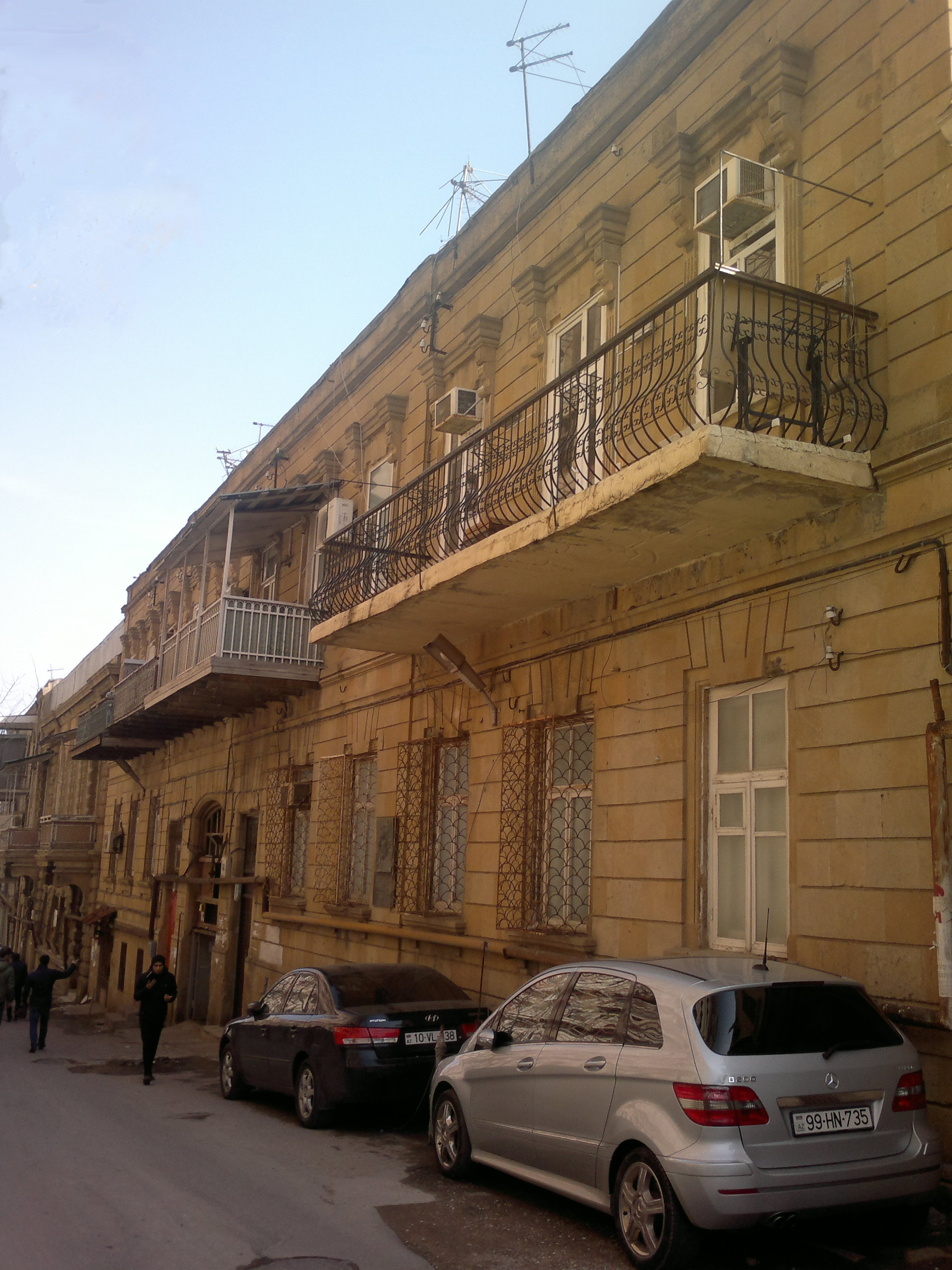
House, where Javad Malik-Yeganov lived. Süleyman Taghizadə Street 68 (built in 1896)
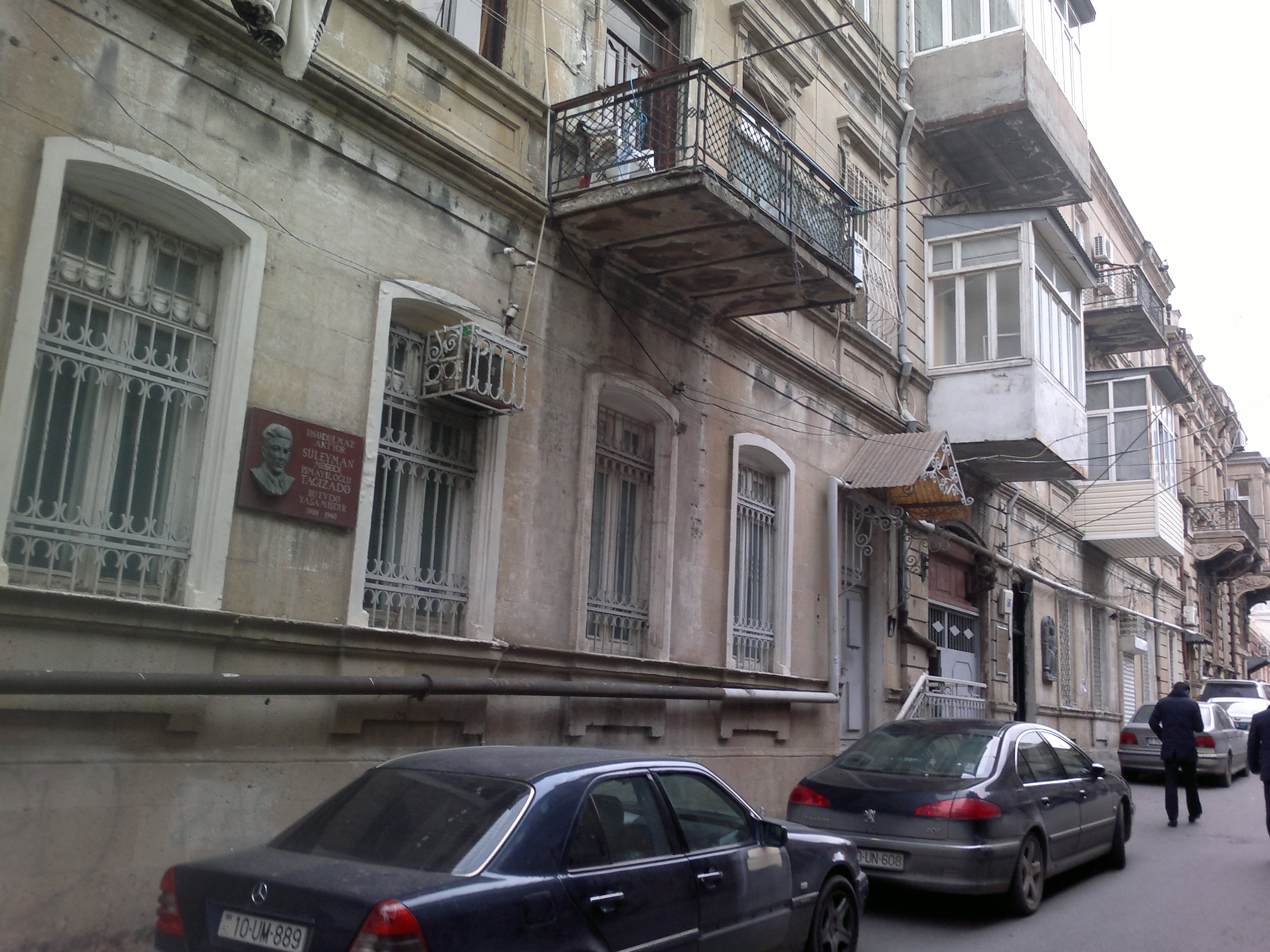
House, where Jalil Mammadguluzade lived. Suleyman Taghizadə Street 56 (built in 1907)

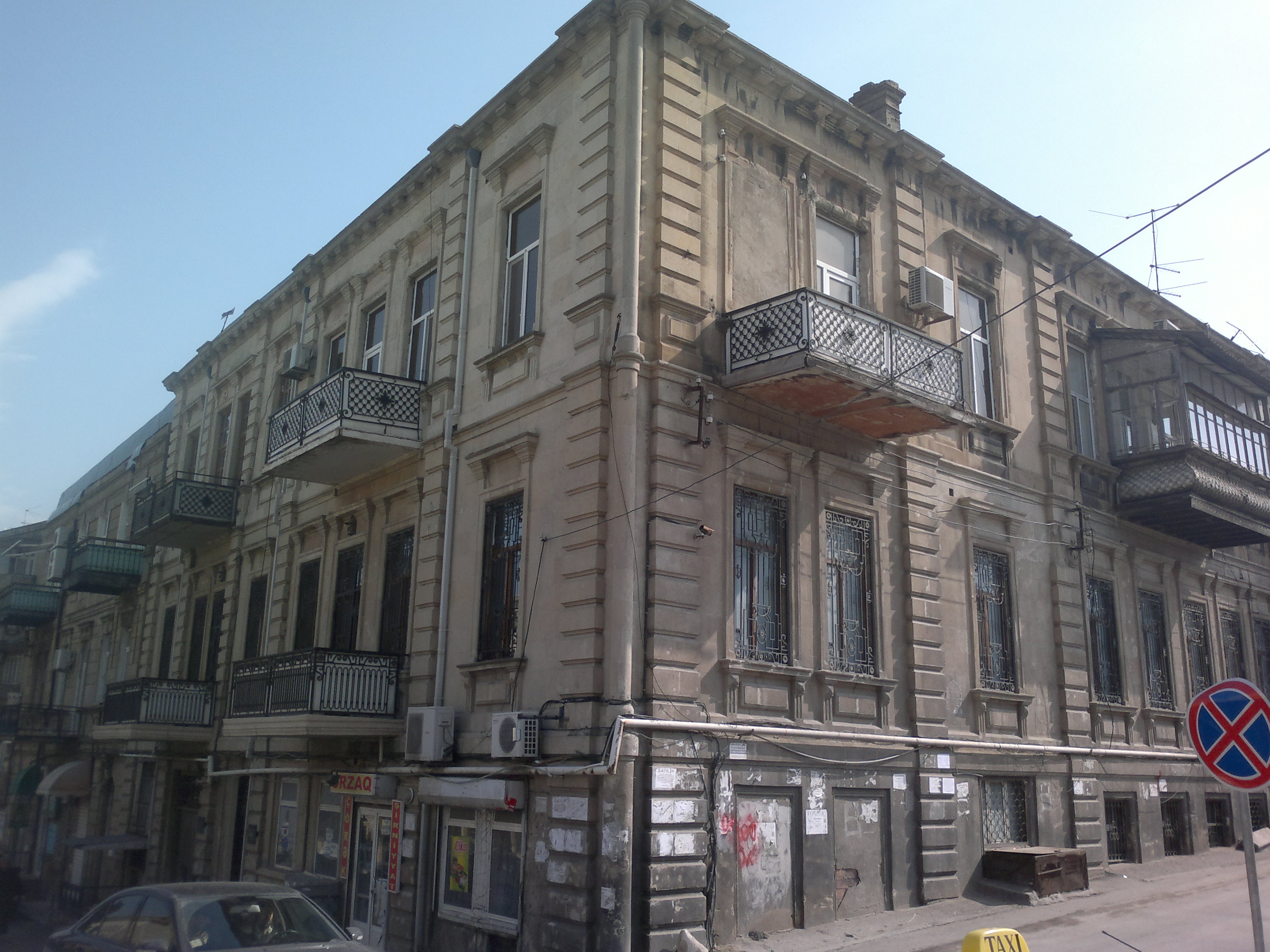
House, where Ahmad Rajabli lived. Mirza Agha Aliyev Street 126 (built in 1890)

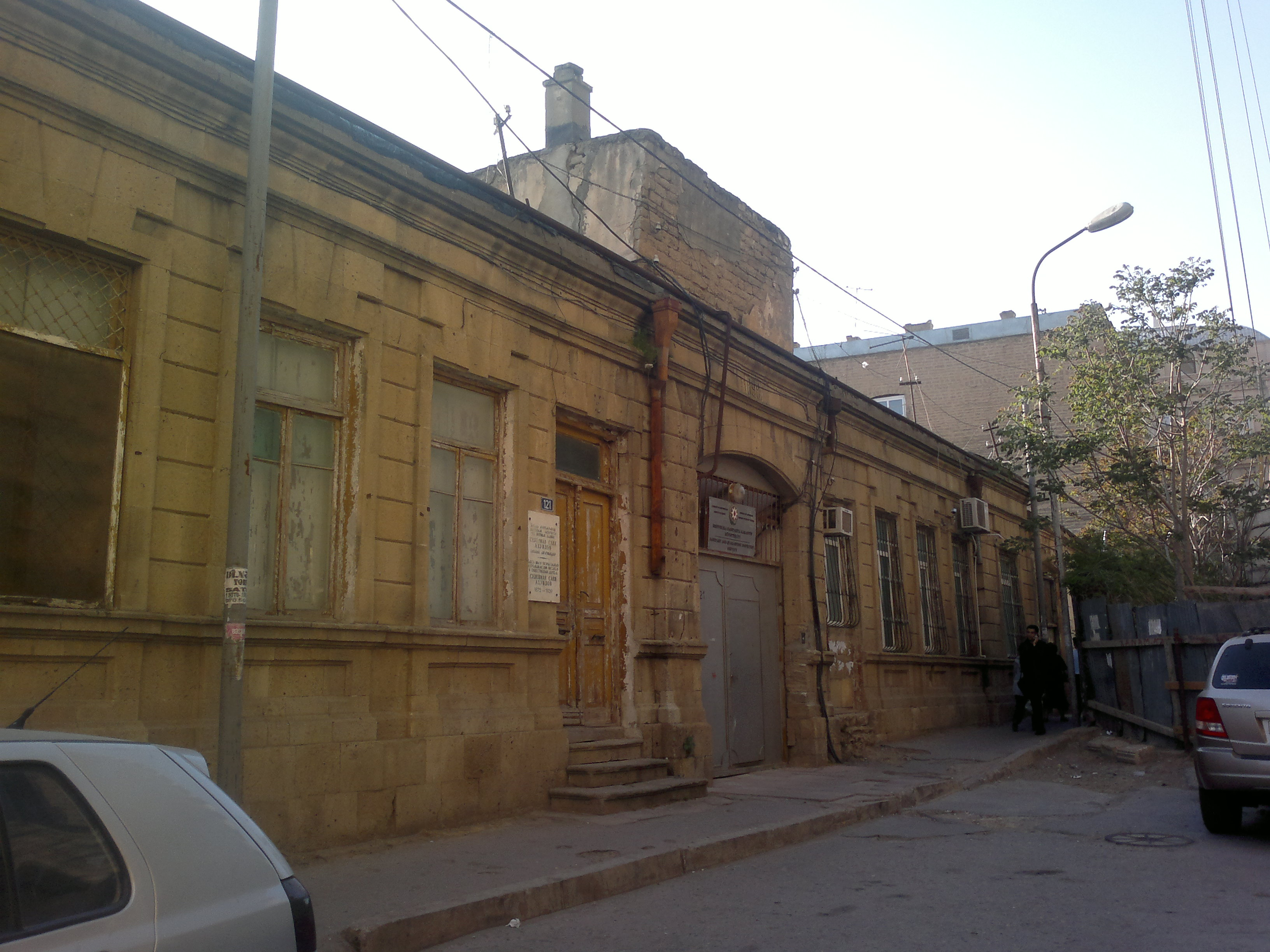
House, where Suleyman Sani Akhundov lived. Zargarpalan Street 121

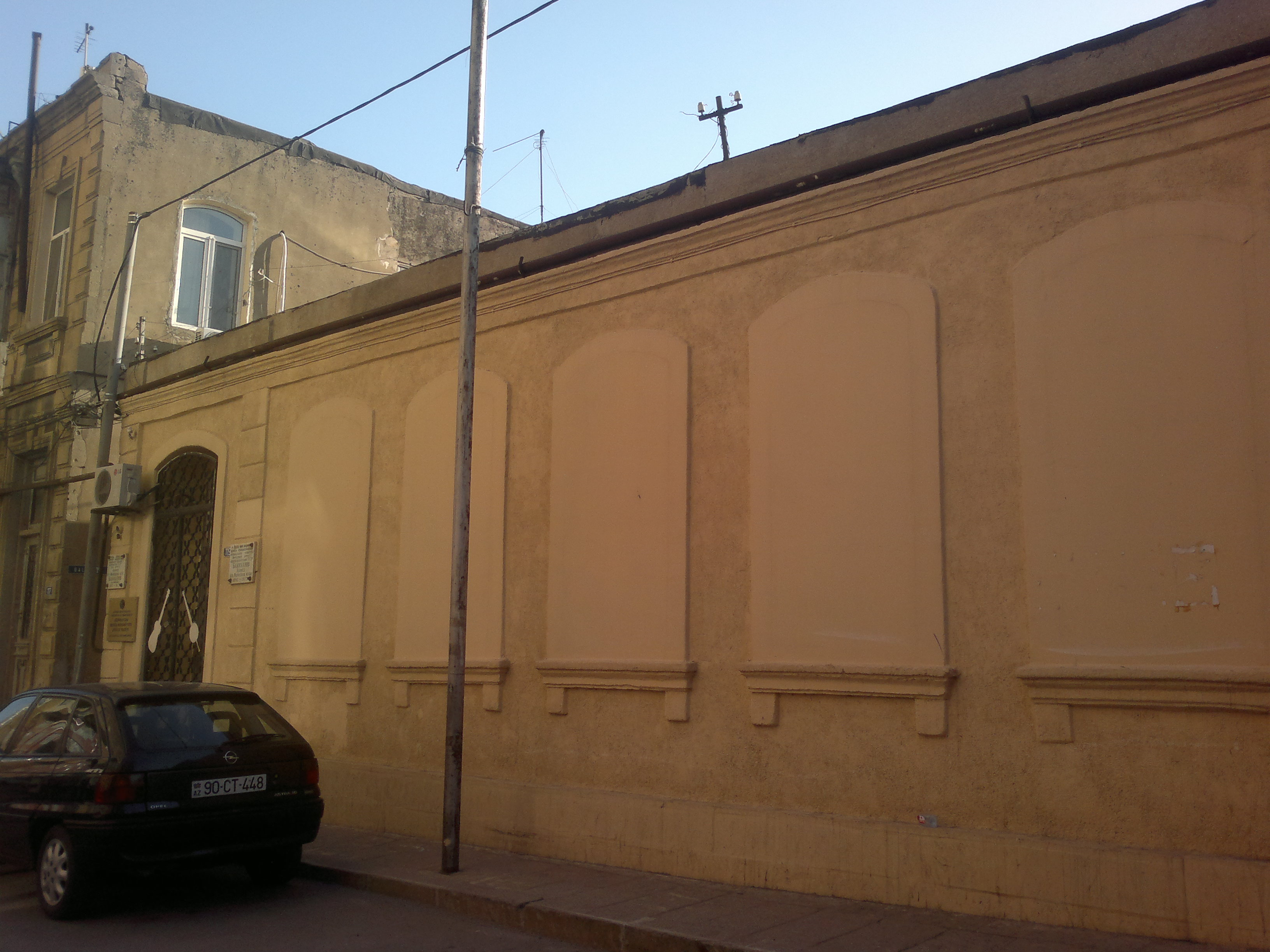
House, where Ahmad Bakikhanov lived. Zargarpalan Street 119
Houses with unique architectural elements at their facades in Sovetsky

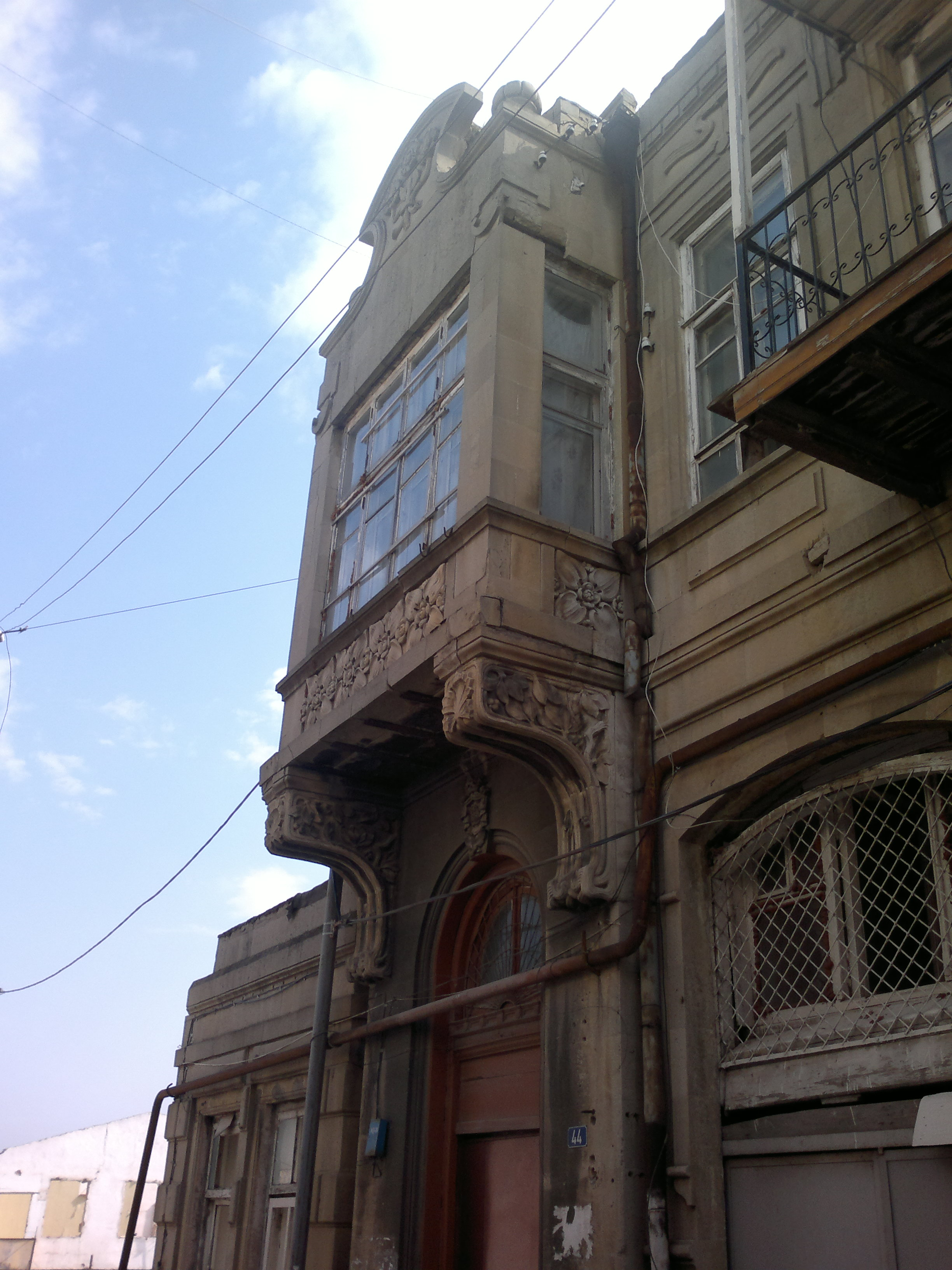
Suleyman Rahimov Street, 44 (built in 1900)

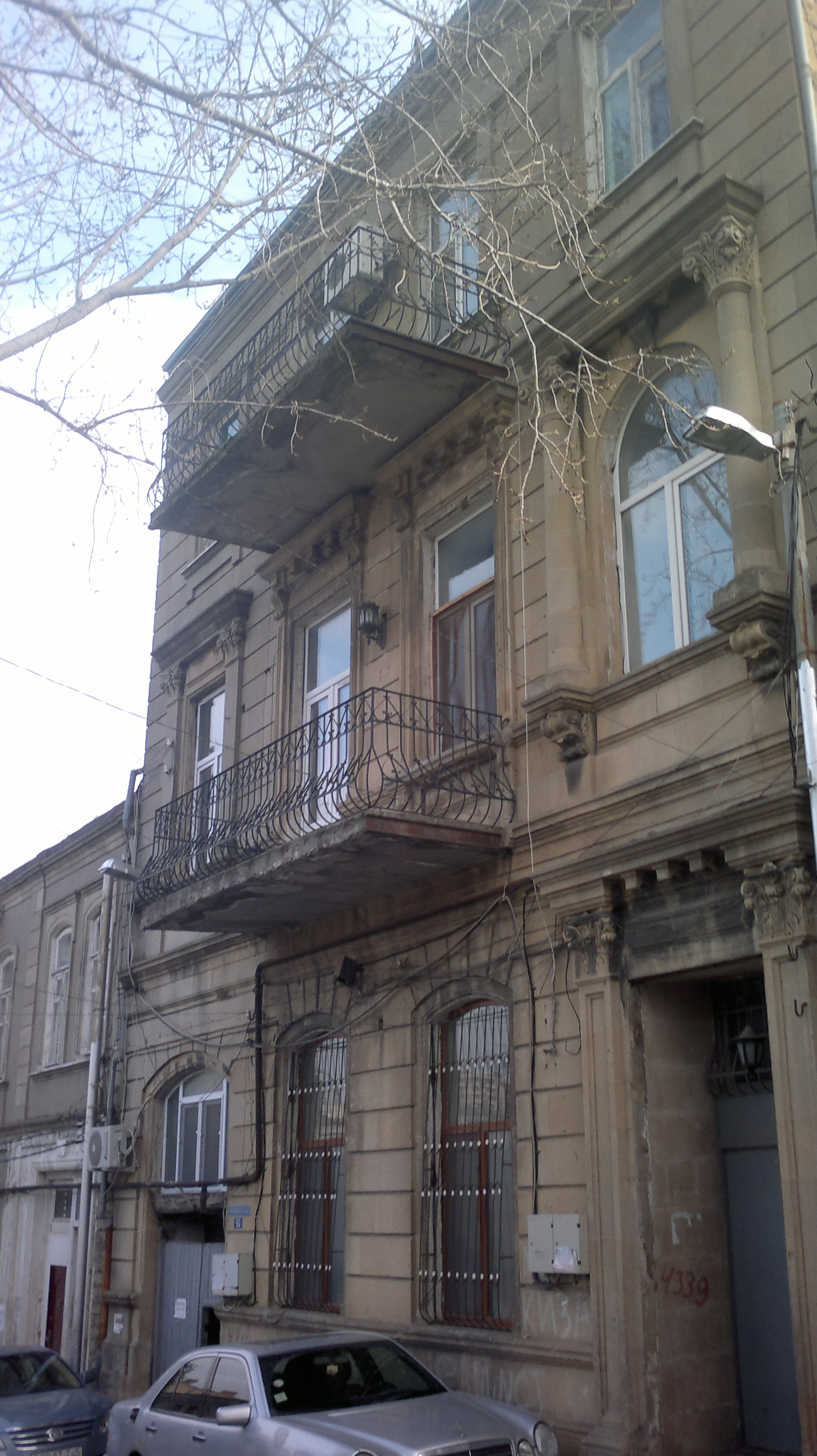
Vidadi Street, 50 (built in 1903)

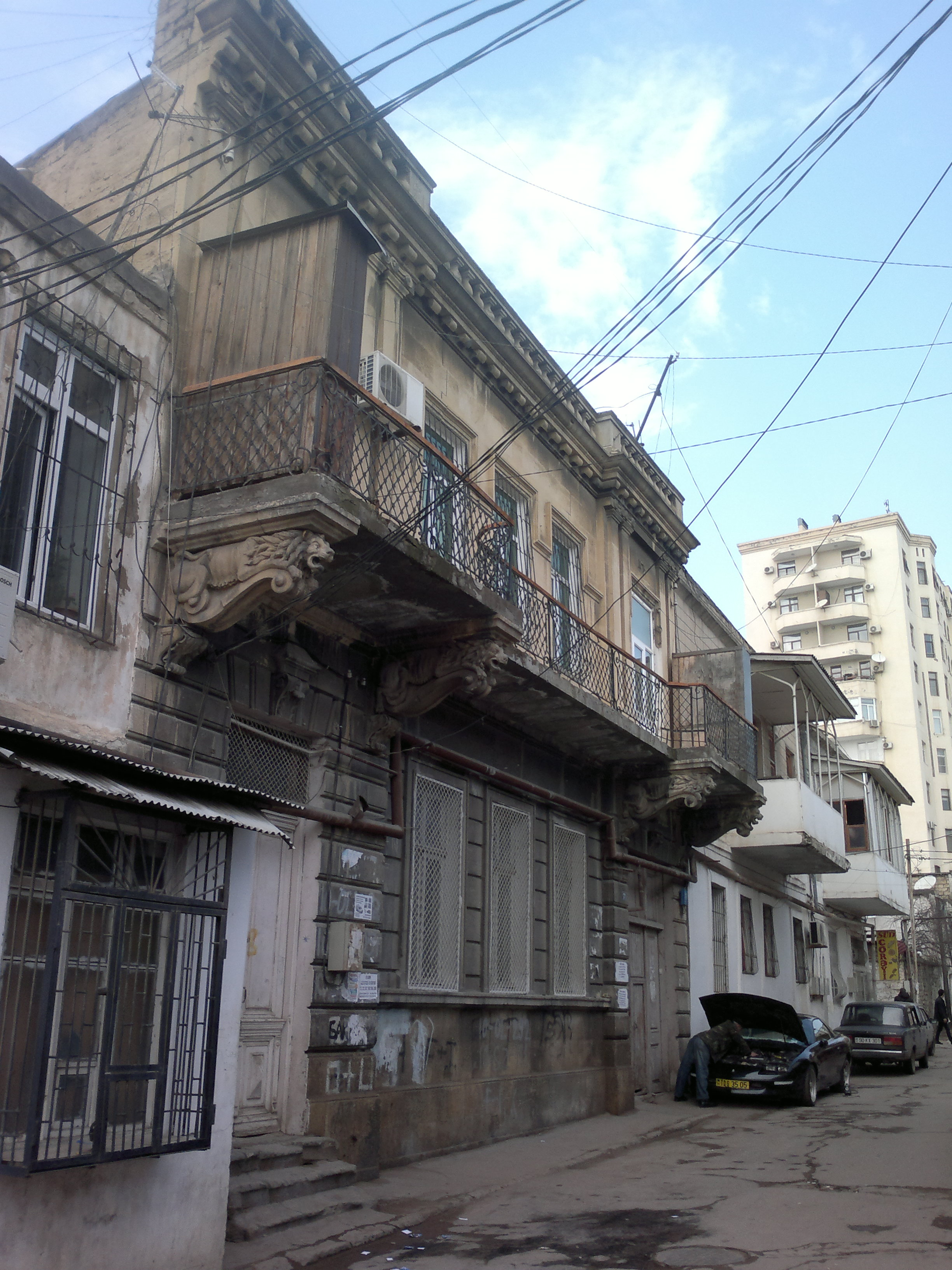
Nabat Ashurbayova Street, 171 (built in 1902)

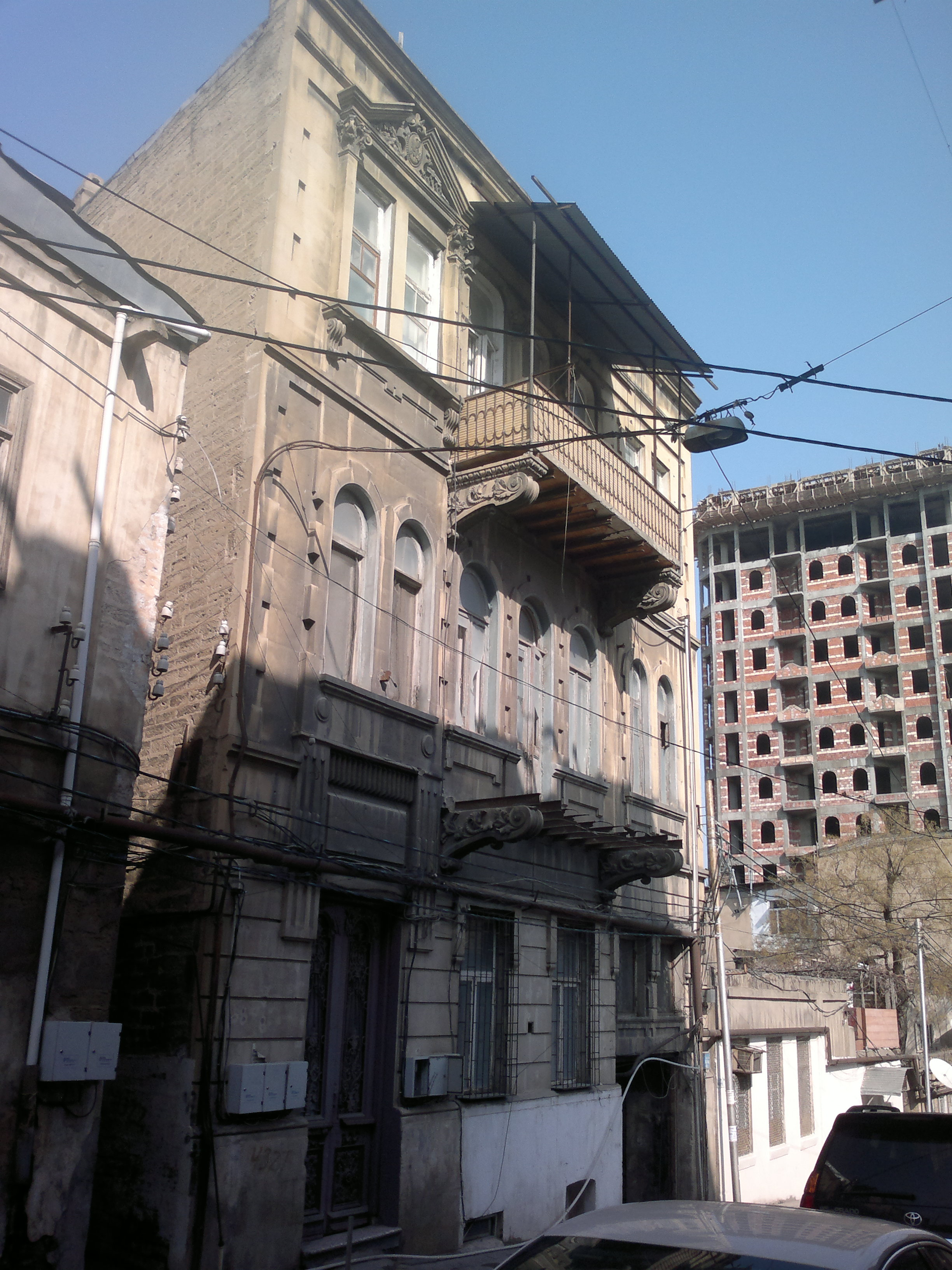
Bashir Safaroghlu Street, 105 (built in 1903)

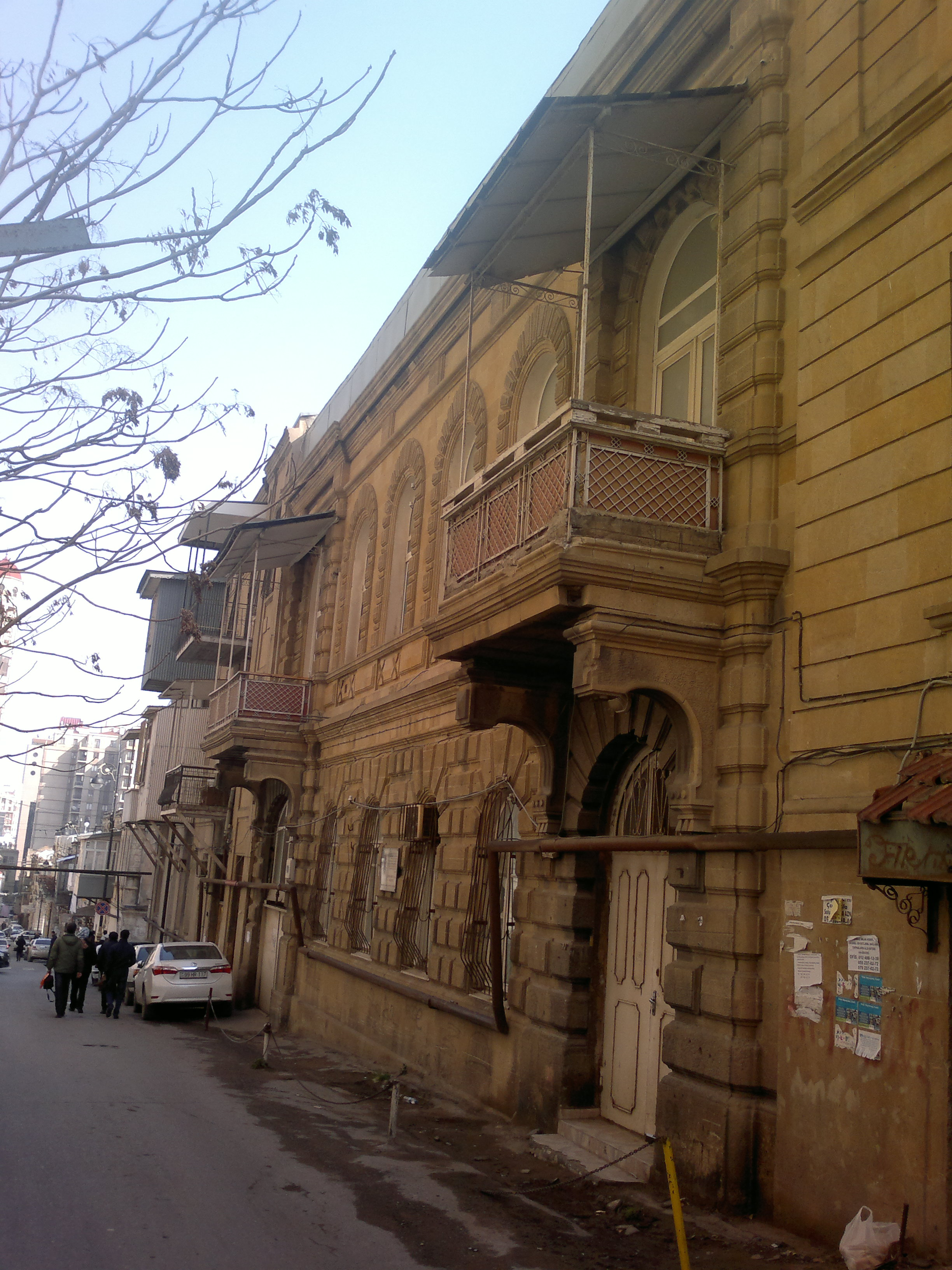
Suleyman Taghizade Street, 70 (built in 1893). Architect Józef Gosławski

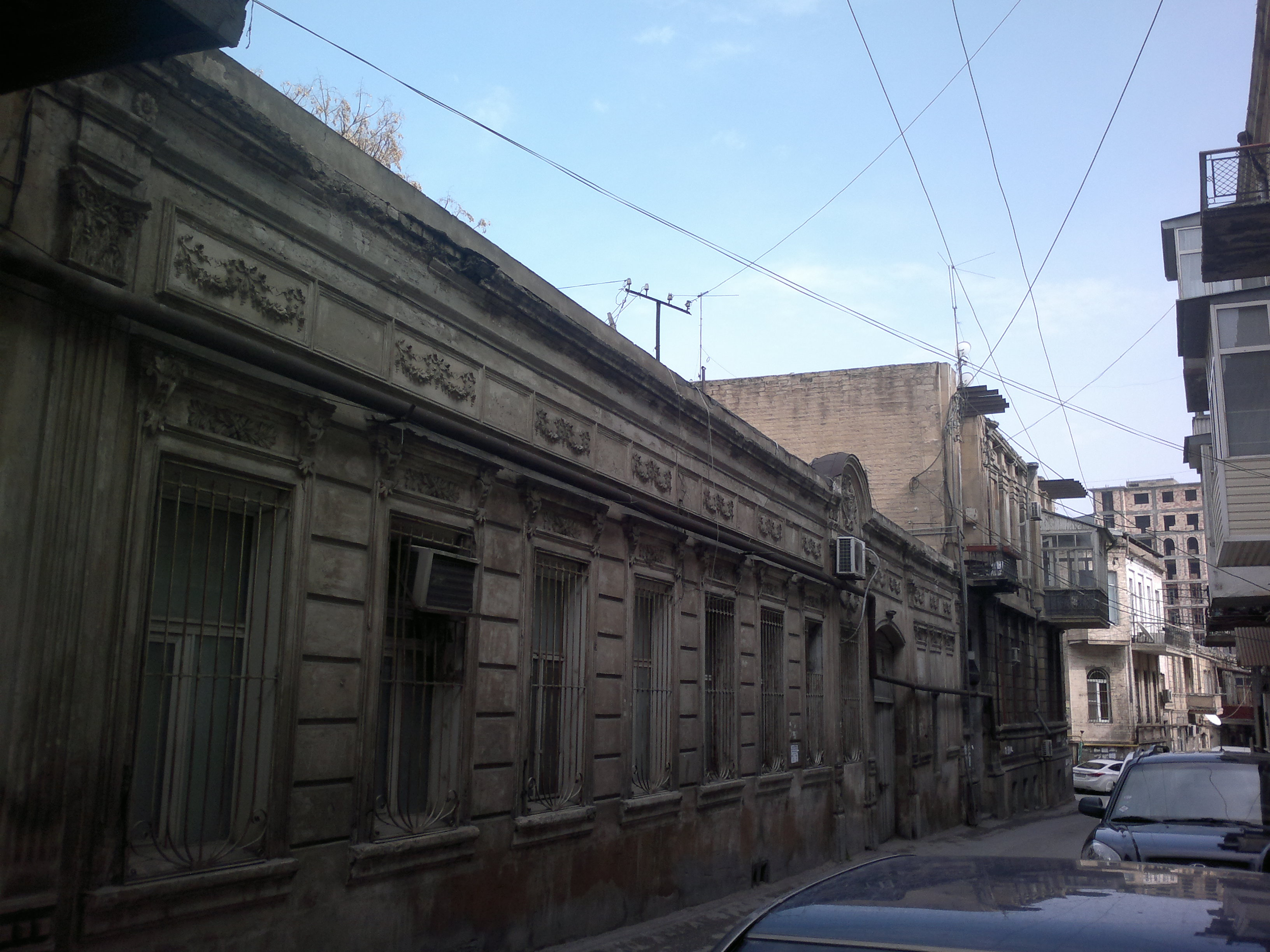
Suleyman Taghizade Street, 43

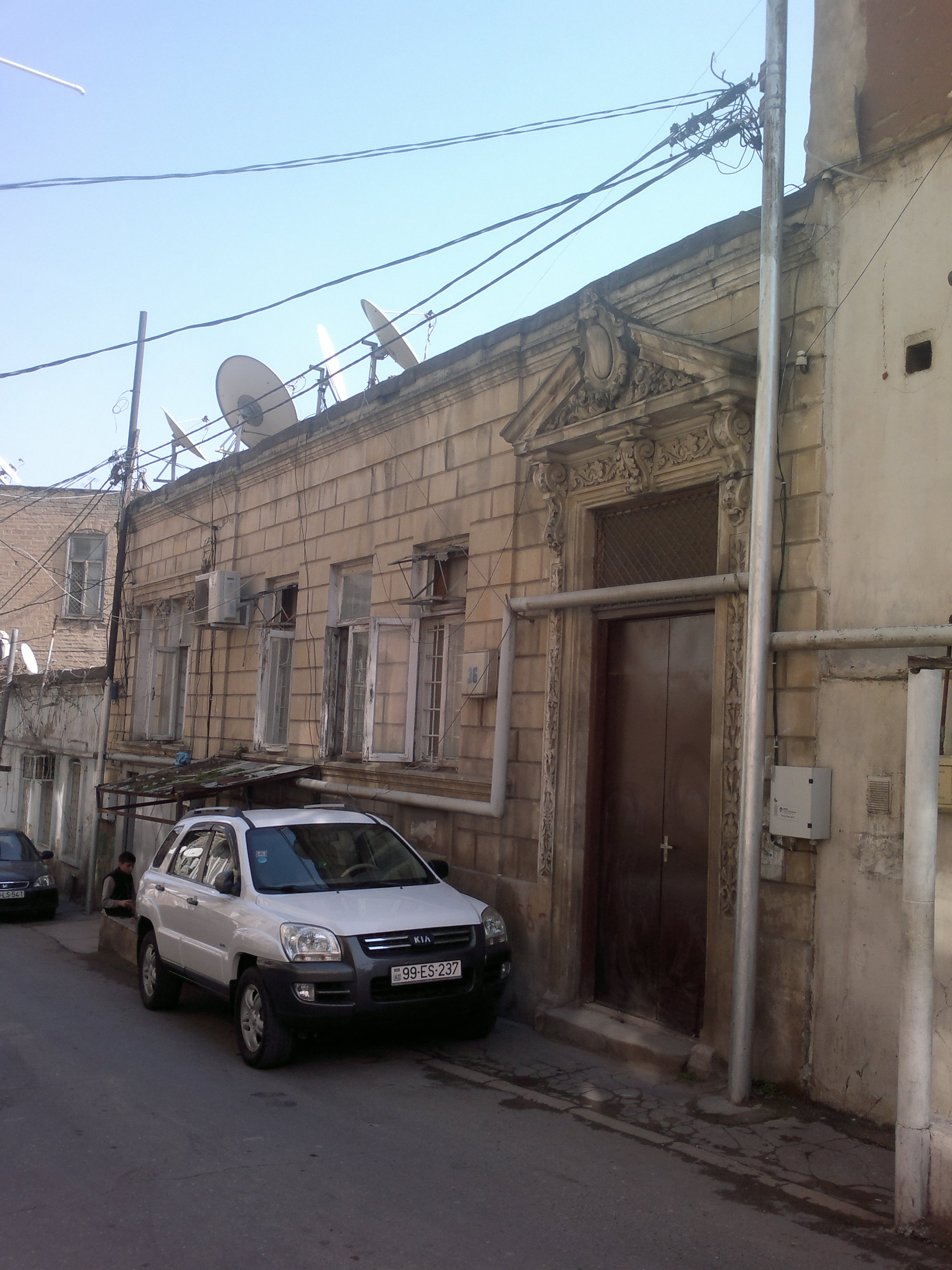
Aliovsət Guliyev Street, 36 (built in 1896)

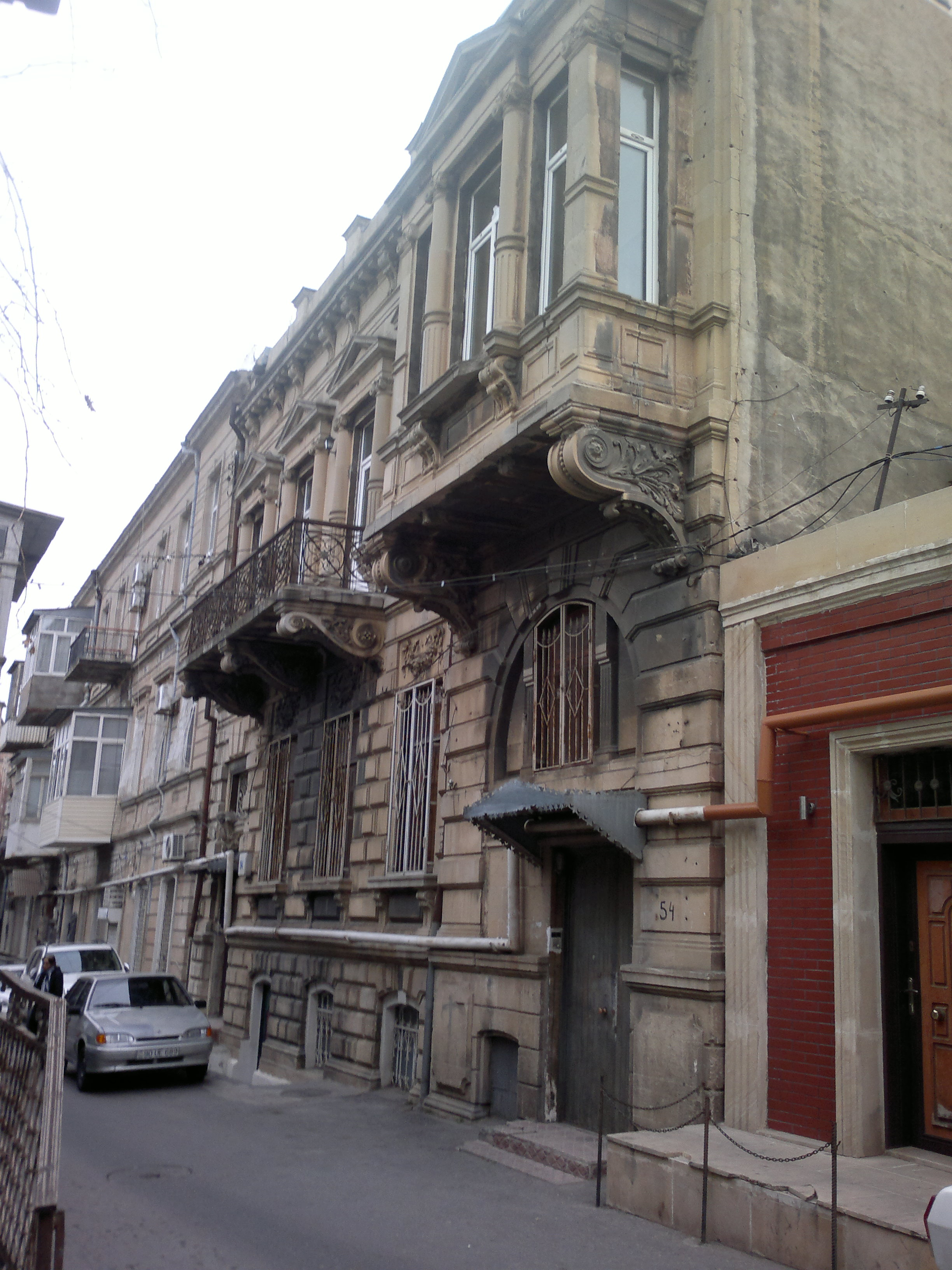
Suleyman Taghizade Street, 54 (built in 1909)

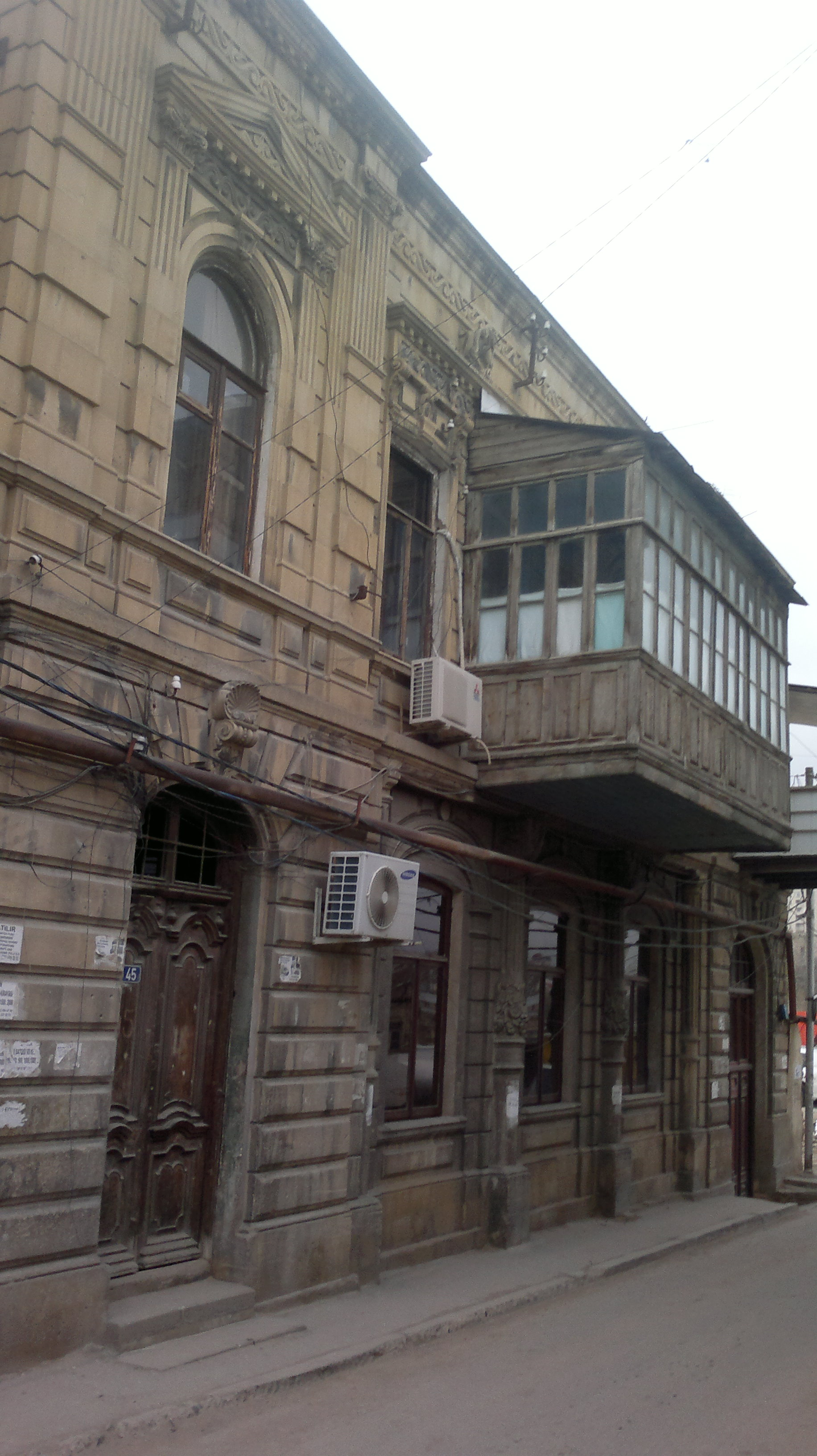
Mirza Fatali Street, 45 (built in 1909)

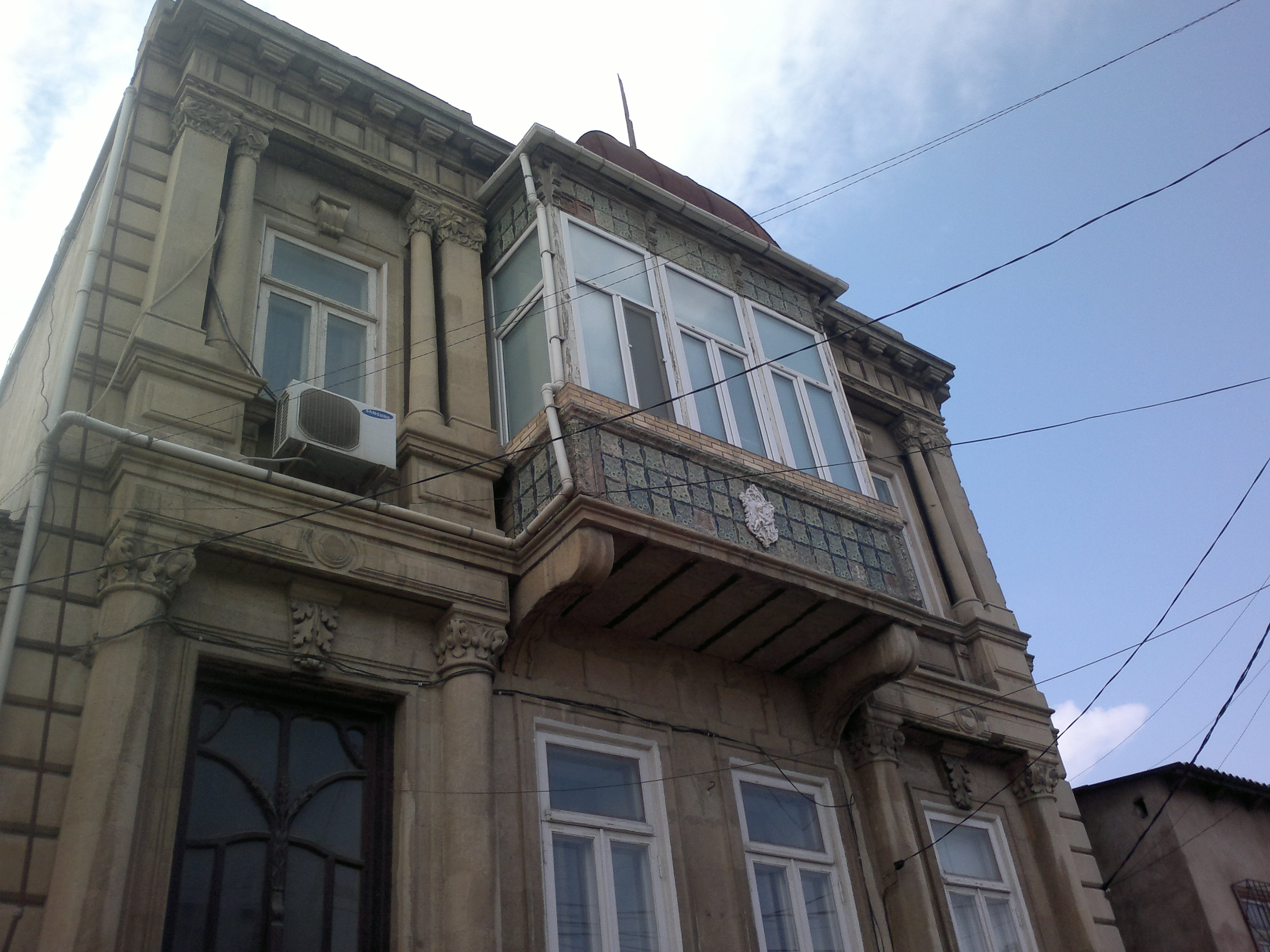
Nabat Ashurbayova Street, 121 (built in 1910). Architect Nikolai Bayev

=== Mosques ===
There are 7 mosques in Sovetsky: Shah Huseyn Mosque, Imam Hussein Mosque, Haji Javad Mosque, Taza Pir Mosque, Gasimbey Mosque and Fatimah Mosque. At the building of another Gasimbey Mosque with green dome different electricity and geology departments are located.

Haji Javad Mosque that is located on the cross of Abdulla Shaig Street 79 and Chingiz Mustafayev Street 20 was built in 1305 of hijra calendar.

There is also Haji Abdulrahimbey Gulubeyov Mosque on Nabat Ashurbayova Street 63 is also protected by state. But this building is not functioning as a mosque. It is a building of Standardization, Metrology and Patents Committee of the Science and Engineering Library Depository.

Historical mosques in Sovetsky

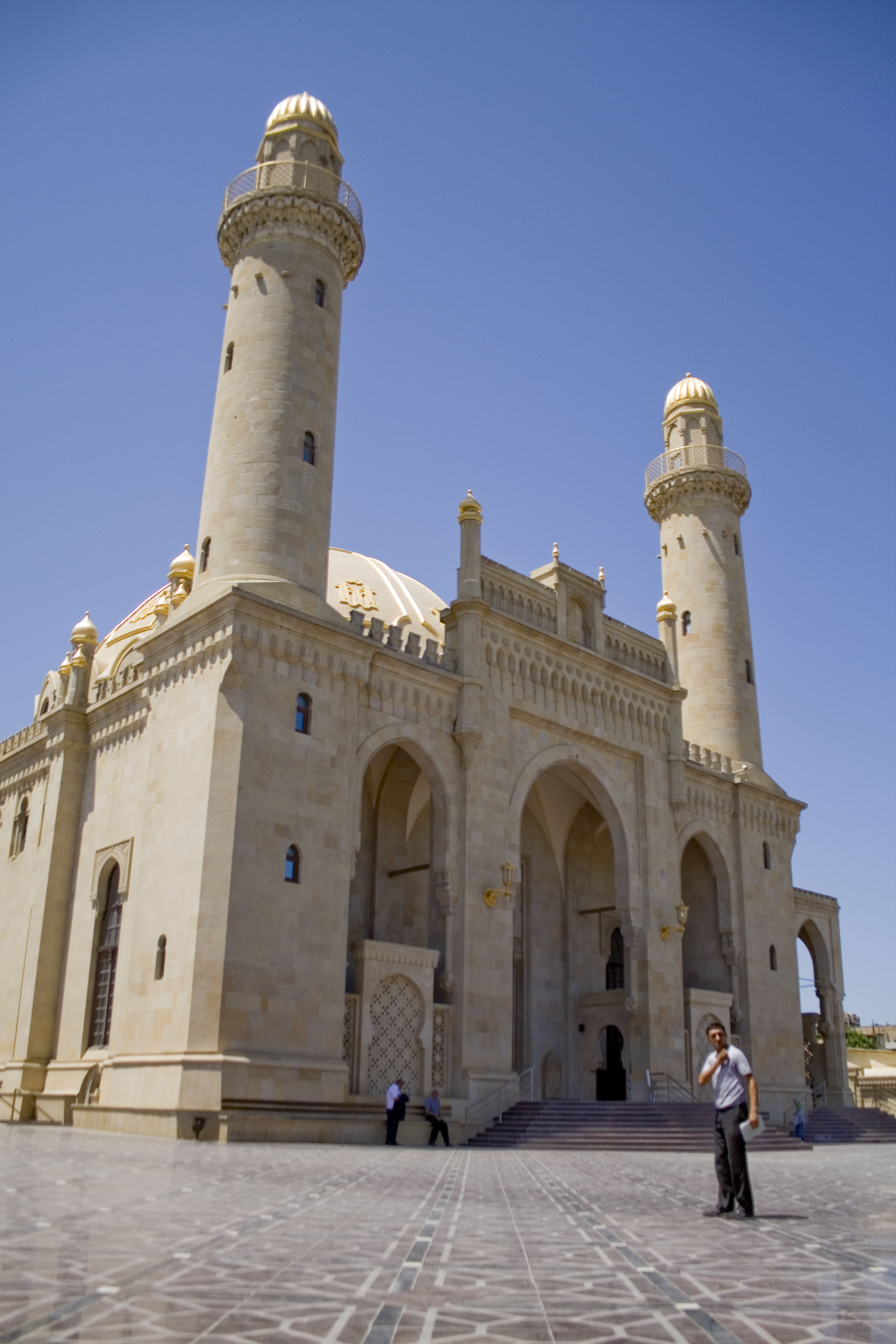
Taza Pir Mosque. Mirza Fatali Street (built in 1905—1915). Architect Zivar bey Ahmadbeyov

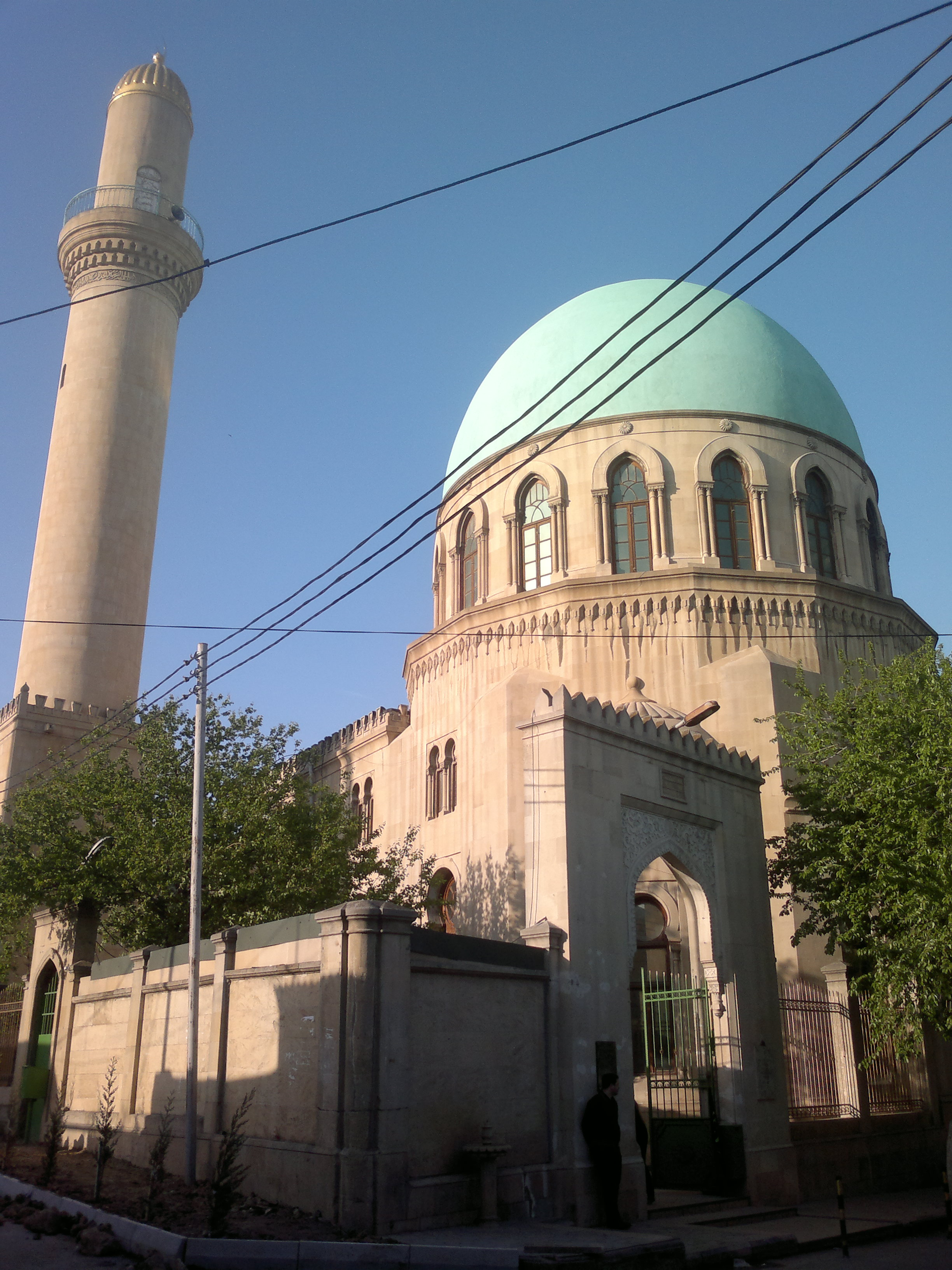
Haji Sultan Ali Mosque. Salatin Asgarova Street, 75 (built in 1910). Architect Józef Płoszko

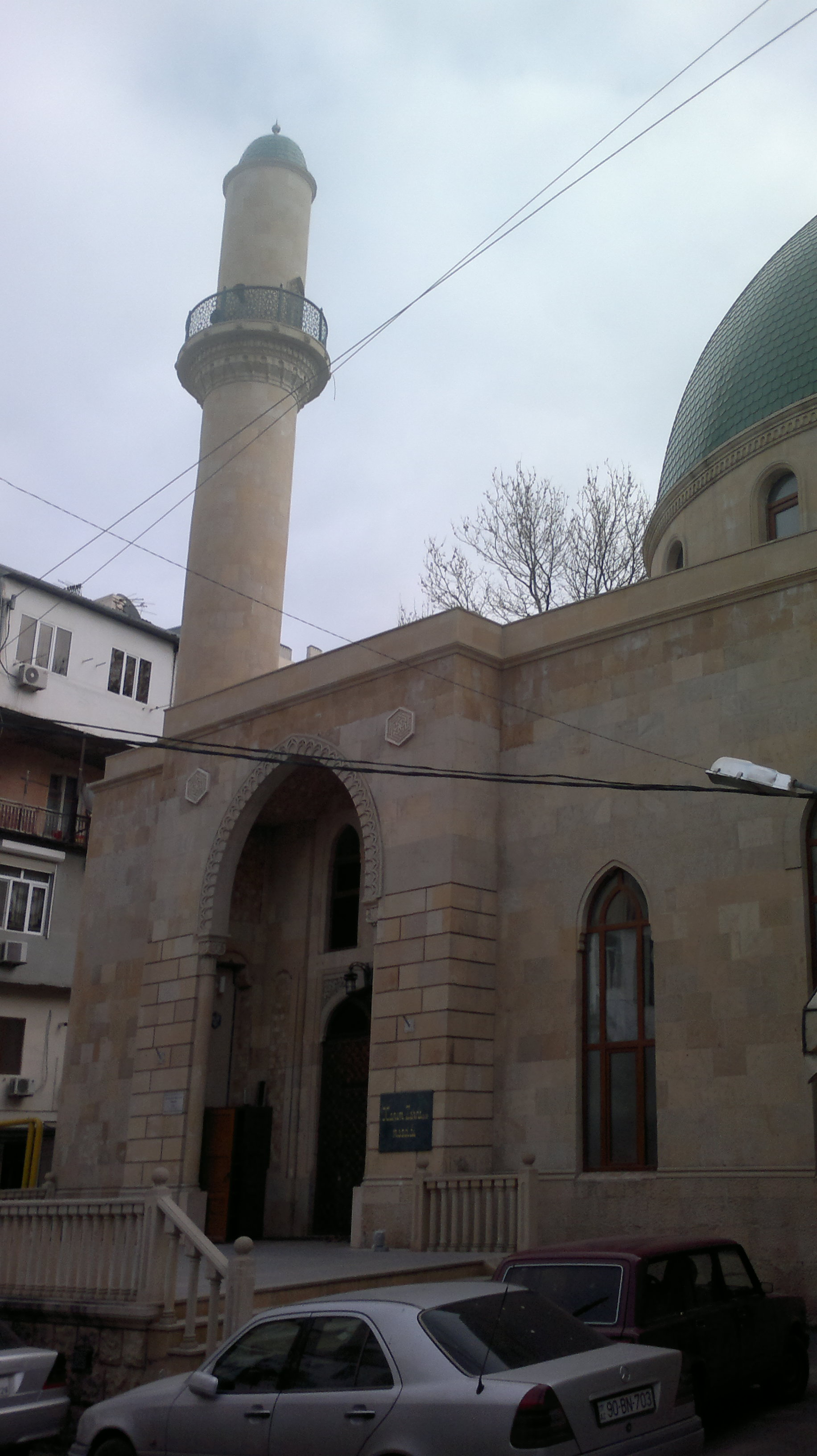
Fatimah Mosque. Cross of Chingiz Mustafayev Street, 90 and Husu Hajiyev (built in early 20th c.)
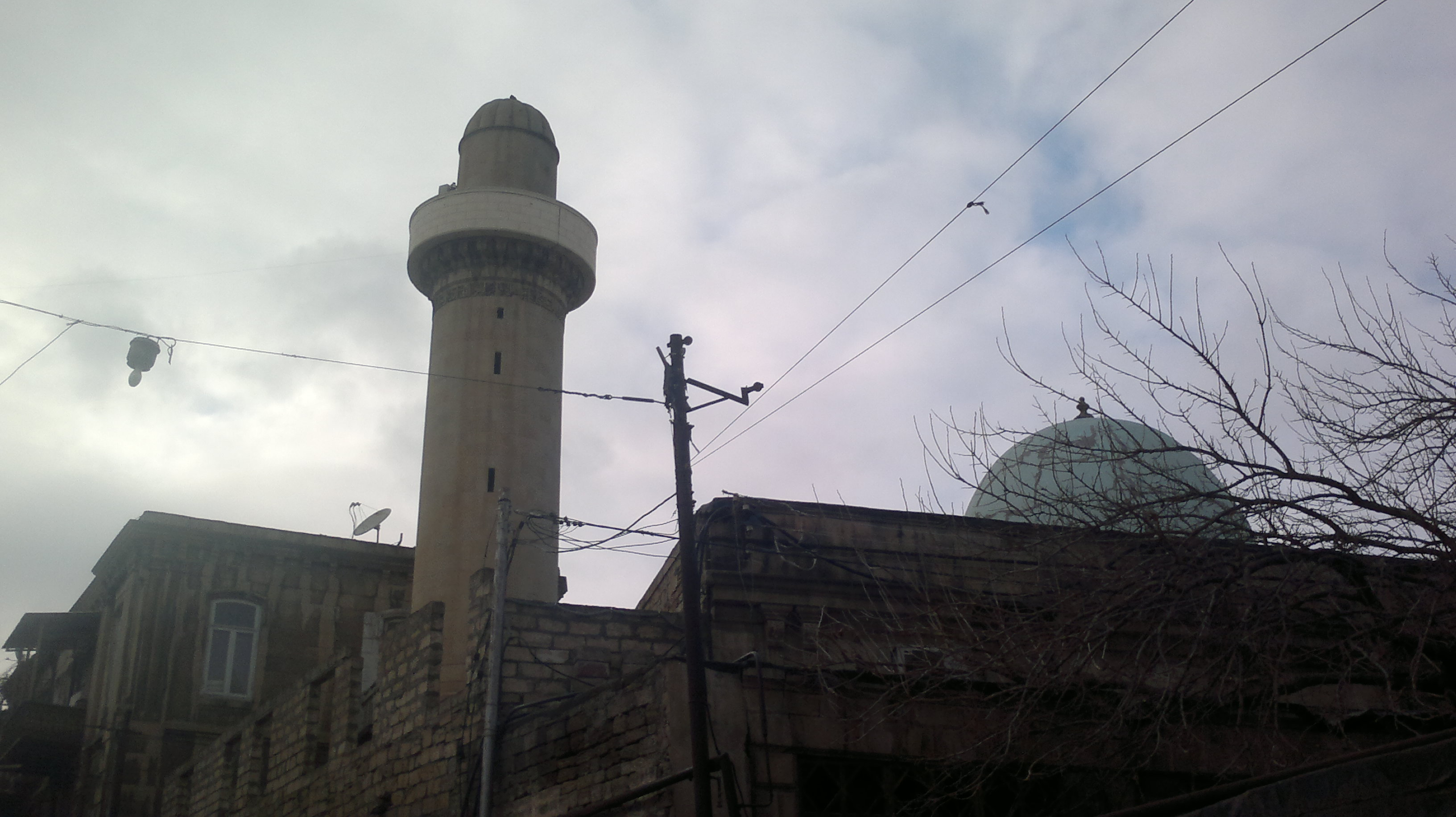
Gasimbey Mosque. Crossing of Hazi Aslanov Street, 90 and Husu Hajiyev Street (built in early 20th c.). Architect Mirza Gafar Ismayilov

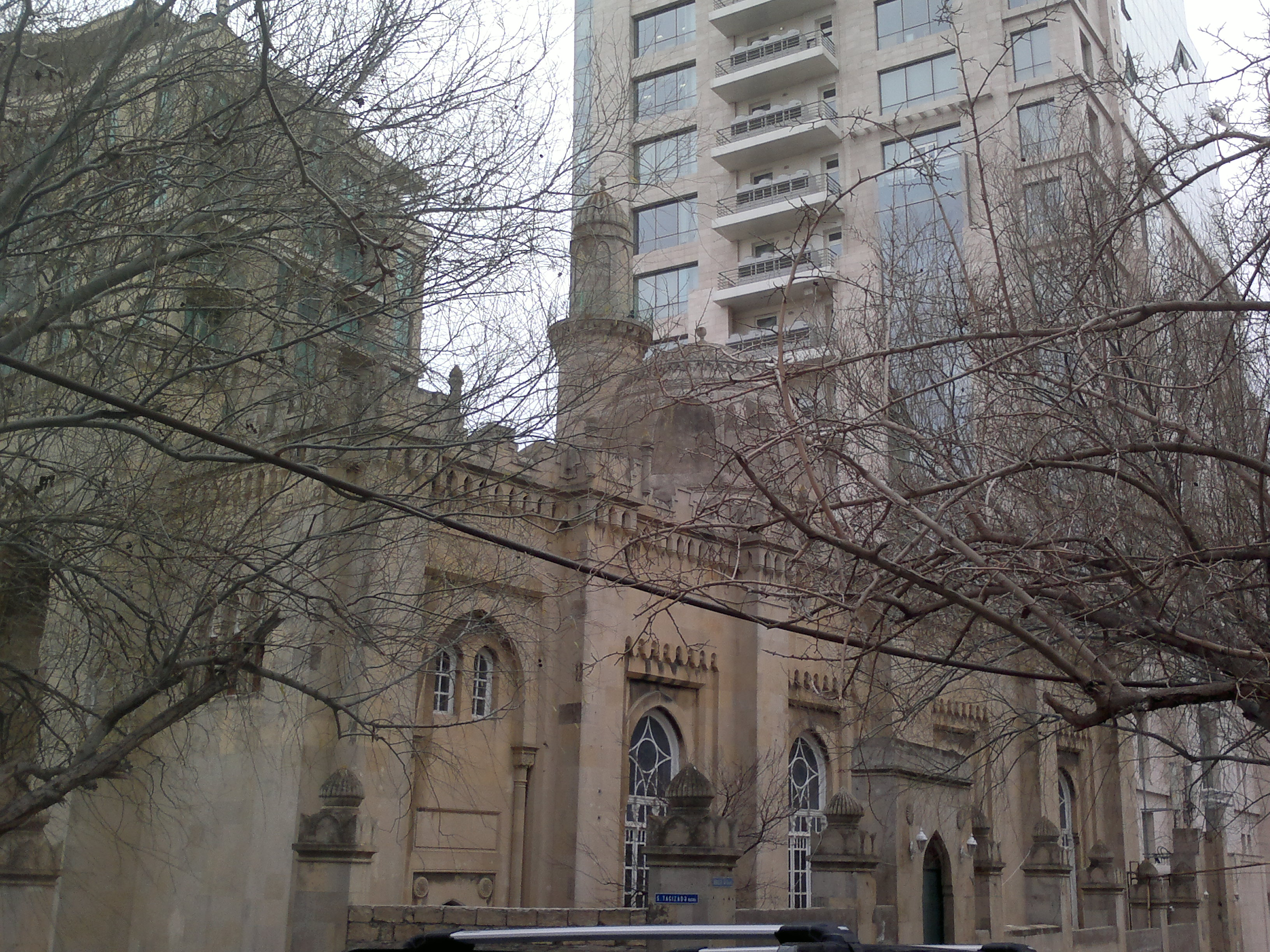
Imam Hussein Mosque (formerly Ashumov Mosque). Abdulla Shaig Street, 14 (built in 1896). Architect Adolf Eichler

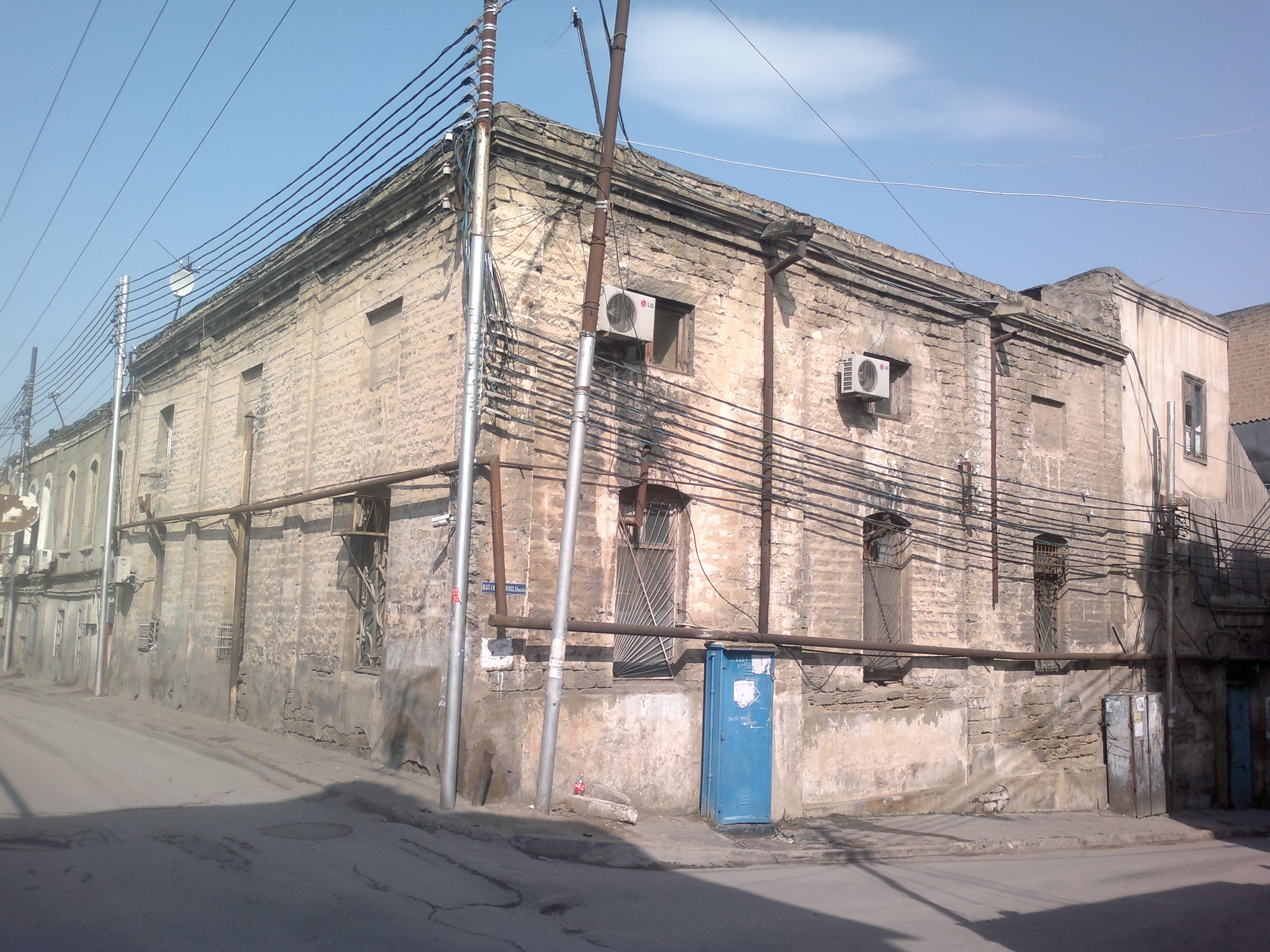
Gasimbey Mosque. Bashir Safaroghlu Street, 103 (built in 1897)

=== Baths ===
The buildings of the bath at Murtuza Mukhtarov Street 41 was built in 19th century. There is a desk on the facade with says that this bath is protected by state.

"Shor hammam" bath at Mirza Fatali Street 105 was built in 1889. It is not function now. According to residents the neighbouring house was belonged to one official who restored the facade of the bath. But when thi man sold his house the restoration of the bath was stopped.

"Akhund hammam" bath at Murtuza Mukhtarov Street 141 was built in 1885. The building of this bath was restored by Turkish architects and functions as a bath since 2013.

The building of Azerbaijan State Yugh Theater that is located at Murtuza Mukhtarov Street 83 was also a building of the bath and was built in 1885 by Haji Farajulla.

Historical baths in Sovetsky

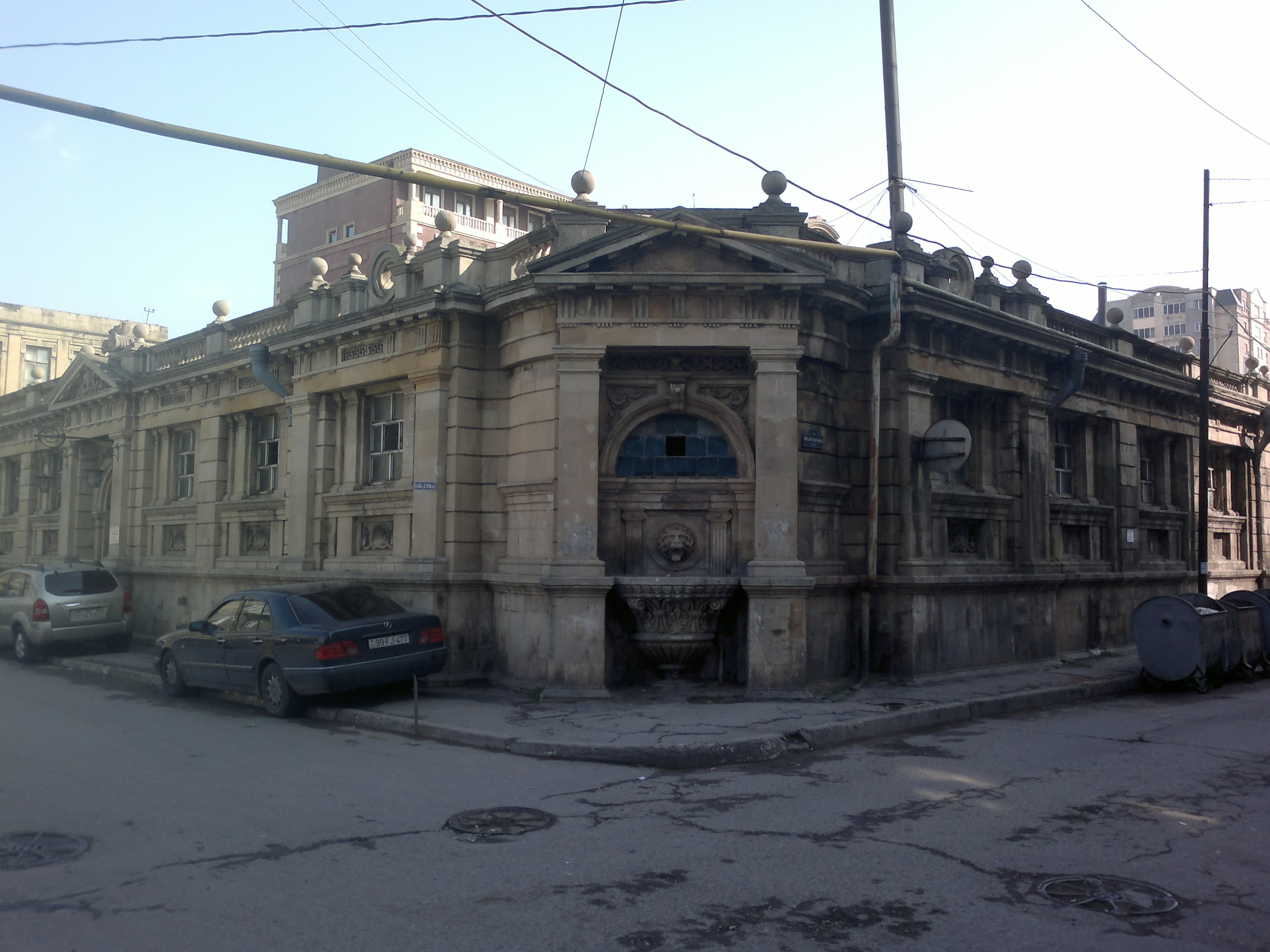
“Fantasy” bath. Chingiz Mustafayev Street, 114 (built in 1886)

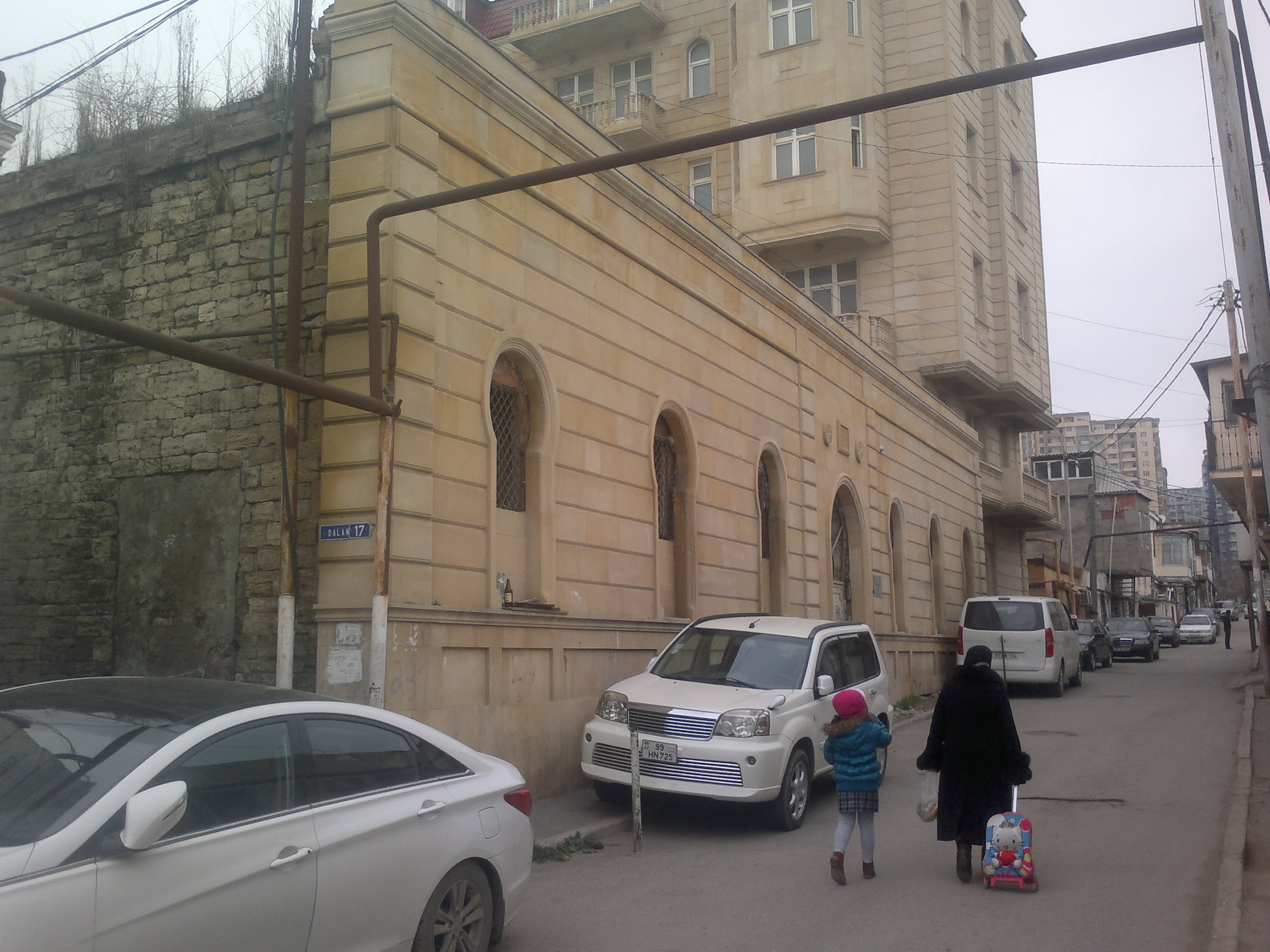
"Shor hammam" (bath № 12). Mirzə Fətəli Street, 105 (built in 1889)

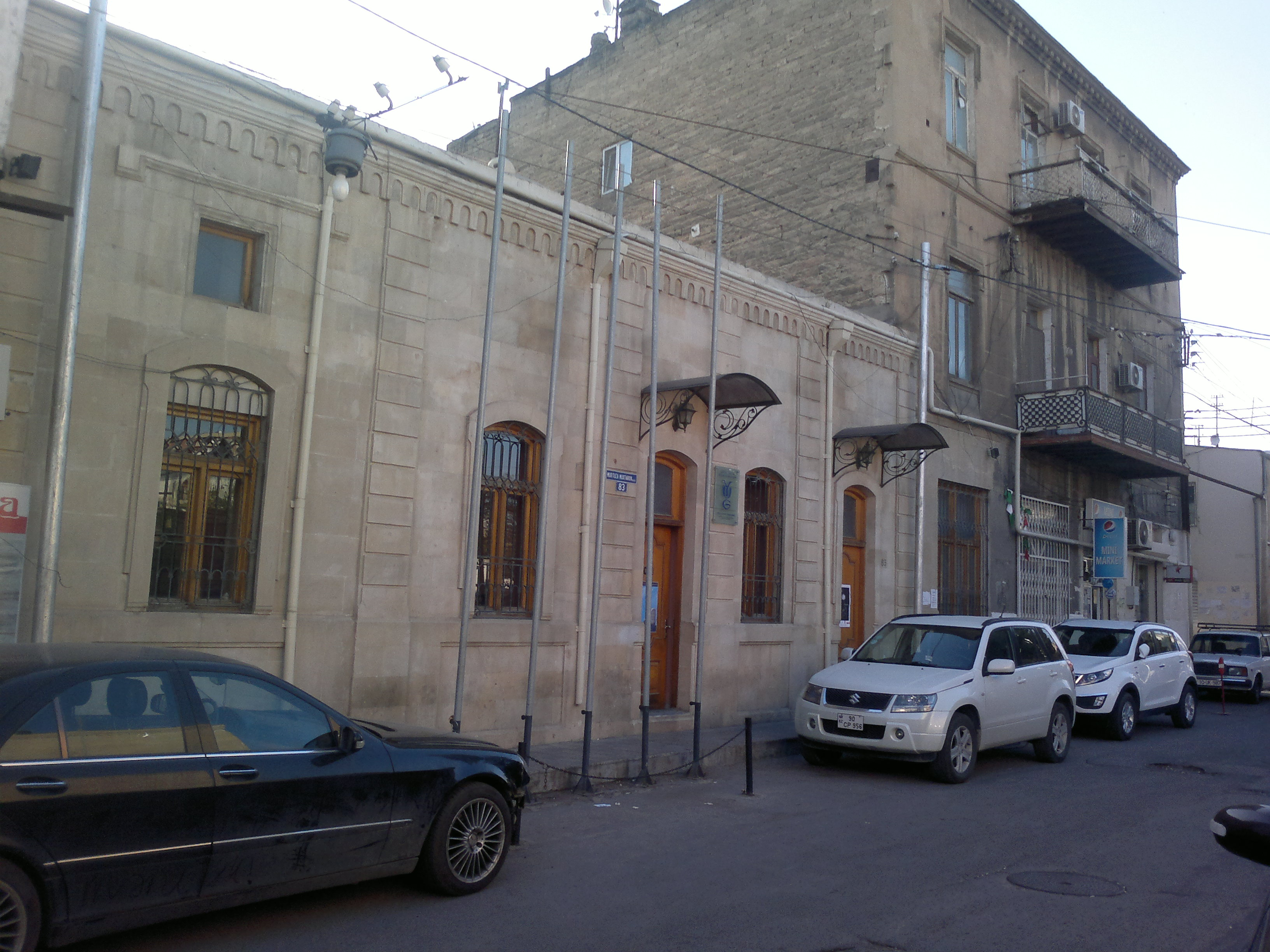
Building of Azerbaijan State Yugh Theater (former bath). Murtuza Muxtarov Street, 83 (built in 1888)

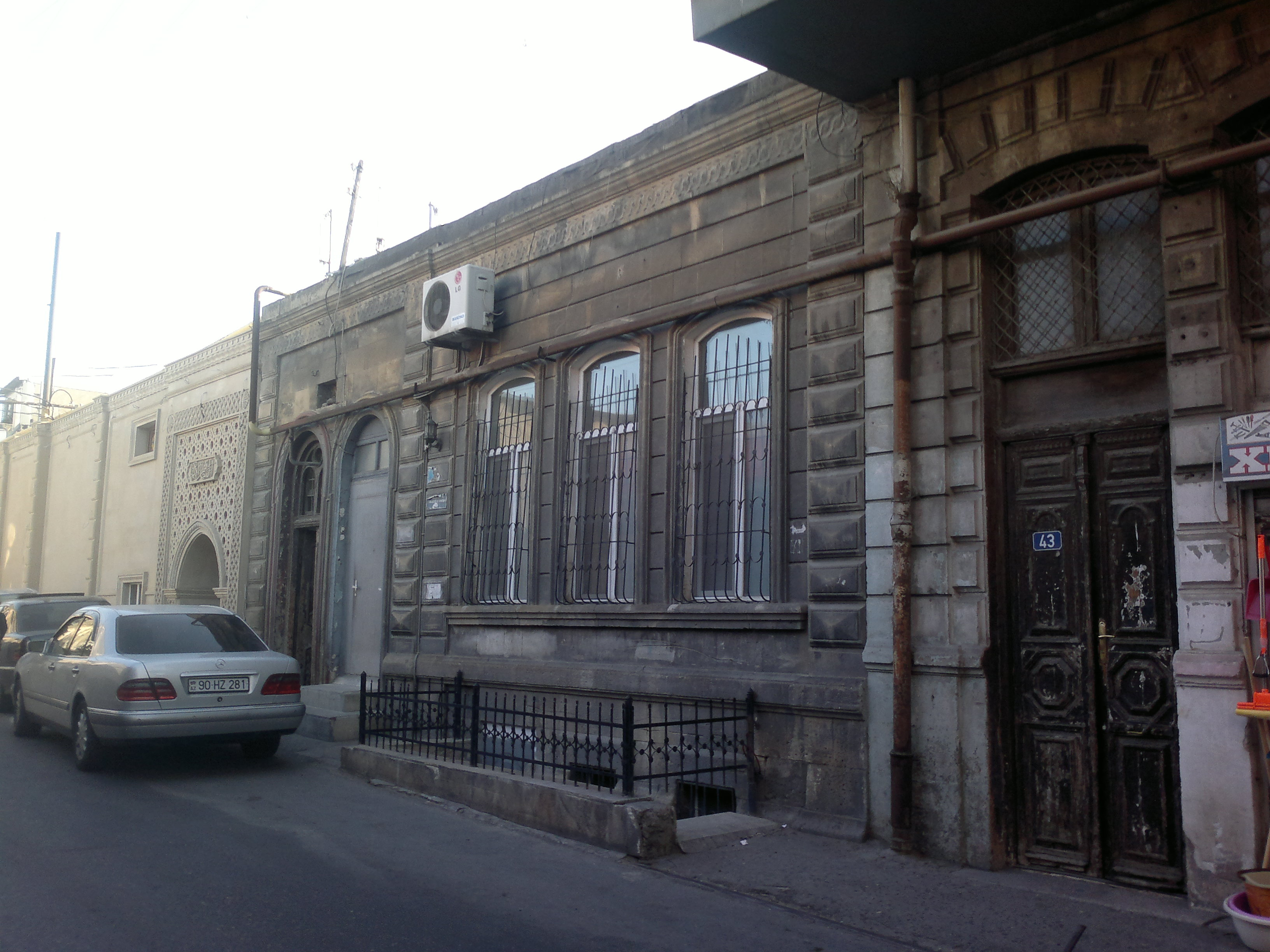
Murtuza Muxtarov Street, 41 (built in 19th-early 20th cc.)

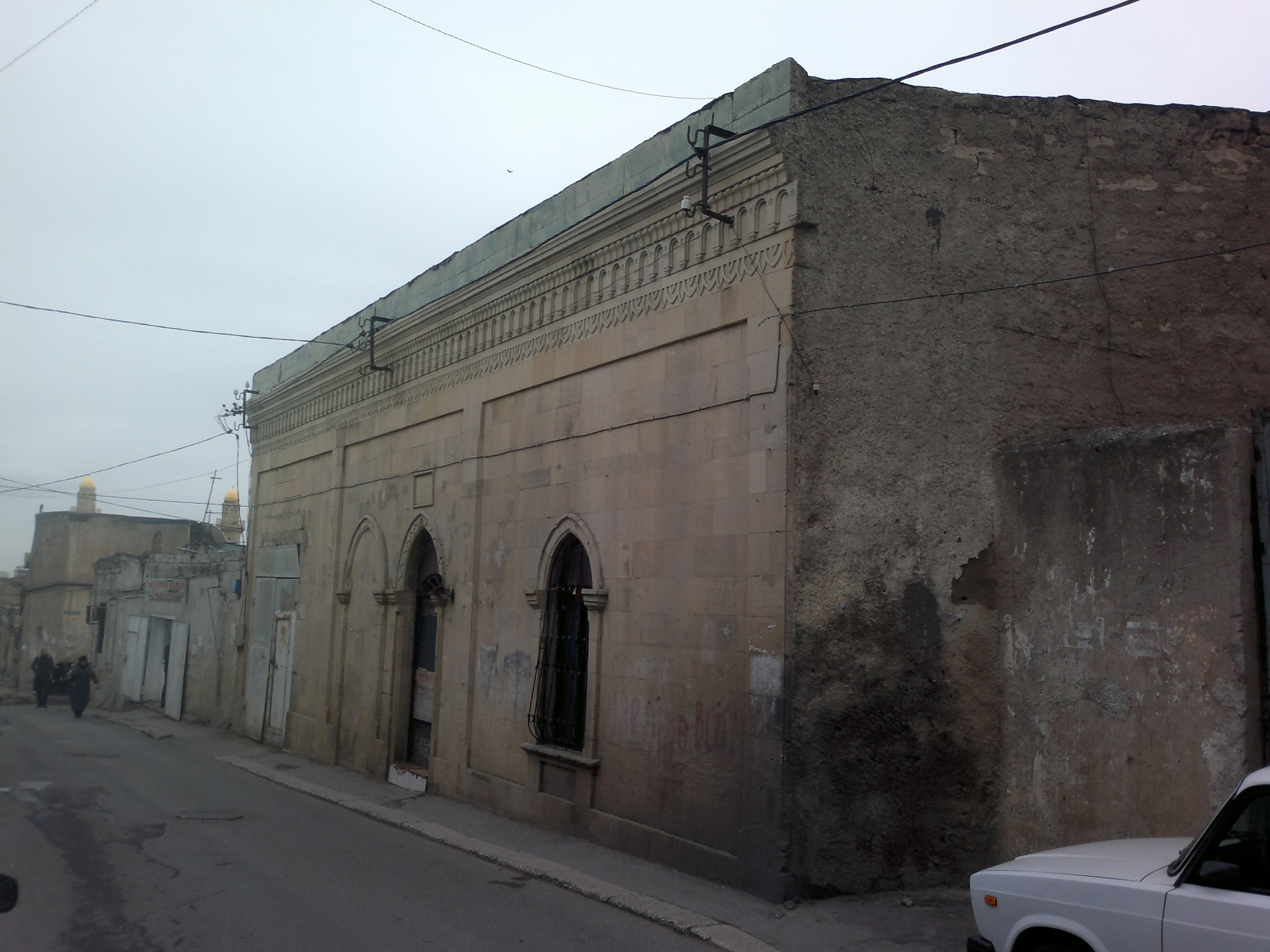
Bashir Safaroghlu Street, 36 (built in 19th century)

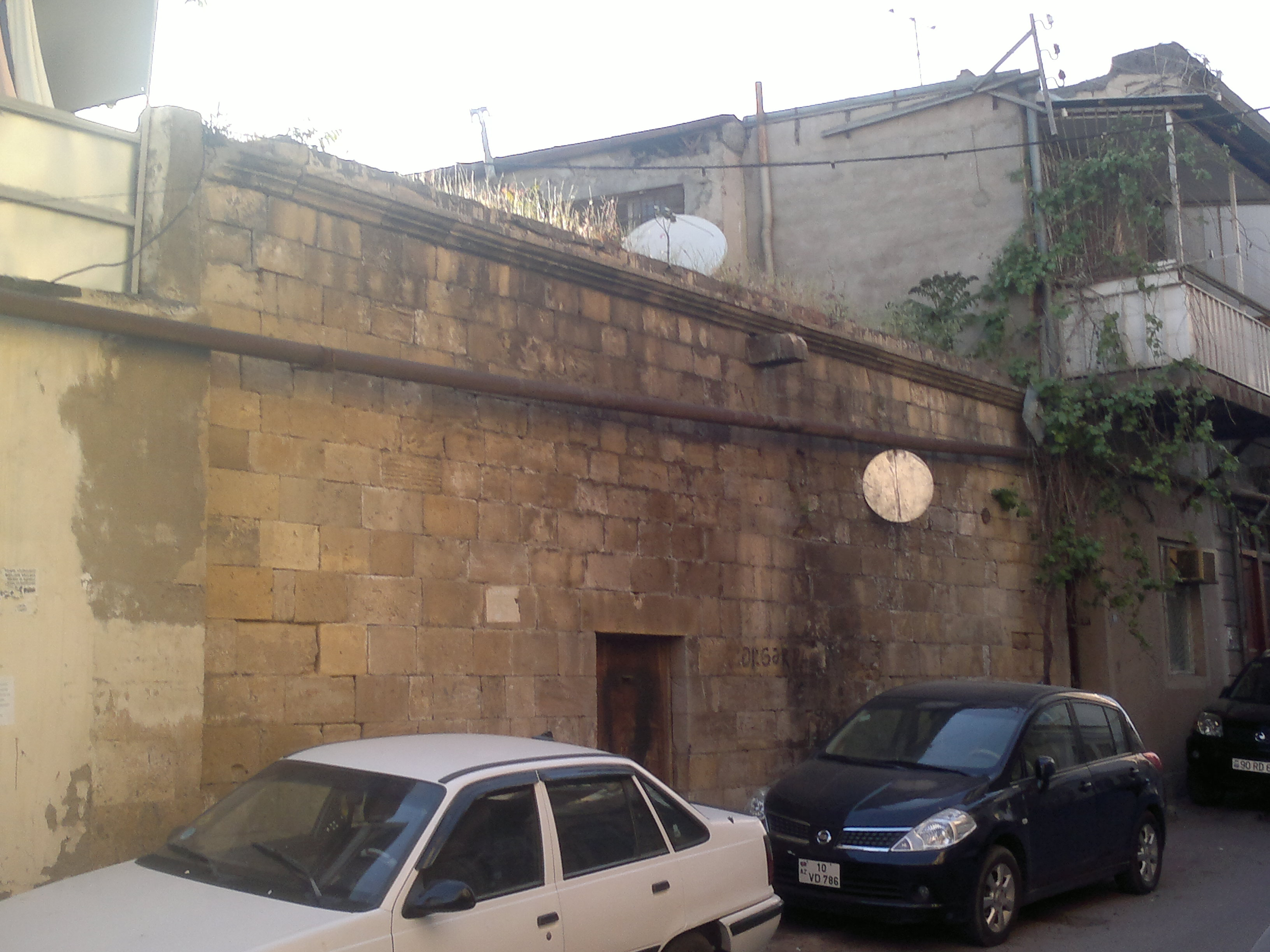
Zargarpalan Street, 87 (built in 1899)

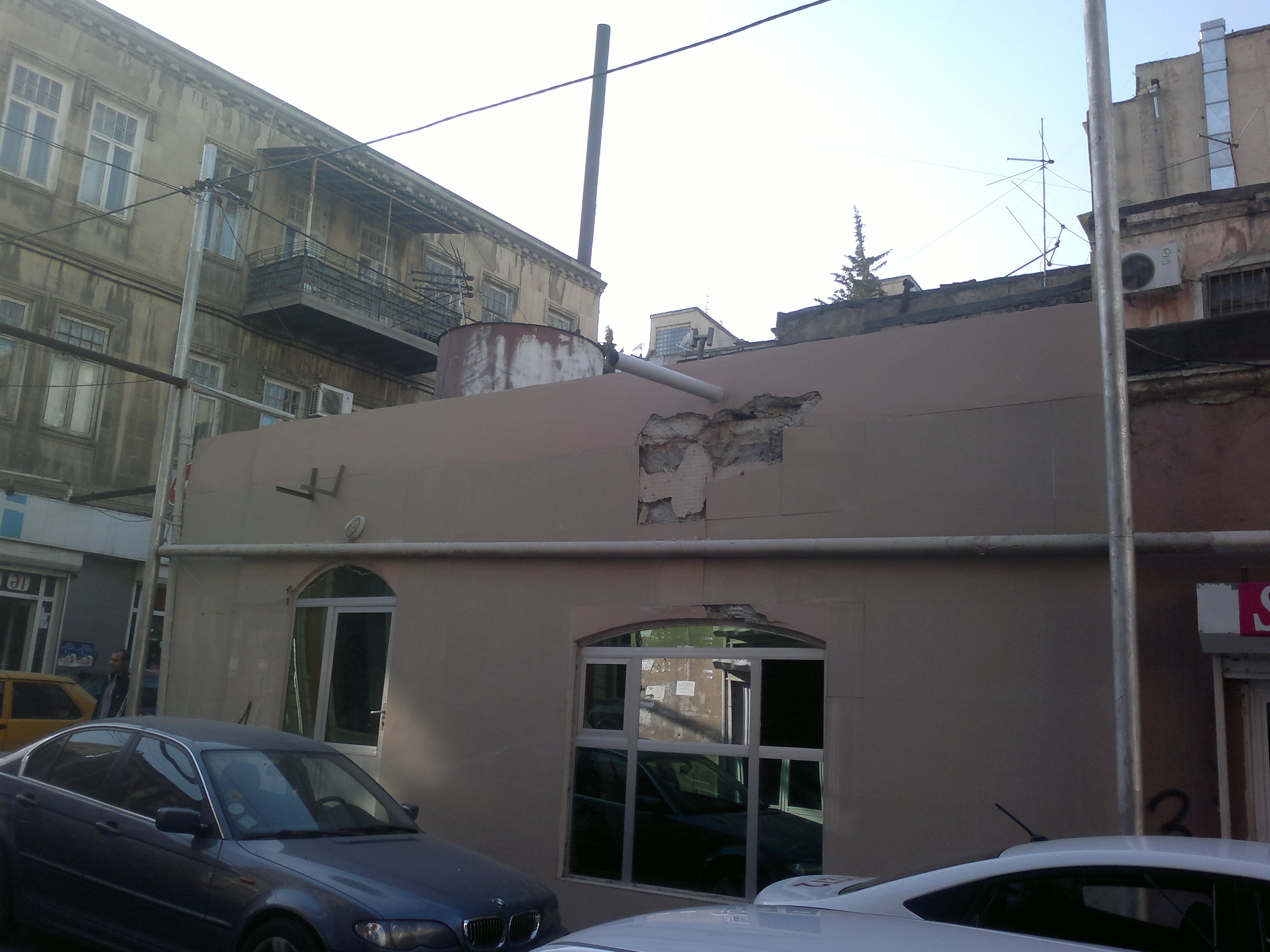
Zargarpalan Street, 48 (built in 1886)

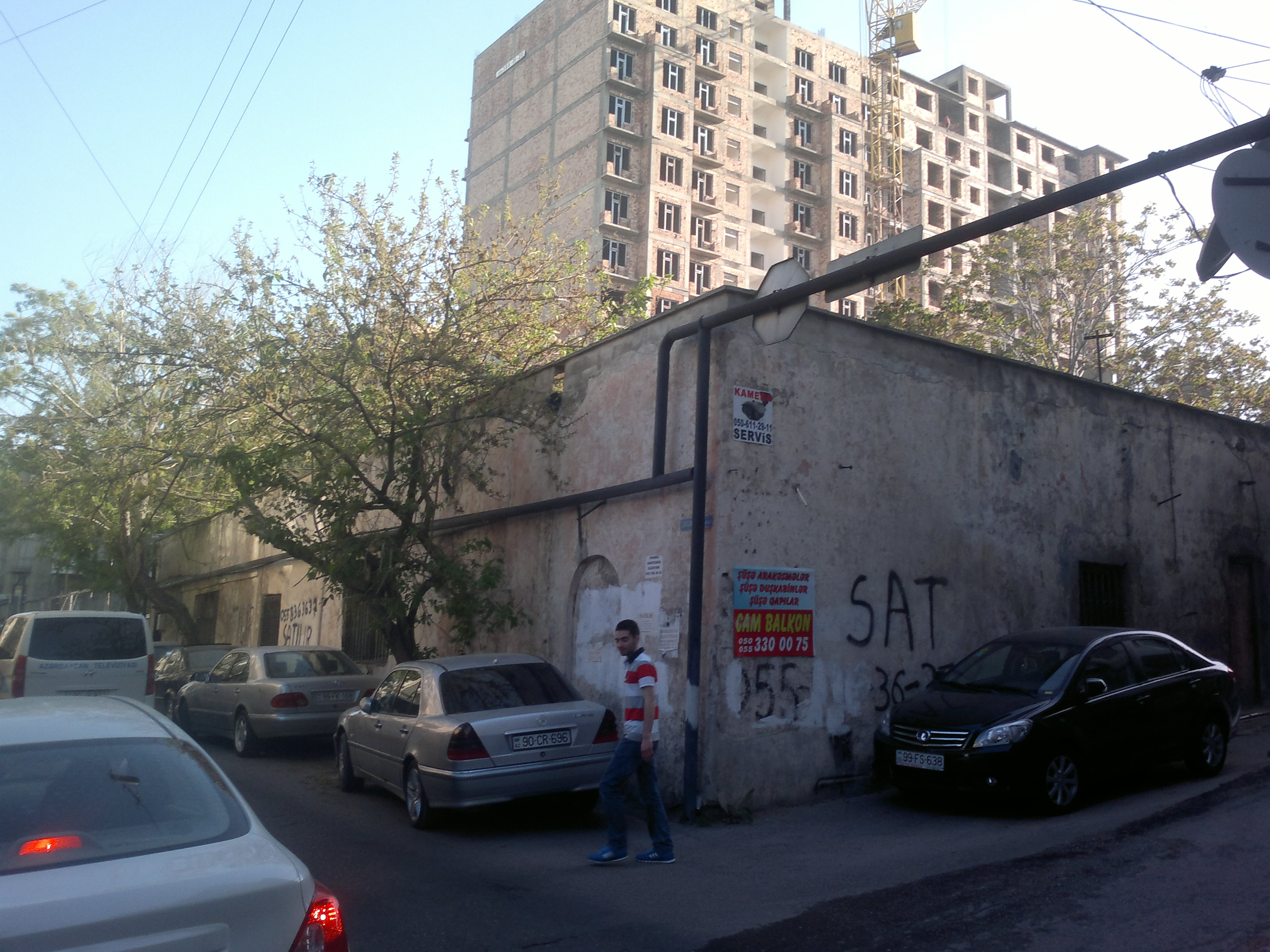
Bath of Hajigurban Ashurov. Zargarpalan Street, 19 (built in 1886)

=== Shollar water towers ===
There are three water towers in Sovetsky. According to residents these monuments were taken under state control. These towers were built in the 19th century due to construction of Shollar water pipeline. Each of these towers supplied the local residents with Shollar water. These towers functioned until 1950s.

Shollar water towers in Sovetsky (built in the 19th century)

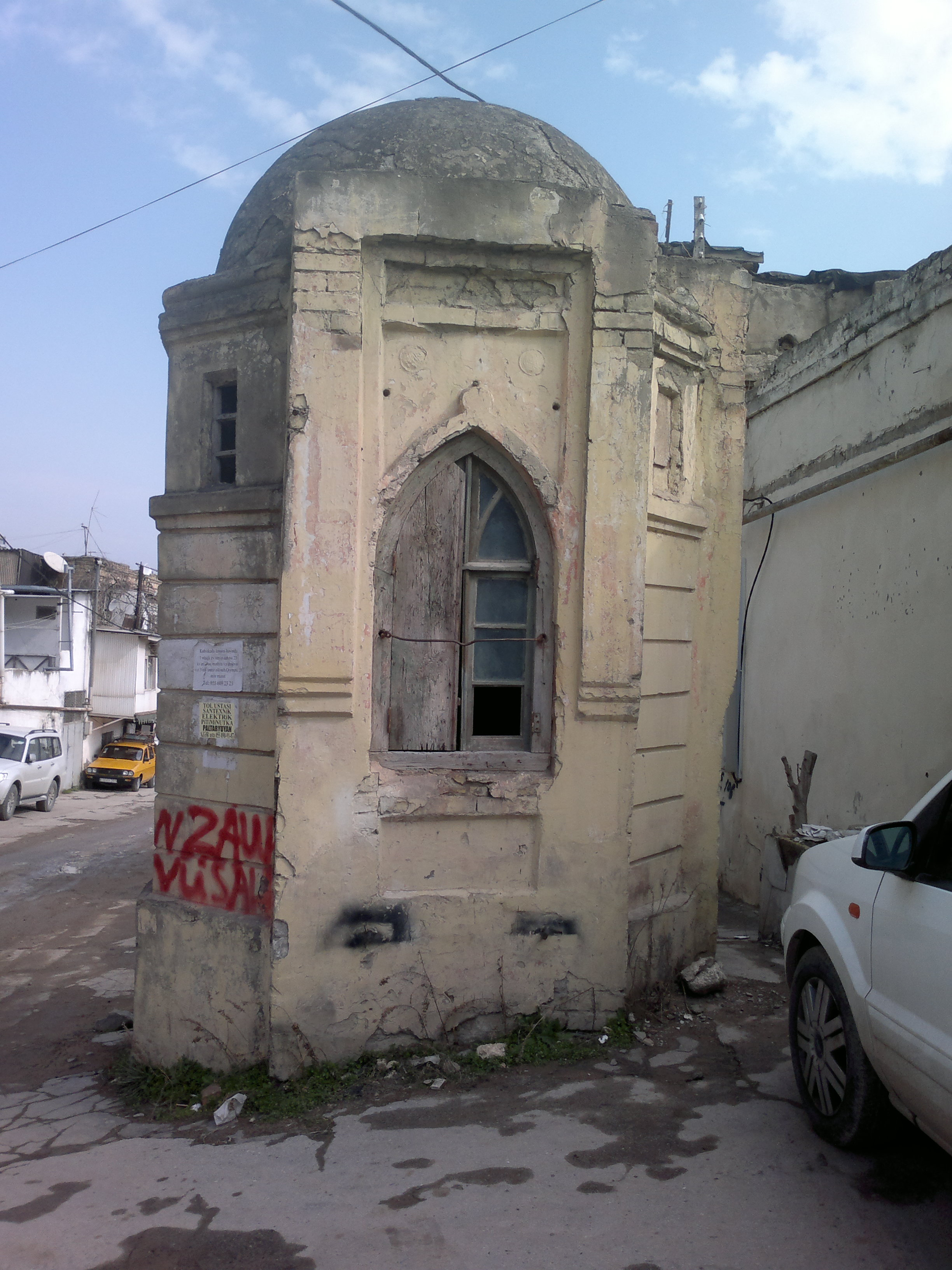
Cross of Suleyman Rahimov and Abdulla Shaig streets

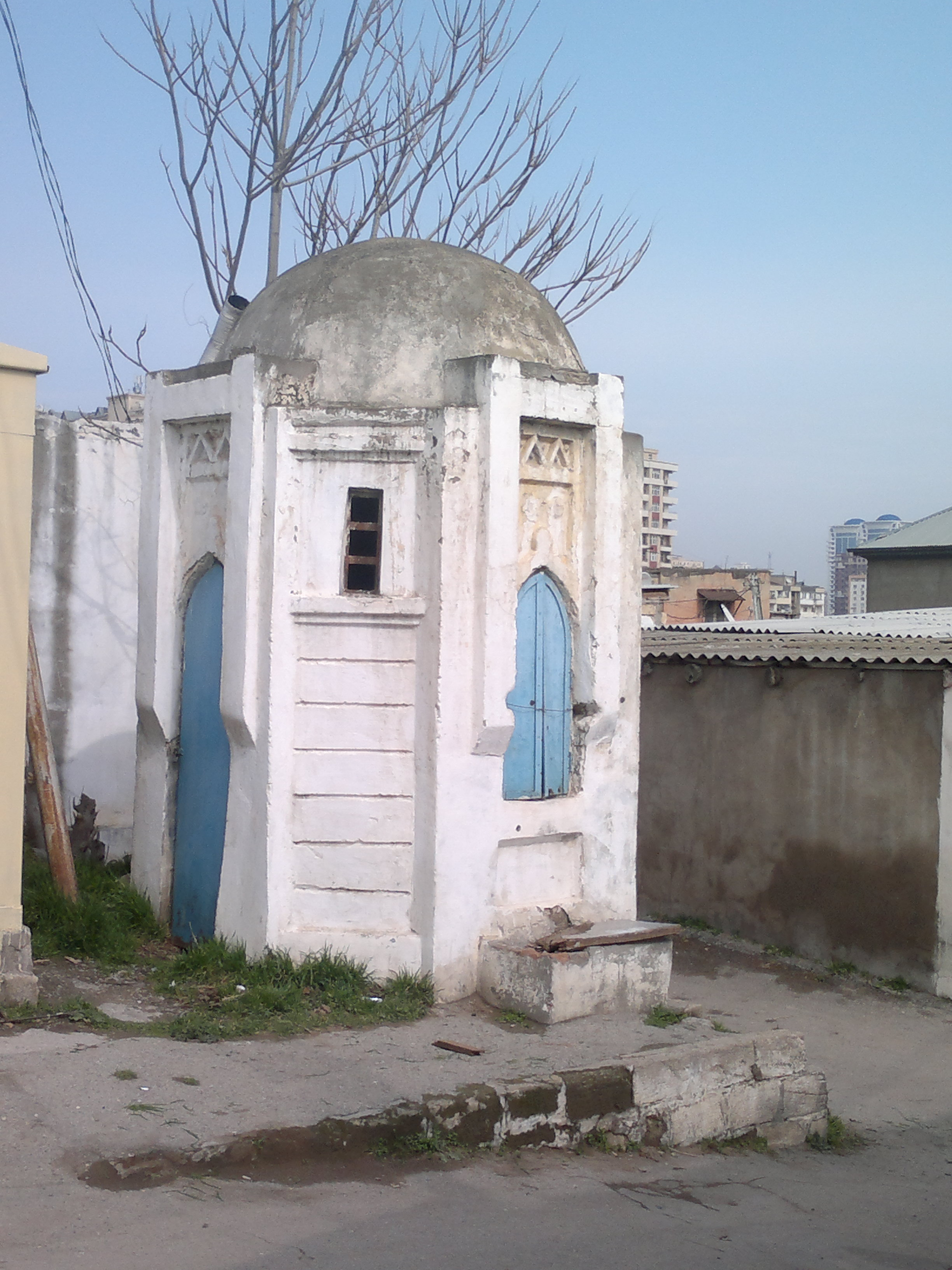
Cross of Salatin Asgarova and Abdulla Shaig streets

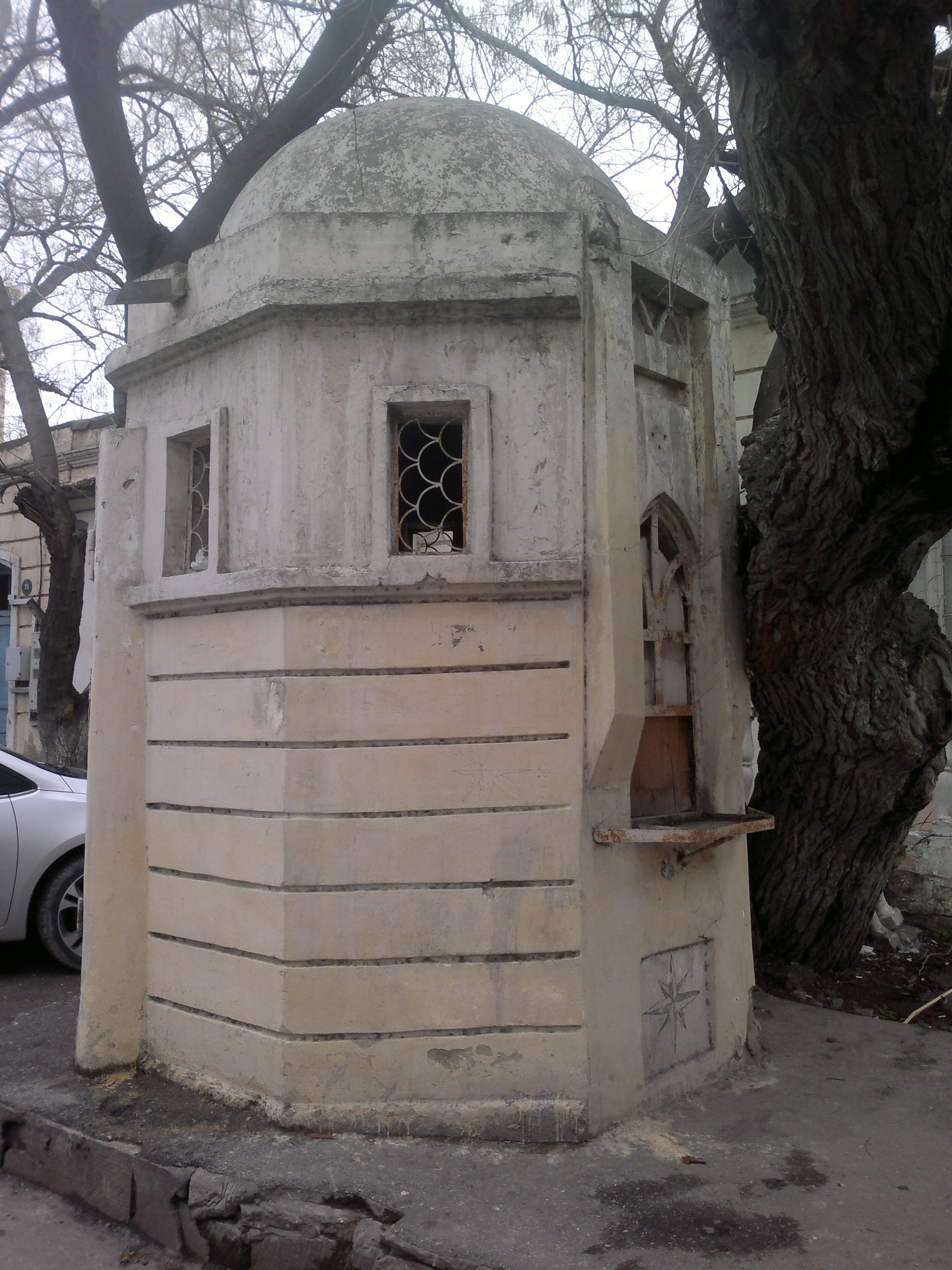
Cross of Shamil Azizbeyov and Rasul Rza streets
