= Reservoirs of Azerbaijan =

The climate in most parts of Azerbaijan is semi-arid. In order to expand the areas of irrigation in a dry climate and to provide grape and orchards with water, many small and large reservoirs (reservoirs, water intakes, water tanks) have been created. There are 140 reservoirs in the country. The total volume of reservoirs is 21.5 km^{3}. Most reservoirs are regulated and used for irrigation. Reservoirs and hydroelectric stations created in the rivers Kura, Araz and Tartar are Shamkir, Mingachevir, Yenikend, Varvara, Araz and Sarsang. They are used to ensure the use of energy, irrigation and water supply.

== Largest reservoirs ==
№	Reservoir	Surface area, km^{2}	Capacity, km^{3}
1.	Mingachevir reservoir	605	15.730
2.	Shamkir reservoir	116	2.680
3.	Yenikend reservoir	23.2	1.580
4.	Aras Dam	145	1.254
5.	Sarsang Reservoir	14.2	0.565
6.	Taxtakorpu Reservoir	8.71	0.270
7.	Jeyranbatan reservoir	13.9	0.186
8.	Aghstafachay reservoir	6.3	0.120
9.	Varvara reservoir	22.5	0.060
10.	Xanbulanchay reservoir	24.6	0.052
11.	Xachınchay reservoir	1.76	0.023
12.	Zogalavachay reservoir		
13.	Maiden Tower water reservoir		

== Mingachevir reservoir ==
The largest reservoir of the republic is Mingachevir. It was commissioned in 1953.

The area is 605 km^{2}, the volume is 16.1 km^{3}, the length is 70 km, the greatest width is 18 km, the average depth is 27 m, the largest is 75 m. The altitude is 83 m. The purpose of its creation was the development of energy, agriculture, water transport, multi-year flow regulation and the liquidation of floods in the course of the river.

== Shamkir reservoir ==
The Shamkir reservoir was built on the Shamkir section of the Kura River in 1982. The area of the Shamkir reservoir is 116 km^{2}. The total volume of the reservoir is 2,677 million m^{3}, and the operating volume of water is 1425 million m^{3}. It is the second largest reservoir in the Caucasus after the Mingachevir reservoir. The normal water level in the tank is 158 m, and the surface area is 115 km^{2}.

== Yenikend reservoir ==
The Yenikend reservoir is a large reservoir in the Shamkir district. It is the third largest reservoir in the Caucasus after the Mingachevir and Shamkir reservoirs. The total area is 23.2 km^{2}, the water volume in the reservoir is 158 million m^{3}.

== Varvara reservoir ==
The Varvara reservoir is located 20 km to the south of the Mingachevir reservoir. It was built in 1952. The total area is 22.5 km^{2}, and the reservoir volume is 0.06 km^{3}

== Sarsang reservoir ==
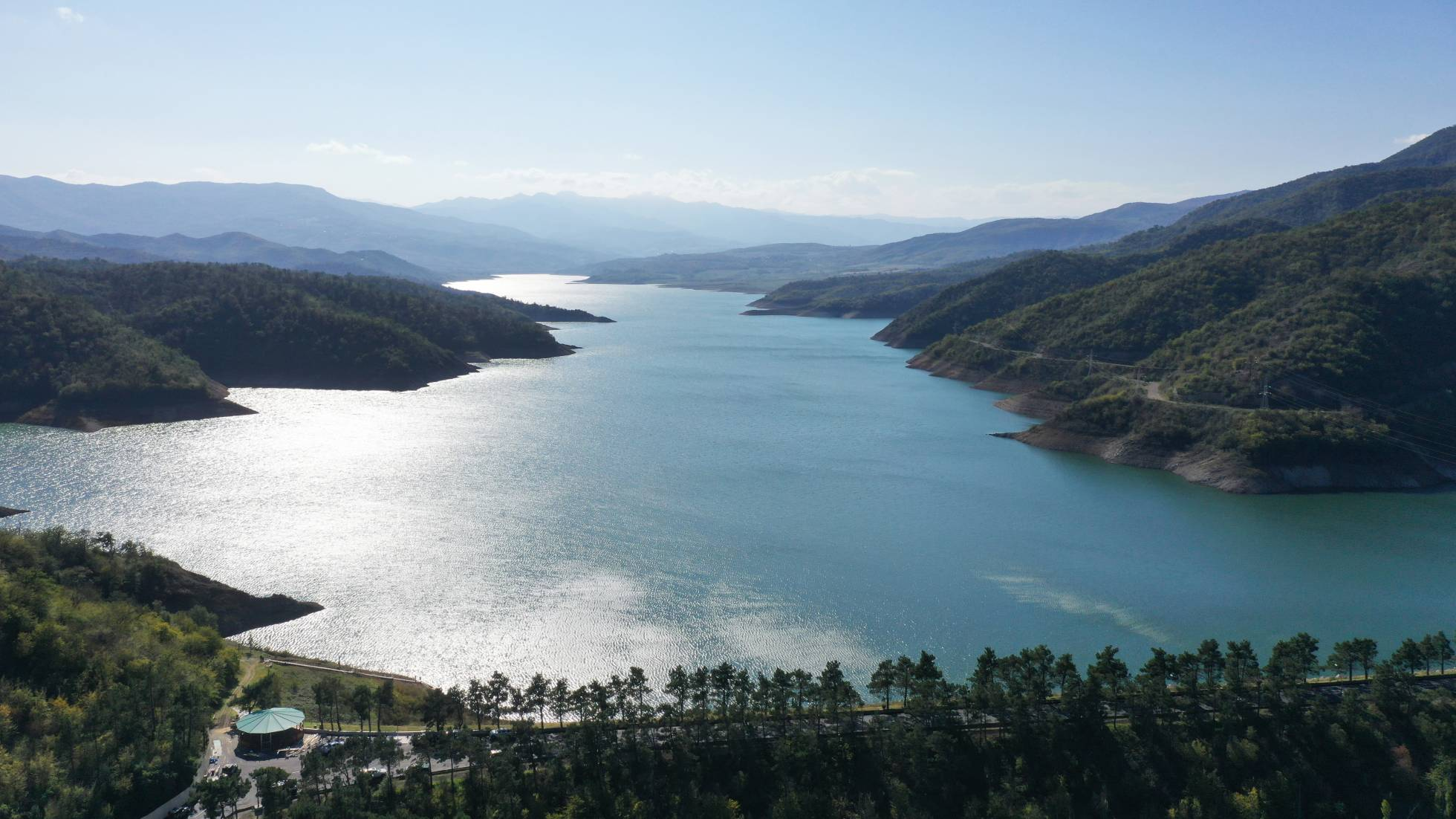
Sarsang reservoir October 2023

The Sarsang reservoir was built in Azerbaijan in 1976 on the Tartar River, in the former Agdara, in the present Terter district.

The reservoir has the highest dam of all the dams in Azerbaijan. Since the opening, the reservoir has provided irrigation water for 100,000 hectares of agricultural land in the areas of Tartar, Agdam, Barda, Goranboy, Yevlakh and Aghjabadi.

== Agstafachay reservoir ==
The Agstafacay reservoir is a large reservoir in the Agstafa region of northwestern Azerbaijan. The Agstafacay reservoir was built on the Agstafa river in 1969 near the village of Jafarli in the Qazakh district. The reservoir area is 6.3 km^{2}. The total volume of the reservoir is 120 million m^{3}. The height of the hydroelectric plant built on the reservoir is 52 m. The reservoir provides irrigation water up to 135 hectares of land in the Qazakh, Shamkir and Tovuz regions.

== Jeyranbatan reservoir ==
Jeyranbatan is a reservoir in the Absheron region in the eastern part of Azerbaijan. It is located between the cities of Baku and Sumgayit, near the settlement of Jeyranbatan, 20 km from Baku. It was built in 1958 to provide drinking water to the growing population of Baku and Sumgayit. The total area is 13.9 km^{2}, the reservoir volume is 186 million m^{3}, 150 million m^{3}used. The length of the reservoir is 8.74 km, the maximum width is 2.15 km, the length of the coastline is 23.3 km. The maximum depth of water in the tank is 28.5 m.

== Zogalavanchay reservoir ==
The Zohalavanchay reservoir is located on the Zogalavanchay Canyon in the southwestern part of the Shamakhi district of the Republic of Azerbaijan. The reservoir was commissioned in 1973 to meet the drinking water needs of wineries and settlements. Due to financial difficulties in the 1990s, the work of the reservoir was not properly performed, and the facilities were in poor condition. Some of the mechanical and electrical equipment was destroyed, and some of them were technically obsolete. In accordance with the order of the Cabinet of Ministers in 2007, the Azerbaijan Melioration and Water Management Company of the Republic of Azerbaijan initiated the repair of the Zogalavanchay Reservoir. In 2012, the tank was renovated in accordance with modern requirements. The height of the dam is 26 m, the length is 560 m, the total water tank is 3.8 million m^{3}.

== Other reservoirs ==
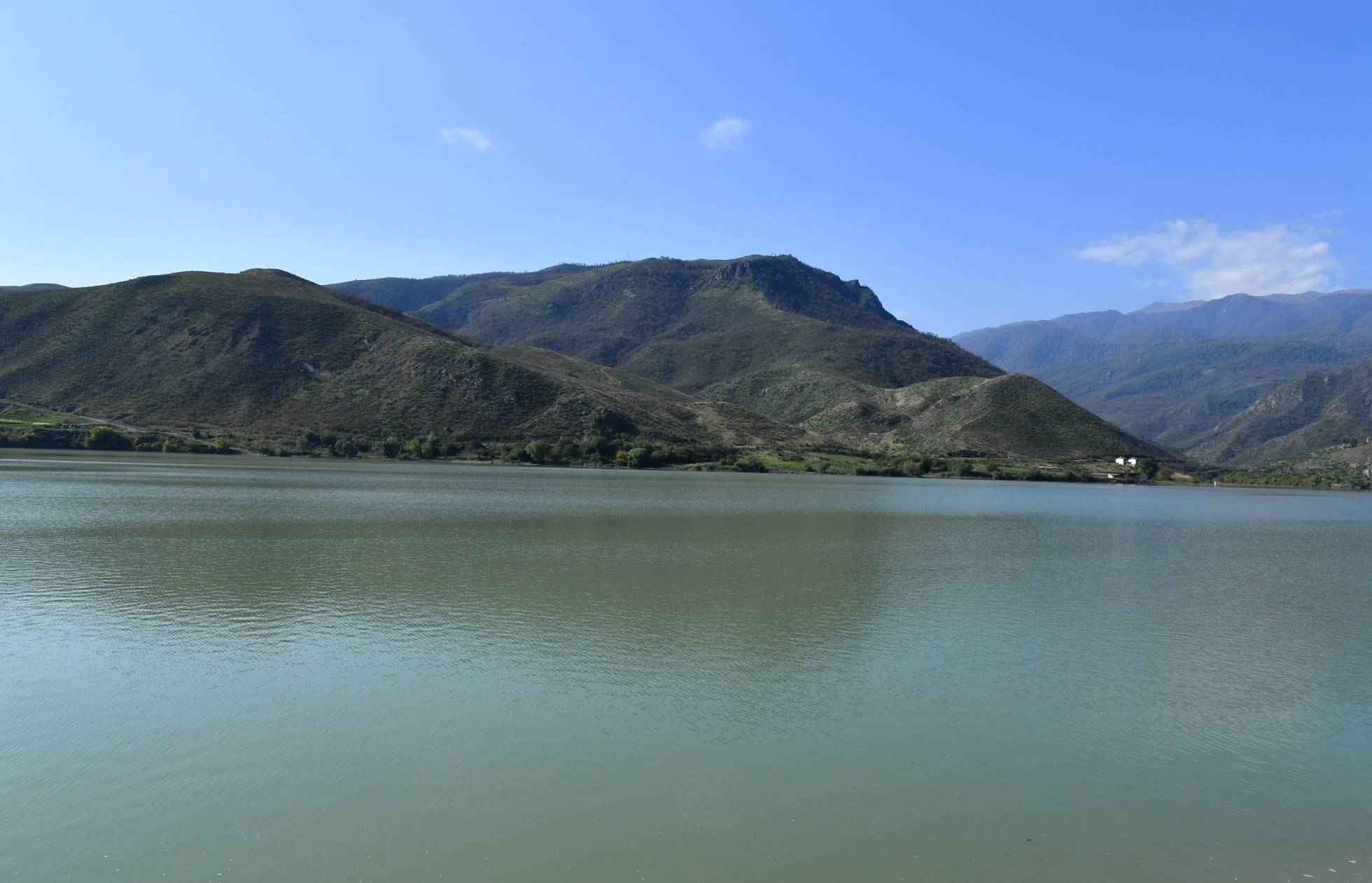
Sugovushan reservoir October 2023

=== Khachinchay ===
Reservoir on Khachinchay river was built in 1964. The volume of the reservoir is 23 million m^{3}. Absolute height is 507 m, the surface area is 1.76 km^{2}.

=== Ganligol ===
The reservoir located at the highest altitude is located in Garabagh. This reservoir was built in 1965 year. Its volume is 1.0 million m^{3}, the surface area is 0.1 km^{2}, the absolute height is 242.0 m.

=== Arpachay ===
The reservoir Arpachay was built in 1977 on the river of the same name. The source is the river Arpachay. Its volume is 150.0 million m^{3}, the surface area is 6.3 km^{2}, the absolute height is 955 m.

=== Agdamkend ===
The Agdamkend reservoir was built in 1962 on the Gargar River. Its volume is 1.6 million m^{3}, the surface area is 0.5 km^{2}, the absolute height is 291.5 m.

== See also ==
- Rivers of Azerbaijan
