= Shamkirchay reservoir =

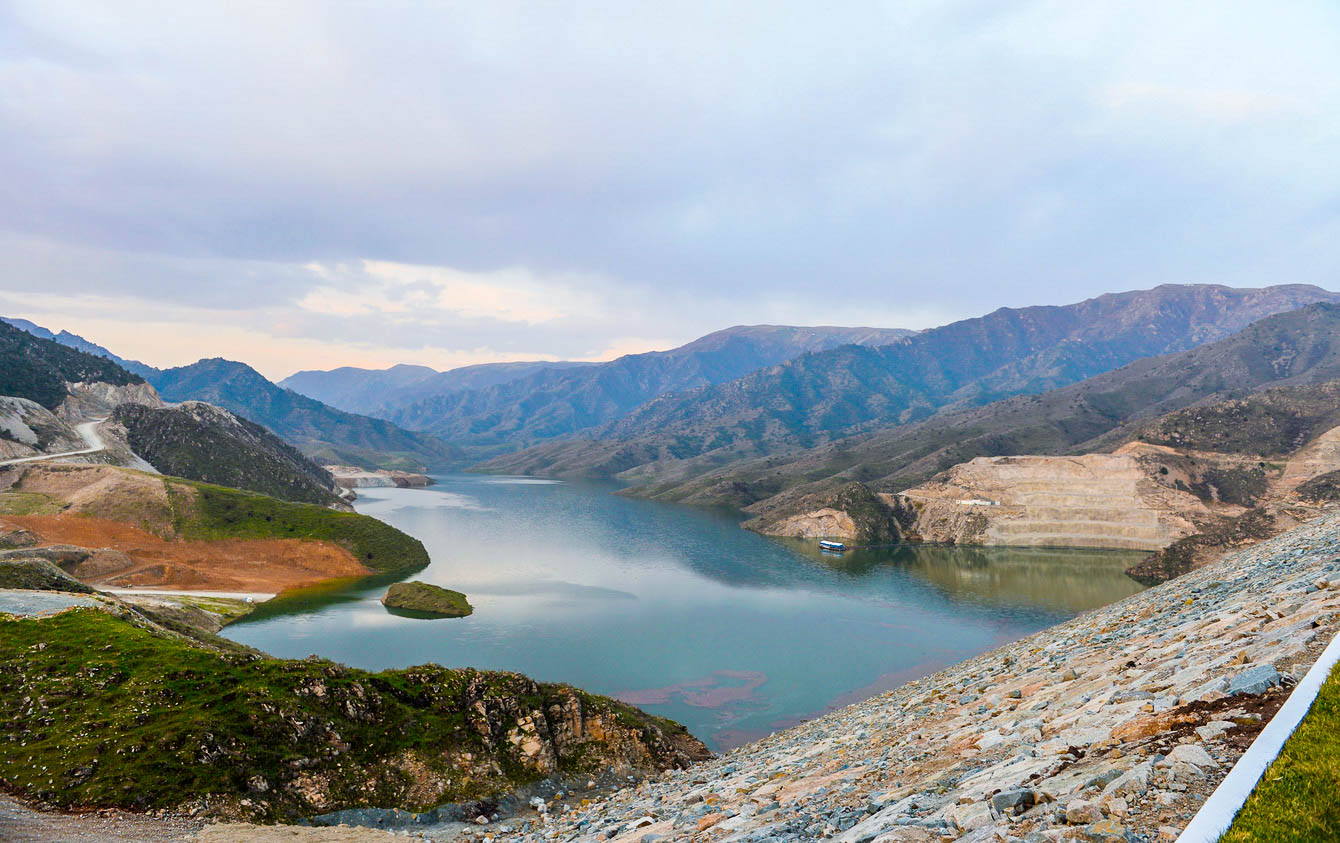
- Shamkirchay reservoir

- Location within Azerbaijan
- Location: Shamkir District
- Coordinates: 40°40′47″N 46°01′45″E
- Type: reservoir
- Primary inflows: Shamkirchay
- Primary outflows: Shamkirchay
- Basin countries: Azerbaijan
- Built: 2014

Shamkirchay reservoir (Azerbaijani: Şəmkirçay su anbarı) is an artificial reservoir in the Shamkir district of Azerbaijan. It is located on the slope of the Lesser Caucasus on the Shamkirchay river. The volume of the reservoir is 164.5 million m^{3} (according to other sources - 164 million m^{3}). Useful volume considered - 156.3 million m^{3}.

The reservoir was commissioned in 2014. It is used for the irrigation of 70 thousand hectares of agricultural land, and also serves as a source of water for Shamkir and Ganja cities. It also helps to protect the lower course of Kura from floods.

The hydroelectric power plant located in the reservoir has a capacity of 24.4 MW.

The climate in the vicinity of the reservoir is moderately warm, typical for dry steppes. The average annual temperature is 12.9 °C, the average July temperature is 23-26 °C, the maximum can reach 37-40 °C. In winter, temperatures stay near freezing. There are registered 350–600 mm of precipitation falls annually (according to other sources - 240-390mm). Evaporation makes 700–1100 mm. The average annual air humidity is 67%.

The soils in the reservoir basin are predominantly (80% of the area) gray-brown (chestnut), have a thickness of the fertile layer of 40–50 cm.

== See also ==
- Mingachevir reservoir
- Shamkir reservoir
- Zogalavachay reservoir
