= Aghstafachay reservoir =

Reservoir in Azerbaijan

- Location within Azerbaijan
- Location: Aghstafa District, Gazakh District, Azerbaijan
- Coordinates: 41°02′31″N 45°15′22″E
- Type: reservoir
- Primary inflows: Aghstafa River
- Primary outflows: Aghstafa River
- Basin countries: Azerbaijan
- Surface area: 6.3 km^{2} (2.4 sq mi)
- Water volume: 120 million cubic metres (4.2×10^{9} cu ft)

The Aghstafachay reservoir (Azerbaijani: Ağstafaçay su anbarı) is a large reservoir in the Aghstafa District of northwestern Azerbaijan.

== Overview ==
The Aghstafachay reservoir was built on Aghstafa River in 1969 near the village of Cəfərli of Qazakh District. The area of the Aghstafa reservoir is 6.3 km^{2} (2.4 sq mi). The overall volume of the reservoir is 120 million m^{3}. The height of the hydroelectric power station built on the reservoir is 52 m (171 ft). The reservoir provides irrigation water to 135 ha (330 acres) of land in Aghstafa, Qazakh, Shamkir and Tovuz raions.

== See also ==
- Rivers and lakes in Azerbaijan
- Mingachevir reservoir
- Shamkir reservoir
- Araz reservoir
