= Lake Sarysu =

Meromictic lake and wetland in Azerbaijan

- Location within Azerbaijan
- Interactive map of Lake Sarysu
- Location: Imishli Rayon; Sabirabad Rayon
- Coordinates: 40°02′50″N 48°10′22″E
- Type: Meromictic lake, wetland
- Primary inflows: Lake Ağgöl
- Primary outflows: Kura River
- Catchment area: Endorheic basin
- Basin countries: Azerbaijan
- Max. length: 22 km (14 mi)
- Max. width: 3 km (1.9 mi)
- Surface area: 65.7 km^{2} (25.4 sq mi)
- Average depth: .5 m (1 ft 8 in)
- Max. depth: 6.05 m (19.8 ft)
- Water volume: 60 million m^{3} (2.1 billion cu ft)
- Shore length^{1}: 0.9 m (2 ft 11 in)
- ^{1} Shore length is not a well-defined measure.

Sarysu (Azerbaijani: Sarısu meaning "Yellow Water") is the largest lake of Azerbaijan located in Imishli and Sabirabad raions of the Kur-Araz Lowland.

== Overview ==
Sarysu lake stretches along the Kura River from Imishli Rayon southeast to Sabirabad Rayon, reaching a total length of 22 km (14 mi). It is one of the four lakes in the area. The water in the lake is fresh water. The lake inflows from Lake Ağgöl through a canal – and which is also replenished by groundwater and rain – and outflows to the Kura River. The outflow to Kura is regulated by a water-releasing station in Muradbəyli.

The lake is separated from the residential areas in the north by a highway, which prevents it from potential pollution. The southern part of the lake has been polluted from waters of onshore oil production activities in the past.

The shoreline of Sarysu is mainly made up of wetlands and swamps. The overall area is 65.7 km^{2} (25.4 sq mi). The approximate volume of water in the lake is 60 million m^{3}. The average depth is 1–3 meters, at the shoreline 0.1-0.9 meters. The increases of volume of water is mainly observed in spring and fall seasons. During the winter season, the average ice-covering period is 11 days. The lake is rich with common carp and vobla. Favorable conditions at the lake attract 300-350 thousand migrating birds during the winter. Mineralization at Sarysu is high.

== Overflowing and floods ==
The river sometimes overflows and floods. In 1976, the overflowing of the Kura River caused the lake to increase in size by 3–5 times. In May 2010, major flooding struck the area. Heavy rains caused the volume level of the Kura river to increase by 12 cm and the level of lake Sarysu by 20 cm. On 24 May 2010, Muradbeyli village, surrounded by the lake on the south and the Kura River on the north, completely flooded, collapsing the dam. Muradbəyli and three other villages Qasımbəyli, Əsgərbəyli, Axtaçı of Sabirabad Rayon as well as Nərimankənd, Musalı, Dəllər and Novruzlu of Saatly Rayon were evacuated.

Sarysu is a primary source for fishing and partially for irrigation.

== See also ==
- Rivers and lakes in Azerbaijan
