= Lake Ağgöl =

- Location within Azerbaijan
- Interactive map of Lake Ağgöl
- Location: Aghjabadi Rayon; Imishli Rayon
- Coordinates: 40°0′0″N 47°40′1″E
- Type: Floodplain, Eutrophic lake, wetland
- Primary inflows: underground waters from river Araz, Ajinohur
- Catchment area: Endorheic basin
- Basin countries: Azerbaijan
- Surface area: 56.2 km^{2} (21.7 sq mi)
- Average depth: 0.8 m (2 ft 7 in)
- Max. depth: 2.5 m (8 ft 2 in)
- Water volume: 44.7 million cubic metres (1.58×10^{9} cu ft)
- Islands: two (2) islands of 10 ha (0.10 km^{2}) covered with reed

Ramsar Wetland
- Official name: Agh-Ghol
- Designated: 21 May 2001
- Reference no.: 1075

Lake Ağgöl (Aghgol, lit. 'White Lake') is a large salty lake in the Kur-Araz Lowland, specifically the Aghjabadi and Imishli rayons of Azerbaijan. It is the second-largest of about 450 lakes in the country. Ağgöl is considered an important habitat in Azerbaijan and the Caucasus. Located in the Ağgöl National Park, it is a part of the wetland system, which is an important location for migratory birds, especially for globally endangered species stopping over and breeding at the lake.

== Overview ==
=== History ===
Ağgöl is believed to be one of the seven lakes which were created as a result of a major earthquake in Ganja on September 25, 1139, when a huge block of Mount Kapaz collapsed blocking the path of rivers thus creating a beautiful lake Göygöl and seven other smaller lakes: Maral-gol, Jeyran-gol, Ordek-gol, Zalugolu, Aggöl, Garagol and Shamligol. The further formation of the lake was also due to landslides. Origins of the lake are connected to Araz and Kura rivers, as well as rivers originating in Karabakh Plateau. The water flowing in from Araz enriches the lake with chlorides and has high mineralization. It is argued that throughout the ages, the rivers have flooded the area creating depressions and then refilled them with water. Before the 20th century, Ağgöl was already partially fed by drainage waters from irrigated fields. The volume of water in the lake had fluctuated in the past when it faced being dried out in single years and when it reached very high volumes of water in other years. When the Mingachevir dam was built in the mid 20th century, the water regime in the Mil steppe and Kura-Araz lowland changed. From 1960, the water to the lake inflowed only from saline water collectors built in the region to drain irrigation waters. In the present, the lake is fed by "K-2" and "K-3" collectors. Some areas around the lake have been used as pasture grounds. Other areas were transformed into irrigated agricultural lands used to grow cotton, wheat, lucerne, vegetables and wine.

=== Protected area ===
The Ağgöl is often described as eutrophic lake. The overall area is about 56.2 km^{2} (21.7 sq mi) and the volume of water in the lake is 44.7 million m^{3}. The average water depth of 0.8 m, maximum depth being 2.5 m. Water levels tend to be lowest in August. With the arrival of fall, the level rises and reaches its maximum during the rain season in the spring. There are two islands (10 ha) covered by reed. In 1978, the area of the lake was declared zapovednik thus setting the highest level of protection category allowing only the scientific research. In 2001, the global importance of the lake was internationally recognized when the area was declared as Important Bird Area (IBA) when it was placed in the list of Ramsar wetlands of international importance. Therefore, in 2003, the protected area was enlarged by the presidential decree to the size 18,000 ha (180 km^{2}). It is managed by the Ministry of Ecology and Natural Resources of Azerbaijan Republic. The ministry supervises the activities in preservation of the flora and fauna in the protected area and guards it against illegal hunting and fishing.

=== Climate ===
The lake usually does not freeze, with a few exceptions due to infrequent severe frost. The total annual precipitation at the lake is up to 332 mm, minimum being 13 mm in August and maximum of 37 mm in March.

== Effects of Karabakh conflict ==
Due to the Nagorno-Karabakh conflict, Azerbaijani refugees and internally displaced persons from Karabakh and Armenia were resettled in many regions of Azerbaijan, a large part of which was concentrated in the Aghjabadi district; some were placed in villages around Ağgöl. Due to lack of food, this caused an increase in illegal fishing, thus affecting the fauna of the lake.

== See also ==
- Ağgöl National Park
- Gizil-Agach State Reserve
- Lake Sarysu
- Rivers and lakes in Azerbaijan
