= Yenikend reservoir =

- Location within Azerbaijan
- Location: Shamkir Rayon, Samukh Rayon, Azerbaijan
- Coordinates: 40°55′57″N 46°14′50″E
- Type: reservoir
- Primary inflows: Kura River
- Primary outflows: Kura River
- Basin countries: Azerbaijan
- Surface area: 23.2 km^{2} (9.0 sq mi)
- Water volume: 158 million cubic metres (128,000 acre⋅ft)

The Yenikend reservoir (Azerbaijani: Yenikənd su anbarı) is a large reservoir in the Shamkir Rayon of northwestern Azerbaijan. It is the third-largest reservoir in the Caucasus after the Mingachevir and Shamkir reservoirs.

== Overview ==
Yenikend reservoir is located 14 km to the east of Shamkir reservoir. The reservoir with the 150 megawatt four turbine hydroelectric power station was built on Kura River and released for exploitation in 2000 in order to produce additional energy for surrounding regions. The overall area is 23.2 km^{2} (9.0 sq mi), water volume in the reservoir is 158 million m^{3}.

Through the Qarasaqqal channel, the reservoir provides irrigation water to 6,000 ha (60 km^{2}) of land in Samukh Rayon. Since the start of its operations, the reservoir has not reserved water for long periods of time. Approximately 850 m^{3} (30,000 cu ft) of water is received from Kura and the same volume is simultaneously discharged.

== See also ==
- Rivers and lakes in Azerbaijan
- Mingachevir reservoir
- Shamkir reservoir
- Araz reservoir
