= Mil-Mughan reservoir =

- Location within Azerbaijan
- Coordinates: 39°26′03″N 47°21′48″E
- Type: reservoir
- Basin countries: Azerbaijan; İran
- Built: 1970

Mil-Mughan reservoir (Azerbaijani: Mil-Muğan su anbarı, Mil-Muğan hidroqovşağı) is a reservoir and water-collecting hydroelectric complex on the Araz river, located on the border of Azerbaijan and Iran. The reservoir is located near the town of Horadiz in the Fuzuli district of Azerbaijan.

== History ==
On 27 July 1963, an agreement on economic and technical cooperation was signed between the USSR and Iran. Based on this agreement, the parties in 1967 began the construction of the reservoir, which was completed in 1970 and put into operation in 1971.

== Description ==
The hydroelectric complex consists of two bulk dams, a spillway and two water collection facilities. From the catchment hydroelectric complex, water is supplied to the Main Mil (Azerbaijan) and the Main Mughan (Iran) canals. The length of the concrete dam is 125 m; the total length of the dams is 2800 m. The area of the reservoir is 996 hectares. The average depth is 5 m. Height above sea level - 150 m.

The construction of the Mil-Mughan reservoir made it possible to start irrigating more than 100 000 hectares of new land (of which about 60 000 hectares are in Azerbaijan), and also facilitated the irrigation of about 200 000 hectares of territory.

The reservoir is the largest bird habitat in the province and it belongs to Ramsar Sites. Here have been recorded 73 species of birds, 11 species of reptiles, 13 species of fish, 3 species of amphibians and 11 species of mammals.

== See also ==
- Mingachevir reservoir
- Shamkir reservoir
- Zogalavachay reservoir
