= Bodies of water of Azerbaijan =

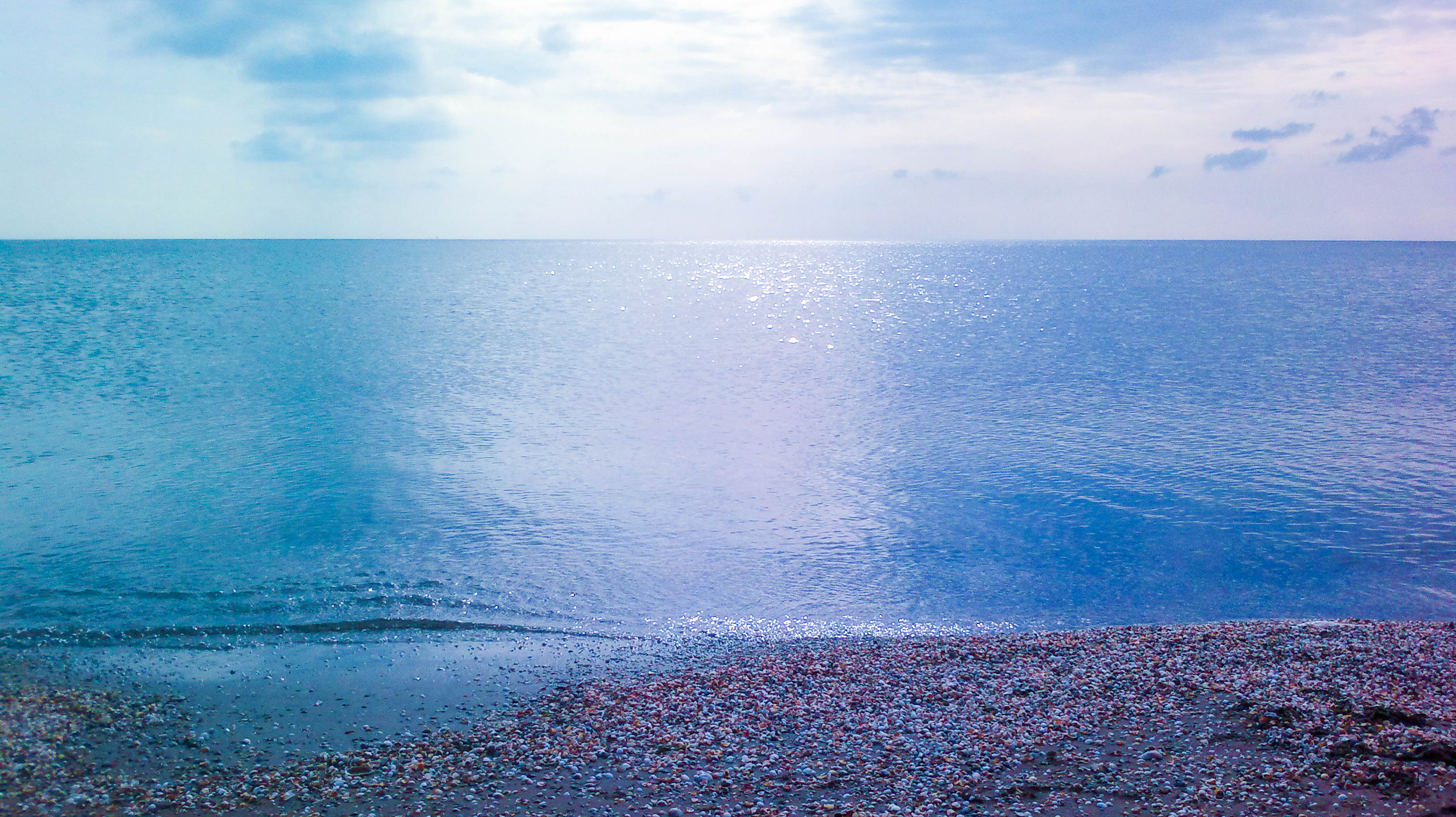
Caspian Sea coast in Hovsan

The water bodies of Azerbaijan were formed over a long geological timeframe and changed significantly throughout that period. This is particularly evidenced by remnants of ancient rivers found throughout the country. The country's water systems are continually changing under the influence of natural forces and human-introduced industrial activities. Artificial rivers (canals) and ponds are a part of Azerbaijan's water systems.

The hydrography of Azerbaijan basically belongs to the Caspian Sea basin.

== Rivers ==
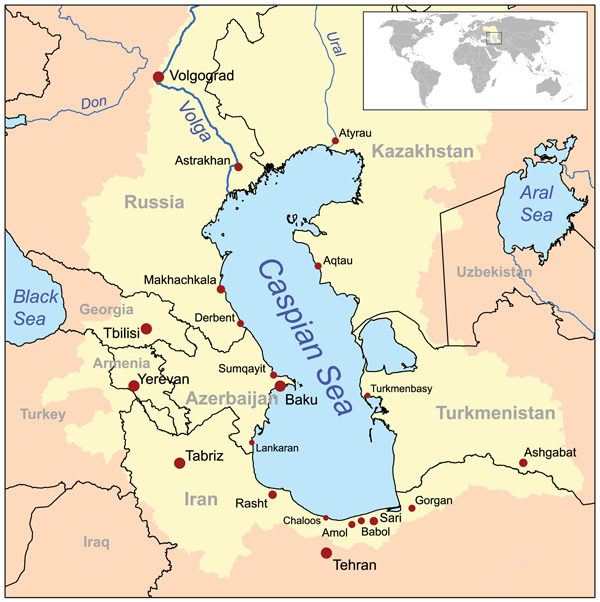
A map of the Caspian Sea drainage basin to which all rivers in Azerbaijan flow to

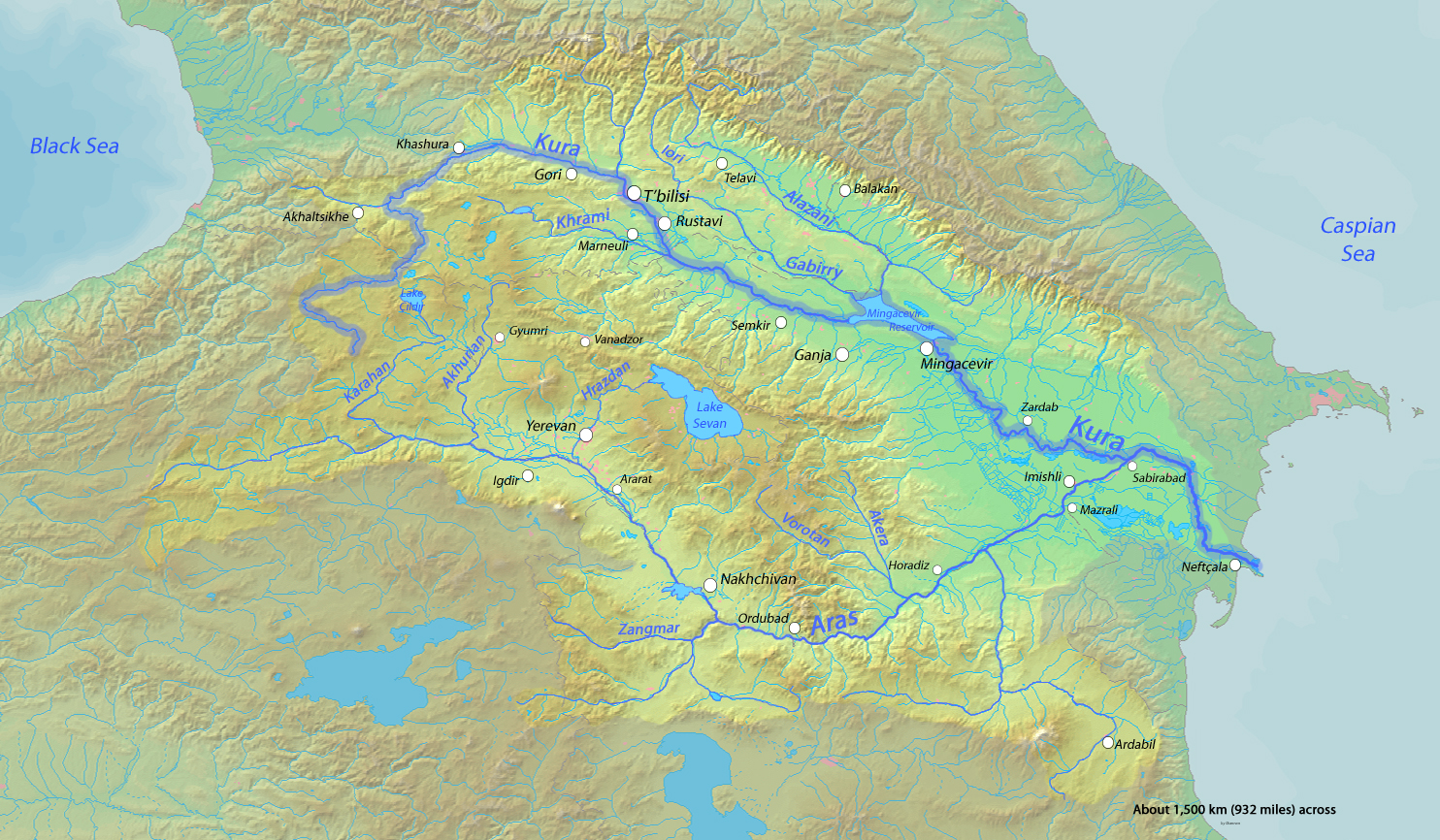
The Kur and Aras are the longest rivers of Azerbaijan and their drainage basin covers most of the country.

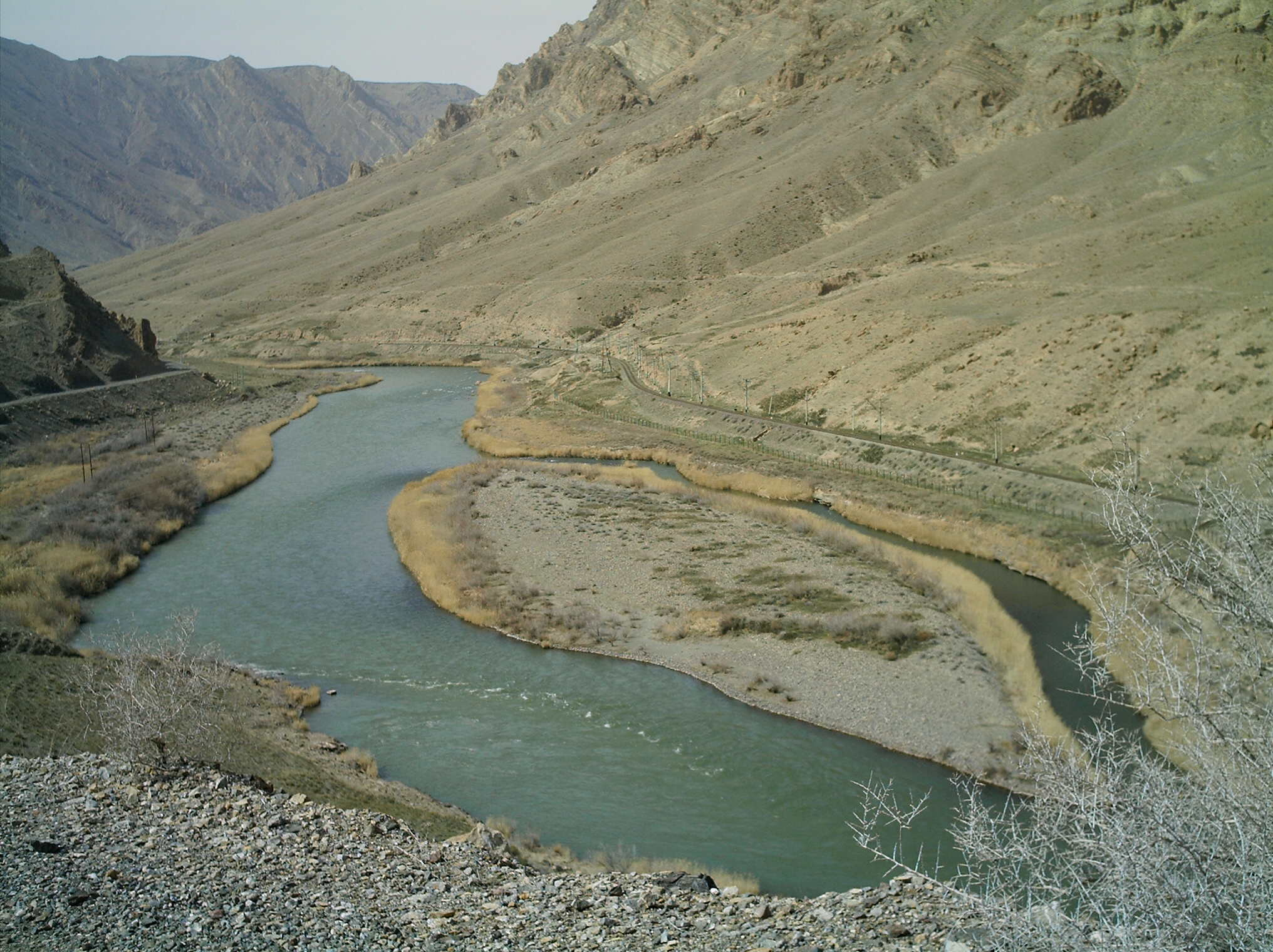
The Araz River along the Iranian border with Nakhchivan, Azerbaijan

Rivers form the principal part of the water systems of Azerbaijan. There are 8,359 rivers of various lengths within Azerbaijan. Of them, 8,188 rivers are less than 25 kilometres (16 mi) long. Only 24 rivers are over 100 kilometres (62 mi) long.

The largest rivers that flow wholly or partially through the country are:

- Kür, main water source and the artery of the country
- Araz
- Qanıx, located in Alazan
- Qabırlı, also known as Iori
- Khrami
- Samur
- Pirsaatçay
- Bolgar-Chay, located in Jalilabad District
- Ağstafa
- Hekeriychay, also known as Hekeri
- Kurekchay
- Tərtərçay
  - Ağdabançay
  - Levçay
  - Turağayçay
- Türyançay
- Vilesh
- Qarqarçay

=== River system ===
The rivers in Azerbaijan can be divided into three groups:

1. The Kur basin rivers (Qanix, Qabirri, Turyan, Agstafa, Shekir, Terter, Khachin, etc.)
2. The Araz basin rivers (Arpachay, Nakhchivan, Okhchu, Hekeri, Kondelenchay, etc.)
3. Rivers, flowing directly into the Caspian Sea (Samur, Gudyal, Velvele, Vilesh, Lenkeran, etc.)

Azerbaijan river systems are changing and evolving under the influence of various physiographic factors: climate, landscape, geological structure, soil and vegetation. The density of the river network increases, then gradually decreases later with higher altitudes. Except for the Talysh region (1.6-2.2 km/km^{2}), the river system density is the highest (1–2 km/km^{2}) at 1,000-2,500 kilometers, while in the area of the Talysh mountains it peaks at 1.6-2.2 km/km^{2} at 500–1,000 km. The average density of the river system of Azerbaijan is 0.39 km/km^{2}. The density is even lower than 0.05 km/km^{2} in the plains.

=== Kura and Aras ===
The Kur and Aras are the longest rivers in Azerbaijan. They run through the Kur-Araz Lowland. The rivers that directly flow into the Caspian Sea, originate mainly from the north-eastern slope of the Greater Caucasus and Talysh Mountains and run along the Samur-Devechi and Lenkeran lowlands.

The Kura River basin area (86,000 km^{2}) up to the junction with the Aras River is smaller than the Aras water basin (101,937 km^{2}). The river is still called Kura on the junction because the water level of the Kura is twice as high as that of the Aras River.

== Lakes ==
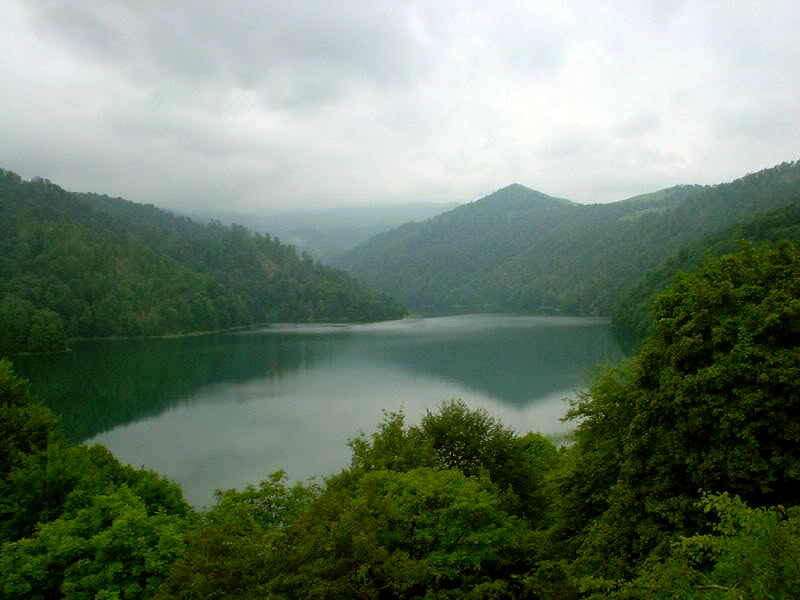
Lake Göygöl

- Ağgöl
- Ajinohur
- Alagöl
- Boyukshor
- Göygöl
- Hajikabul
- Jandari
- Maral-gol
- Masazirgol
- Sarysu, the largest lake by area and volume

== Reservoirs ==
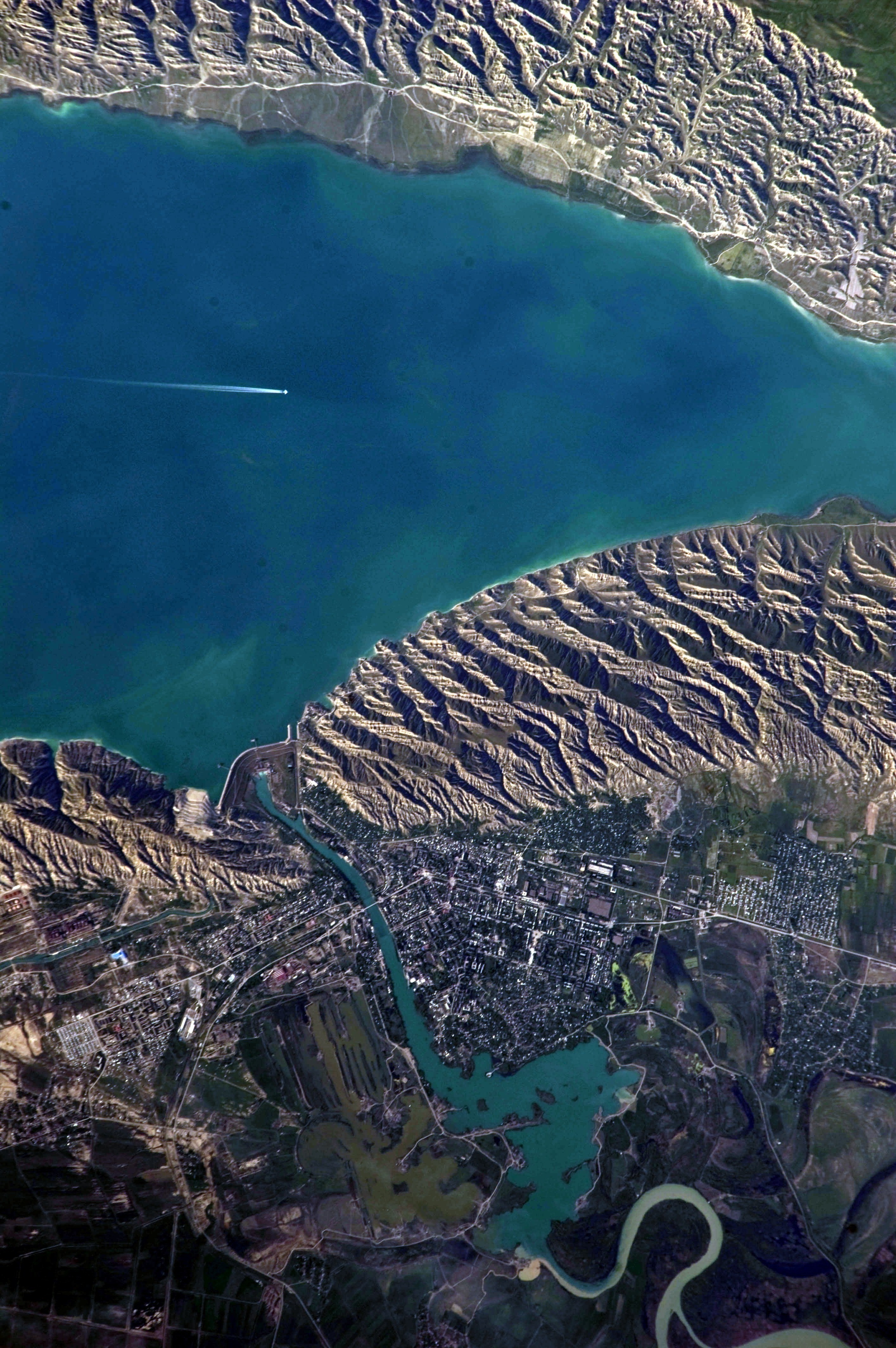
Mingachevir Reservoir seen from space

Over 60 water reservoirs have been constructed in order to regulate the river flow in Azerbaijan. The formation of these reservoirs is one of the measures that has been undertaken in order to ration the utilization of water and energy resources.

The largest water reservoirs are:

- Agstafachay
- Araz
- Jeyranbatan
- Khanbulanchay
- Khudaferin
- Mingachevir, the largest reservoir by area
- Sarsang
- Shamkir
- Varvara
- Vileshchay
- Yenikend

The reservoirs in Azerbaijan are designed to be utilized for various purposes, while most other ponds are used exclusively for irrigation.

== See also ==
- Environment of Azerbaijan
