= Khanbulanchay reservoir =

Khanbulanchay Reservoir
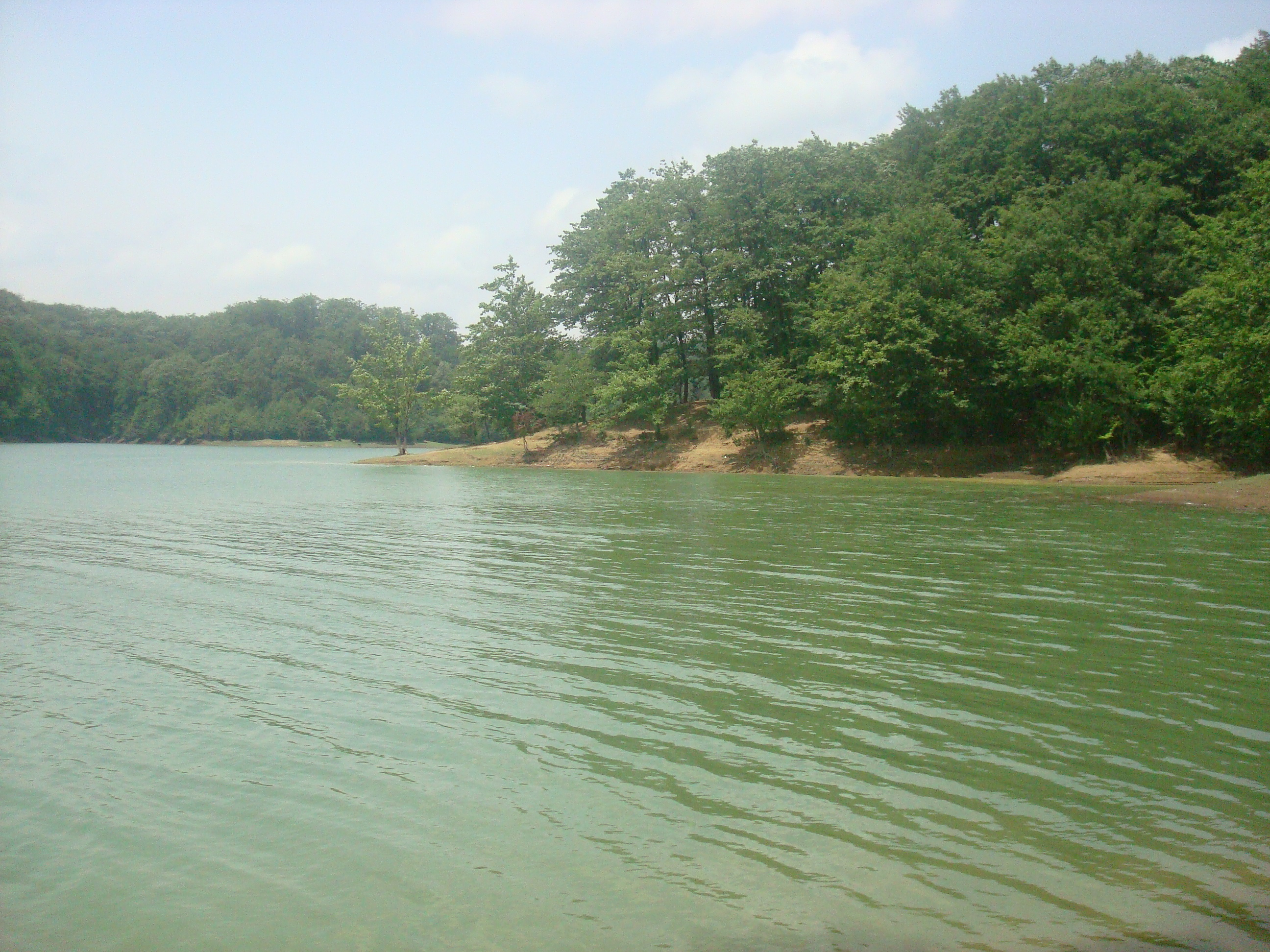
- Khanbulanchay Reservoir

- Location within Azerbaijan
- Location: Lankaran Rayon, Azerbaijan
- Coordinates: 38°39′07″N 48°46′28″E
- Type: reservoir
- Primary inflows: Bəşəriçay
- Primary outflows: Bəşəriçay
- Basin countries: Azerbaijan
- Max. length: 3.5 km (2.2 mi)
- Surface area: 2.46 km^{2} (0.95 sq mi)
- Water volume: 52 million cubic metres (42,000 acre⋅ft)

Khanbulanchay reservoir (Azerbaijani: Xanbulançay su anbarı), also known as Khanbulaqchay reservoir (Azerbaijani: Xanbulaqçay su anbarı), is a reservoir in Lankaran Rayon of southeastern Azerbaijan. The name means "the spring of the khan" in Azerbaijani language.

== Overview ==
The reservoir was built on the Bəşərü river in 1976. The overall area is 2.46 km^{2} (0.95 sq mi). The volume of water in the reservoir is 52 million m³. The altitude of the dam built on the reservoir is 64 m (210 ft), the length is 550 m (1,800 ft). The reservoir is used for irrigation purposes in 22 ha (0.22 km^{2}) of land in the subtropical zone through the 7.8 km (4.8 mi) and 8.2 km (5.1 mi) long channels.

== See also ==
- Rivers and lakes in Azerbaijan
- Mingachevir reservoir
- Shamkir reservoir
