= Muradbəyli =

Muradbəyli or Muradbeyli or Muradbegly may refer to:

- Muradbeyli, Agdam, Azerbaijan
- Muradbəyli, Sabirabad, Azerbaijan
