= Varvara reservoir =

Dam in Yevlakh District, Azerbaijan

Varvara Dam
- Official name: Varvara Dam
- Country: Azerbaijan
- Location: Yevlakh District
- Coordinates: 40°41′01″N 47°05′33″E
- Opening date: 1952

Dam and spillways
- Impounds: Kura River

Reservoir
- Creates: Varvara Dam Reservoir
- Total capacity: 62 000 000 m³

The Varvara reservoir (Azerbaijani: Varvara su anbarı) is a reservoir near Mingachevir, Azerbaijan.

== Overview ==
Varvara reservoir is located 20 km (12 mi) south of Mingachevir reservoir. It was built in 1952 to manage the daily outflow of water from Mingachevir reservoir discharging into Kura river, to produce electricity. The water reservoir has three sections: upper, middle and lower. The overall area is 22.5 km^{2} (8.7 sq mi) and the reservoir volume is 0.06 km^{3} (0.014 cu mi). The depth of water in the reservoir is 8.2 m (27 ft) and the surface area is 20.5 km^{2} (7.9 sq mi). The length of the reservoir is 13 km (8.1 mi) and its width is 3.4 km (2.1 mi). The shoreline length is 31 km (19 mi).

== Hydroelectric power station ==
A 16,500 kilowatt hydroelectric power station with 3 turbines is a part of the reservoir complex.

== See also ==
- Rivers and lakes in Azerbaijan
