= Zogalavachay reservoir =

Irrigation source in Azerbaijan

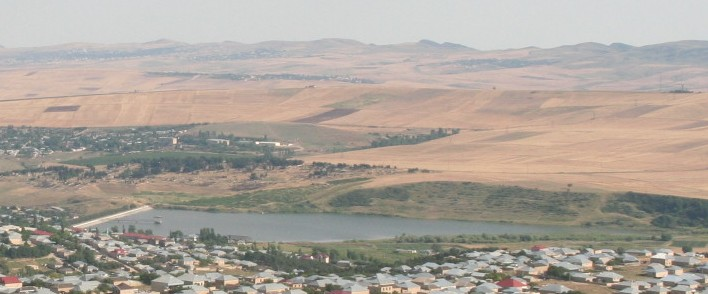
- Zogalavachay Reservoir, photographed 2016

- Location within Azerbaijan
- Location: Shamakhi District
- Coordinates: 40°37′33″N 48°37′44″E
- Type: reservoir
- Primary inflows: Zogalavachay
- Primary outflows: Zogalavachay
- Basin countries: Azerbaijan
- Built: 1974

Zogalavachay reservoir (Azerbaijani: Zoğalavaçay su anbarı) is a reservoir located on the Zogalavachay river in the Shamakhi district of the Republic of Azerbaijan, in southwest of the city of Shamakhi.

The reservoir was commissioned in 1974. The total volume of the reservoir is 3.4 million m³, while the useful volume is 3 million m³.

The reservoir is used for irrigation and water supply, as well as for regulating the flow of the Zogalavachay river.

In 2012, a repair of the reservoir was carried out in accordance with modern requirements.

== See also ==
- Shamkir reservoir
- Mingachevir reservoir
- Shamkirchay reservoir
