= Guludash Peak =

Mountain in Azerbaijan

Guludash Peak (Azerbaijani: Quludaş zirvəsi) is a peak in Talysh Mountains range in southeastern Azerbaijan. It is 2,203 metres (7,228 ft) above the sea level.

The Vilesh River headwaters are in this peak.

== Sources ==
- Viləşçay river
