= Shamkirchay =

- Native name: Şəmkirçay (Azerbaijani)

Location
- Country: Azerbaijan
- Region: Caucasus
- District: Shamkir

Physical characteristics
- Source: Lesser Caucasus
  - location: Gadabay, Gadabay Rayon, Azerbaijan
  - coordinates: 40°29′40″N 45°49′49″E
- Mouth: Kura
  - location: near Shamkir, Azerbaijan
  - coordinates: 40.9175°N 46.1656°E

Basin features
- Progression: Kura→ Caspian Sea

The Shamkirchay (Azerbaijani: Şəmkirçay) is one of the tributaries of the Kura River located in northwestern part of Republic of Azerbaijan.

== Overview ==
It starts in Gadabay district and ends in Shamkir. The government is building a water navigation tunnel on the river for irrigation purposes which will be 885 m (2,904 ft) long.

== See also ==
- Rivers and lakes in Azerbaijan
- Shamkir reservoir
