= Muradbeyli, Agdam =

Muradbeyli
- Location within Azerbaijan Location within Karabakh Economic Region
- Coordinates: 39°58′N 46°55′E
- Country: Azerbaijan
- Rayon: Agdam
- Time zone: UTC+4 (AZT)
  - Summer (DST): UTC+5 (AZT)

Muradbeyli (also known as Muradbegly) is a village in the Agdam Rayon of Azerbaijan. Previously, the village was part of the Shikhbabalinsky village council. Later, the city of Agdam was included in the city council and designated as Muradbeyli district. There were about 200 houses in the village.

After the occupation by the Armenians, all houses and buildings were destroyed. Currently, according to satellite images, the area is mainly used as an agricultural field.

According to the statement dated 10/11/2020, he was liberated from occupation on 11/20/2020.
