= Vileshchay reservoir =

Dam in Masally District, Azerbaijan

Vileshchay Dam
- Official name: Vileshchay Dam
- Country: Azerbaijan
- Location: Masally District
- Coordinates: 39°00′14″N 48°35′27″E
- Purpose: recreation
- Opening date: 1986

Dam and spillways
- Impounds: Vileshchay River

Reservoir
- Creates: Vileshchay Dam Reservoir
- Total capacity: 46 000 000 m³

Vileshchay Reservoir is a reservoir created by the water of the Vilesh river, also called the Vileshchay river. The reservoir is located in the Masally Rayon of Azerbaijan.

The reservoir's volume is 46 million m^{3} and is a major attraction for tourists and therefore becoming a place of many hotels and resorts. The height of the dam is 37 meters and the overall horizontal length is 3.2 km. The government of the region will be increasing the height of the dam by 15 meters with a new construction, which is going to increase the volume to 130 million m^{3}.

In 2012, President Ilham Aliyev laid the foundations of a new water supply system in Masally, using the existing Vileshchay reservoir but also building a new reservoir.

According to a 2011 environmental assessment prepared by a Texas company (Aim Texas Trading), in cooperation with The World Bank, "Vileshchay Reservoir Water, is highly contaminated by the Enterococs [sic] and other microbial indicators because of the intensive breeding the stock and grazing activities in the upstreams of the river."
