= Cəfərli, Qazax =

Cəfərli
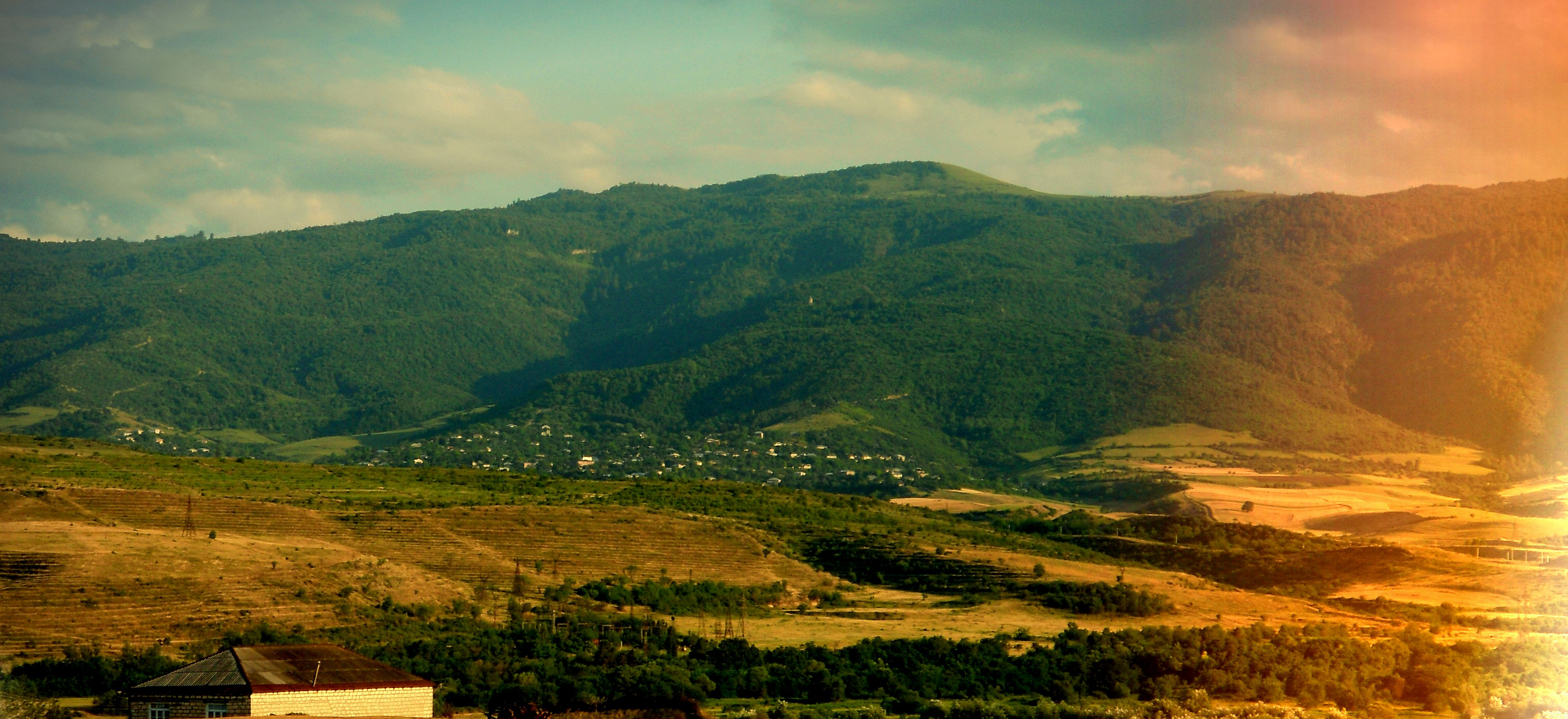

- Location in Azerbaijan
- Coordinates: 41°02′03″N 45°14′22″E
- Country: Azerbaijan
- District: Qazakh
- Time zone: UTC+4 (AZT)
  - Summer (DST): UTC+5 (AZT)

Cəfərli (also, Jafarli and Jafarly) is a village in the Qazakh District, in north-west Azerbaijan.
