= Vileshchay =

- Native name: Viləšərü (Talysh)

Location
- Country: Azerbaijan

Physical characteristics
- Source
  - location: Guludash Peak, Talysh Mountains
- Mouth: Caspian Sea
  - coordinates: 39.0460°N 48.8614°E
- Length: 115 km (71 mi)
- Basin size: 935 km^{2} (361 sq mi)

The Vileshchay (Azerbaijani: Viləşçay, Talysh: Viləšərü) is a river of Azerbaijan. It is one of the larger rivers of the country, flowing into the Caspian Sea in southeastern Azerbaijan.

== Overview ==
The Vilesh is a part of Gizil-Agach State Reserve, an ecological haven for migratory birds, created in 1929. The river is 115 km (71 mi) long, with the basin size of 935 km^{2} (361 sq mi). It starts at the 2,203-metre-high (7,228 ft) Guludash Peak of Talysh Mountains. Along its path, it additionally branches off to Şərətük river on its right (29 km long) and Mətəli river on the left (21 km long). The river is considered to be one of the wildest bodies of water in the country, flooding the nearby villages during the rainy season. It goes through Yardimli and Masalli Districts in the Kur-Araz Lowland area. Most of the river water is contributed by rainfall (70%) and the rest derives from underground waters (20%) and melting snow in the mountains (10%). The river has a tendency to overflow from October to May every year due to heavy rainfall.

== Water usage ==
Vileshchay has healing minerals in the natural spring within, which are a cure to skin diseases. The waters from Vileshchay are heavily used for arrogation purposes. Vileshchay flows into a natural Vileshchay Reservoir. The reservoir's volume is forty-six million cubic metres (1.6×10^{9} cu ft) that makes the riverside locations in Masalli a major attraction for tourists and therefore becoming a place of many hotels and resorts.

== See also ==
- Tourism in Azerbaijan
