= Qasımbəyli, Sabirabad =

Qasımbəyli
- Municipality
- Location within Azerbaijan
- Coordinates: 40°02′35″N 48°18′37″E
- Country: Azerbaijan
- Rayon: Sabirabad

Population
  - Total: 1,080
- Time zone: UTC+4 (AZT)
  - Summer (DST): UTC+5 (AZT)

Qasımbəyli (also, Kasymbeyli) is a village and municipality in the Sabirabad Rayon of Azerbaijan. It has a population of 1,080.
