= Əsgərbəyli =

- Municipality
- Location within Azerbaijan
- Coordinates: 40°01′54″N 48°23′42″E
- Country: Azerbaijan
- Rayon: Sabirabad

Population
  - Total: 990
- Time zone: UTC+4 (AZT)
  - Summer (DST): UTC+5 (AZT)

Əsgərbəyli (also Askerbeyli) is a village and municipality in the Sabirabad Rayon of Azerbaijan. It has a population of 990.
