= Ajinohur =

Lake in Azerbaijan

- Acınohur Gölü (Azerbaijani)
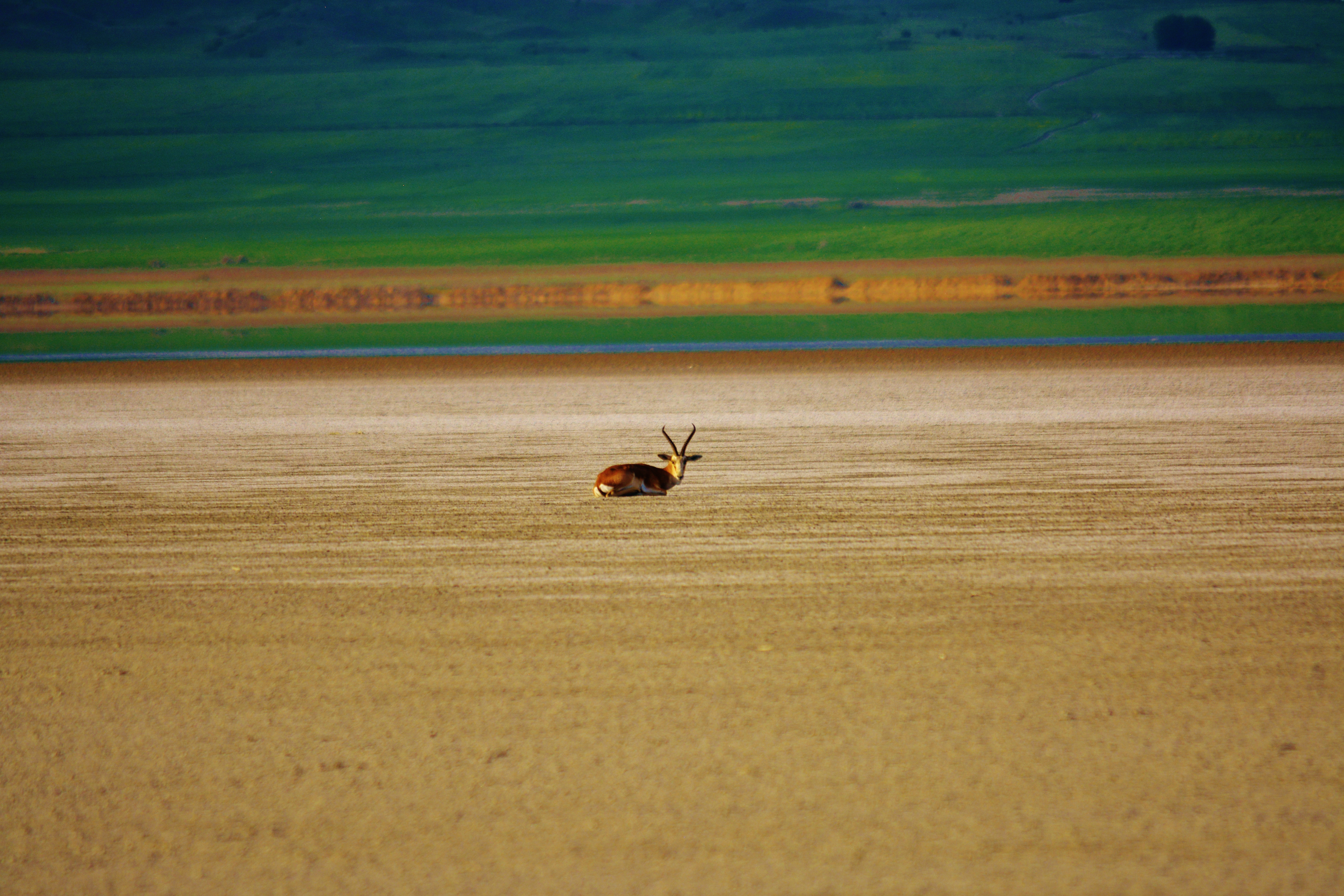

- Location within Azerbaijan
- Interactive map of Ajinohur
- Location: Shaki rayon, Azerbaijan
- Coordinates: 40°59′11″N 46°58′26″E
- Surface elevation: 107 m (351 ft)

Ajinohur or Acinohur Lake (Azerbaijani: Acınohur Gölü) is a lake in the Shaki rayon of Azerbaijan. It is 107 metres (351 ft) above sea level.
