= Muradbəyli, Sabirabad =

Muradbəyli
- Municipality
- Location within Azerbaijan
- Coordinates: 40°02′19″N 48°19′14″E
- Country: Azerbaijan
- Rayon: Sabirabad

Population
  - Total: 574
- Time zone: UTC+4 (AZT)
  - Summer (DST): UTC+5 (AZT)

Muradbəyli (also, Muradbeyli) is a village and municipality in the Sabirabad Rayon of Azerbaijan. It has a population of 574.
