= Aras Dam =

Dam in Azerbaijan and Iran

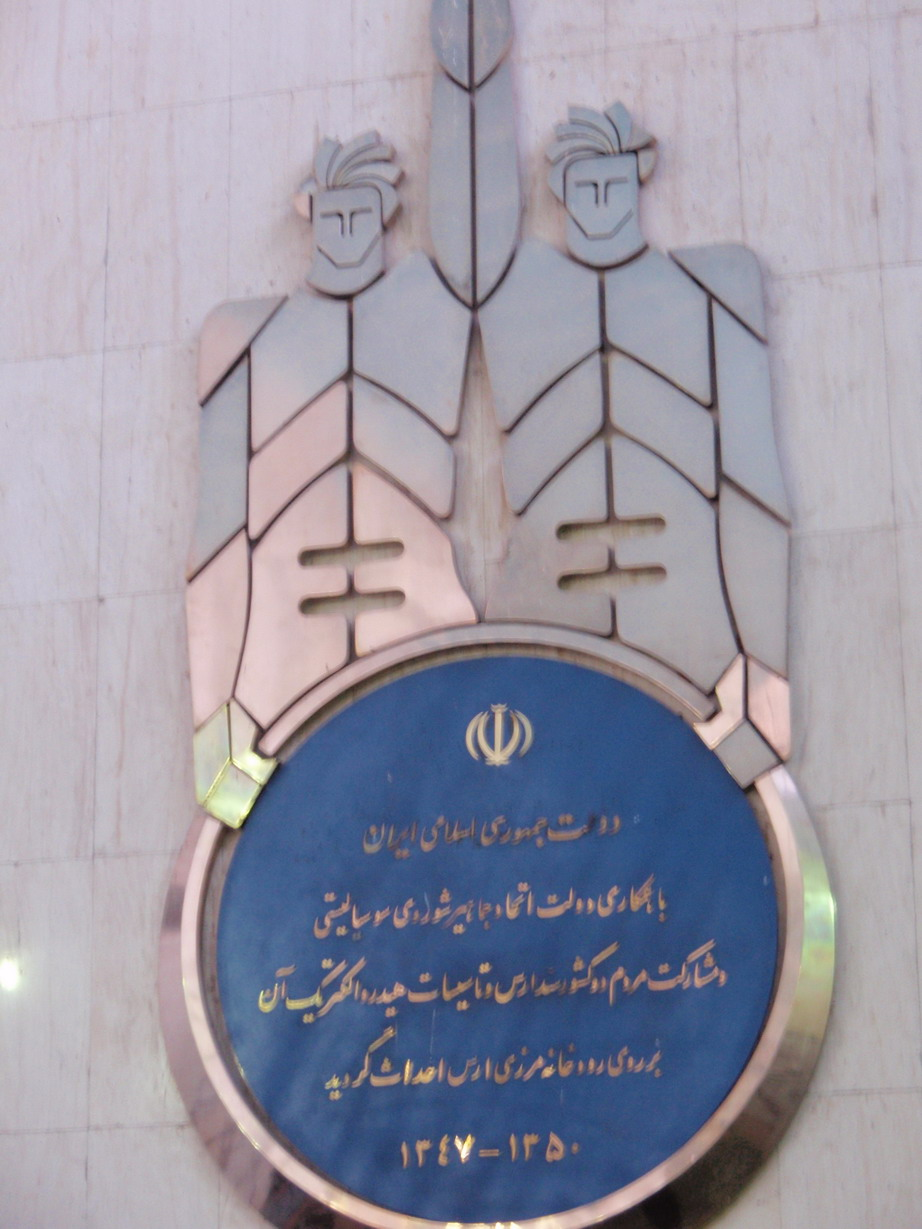
- The memorial plate of Aras dam in Jolfa
- Interactive map of Aras Dam
- Country: Iran; Azerbaijan
- Location: Poldasht, Nakhchivan
- Status: Operational
- Construction began: 1964
- Opening date: 1971

Dam and spillways
- Height: 40 m (130 ft)
- Length: 1,026 m (3,366 ft)
- Width (crest): 8 m (26 ft)
- Spillway capacity: 66.5 m^{3}/s (2,350 cu ft/s)

Reservoir
- Creates: Aras Reservoir
- Total capacity: 1.35 km^{3} (1,090,000 acre⋅ft)
- Surface area: 145 km^{2} (56 sq mi)

Power Station
- Operators: Azerenerji; Iran Water Resources Management Company
- Commission date: 1971
- Turbines: 4 × 11 MW (15,000 hp)
- Installed capacity: 44 MW (59,000 hp)

The Aras Dam (Azerbaijani: Araz su anbarı; Persian: سد ارس) is an embankment dam on the Aras River along the border of Iran and Azerbaijan. It is located downstream of Poldasht in West Azerbaijan Province, Iran and Nakhchivan City in Nakhchivan Autonomous Republic, Azerbaijan. The primary purpose of the dam is hydroelectric power generation and water supply.

== History ==
On 11 August 1957, a protocol was signed between the Soviet Union and Iran in Tehran to construct the Aras Dam on the Aras River. This was done at a time when Azerbaijan was under Soviet control. Construction on the dam began in 1963 and was completed in 1970. The dam was officially inaugurated on 28 June 1971 by Iranian deputy prime minister Safi Asfia and the Deputy Chairman of the Soviet Council of Ministers Mikhail Yefremov.

A supplementary protocol to the border agreement of 1954 between Iran and the Soviet Union was signed on 7 May 1970 in Moscow to re-delimit the border along the Aras Reservoir.

== Specifications ==
=== Dam ===
The Aras Dam is 40 metres (130 ft) tall from its foundation and 34 metres (112 ft) tall from the riverbed. It is an embankment type dam with sand fill and a clay core. It is 1,026 metres (3,366 ft) long and 8 metres (26 ft) wide on its crest.

=== Reservoir ===
The Aras Reservoir (Azerbaijani: Araz su anbarı), also known as Aras Water Junction (Azerbaijani: Araz Su Qovsağı), is a large reservoir created by the Aras Dam and shared by Nakhchivan exclave of Azerbaijan Republic and Iran.

At a normal water elevation of 777.5 metres (2,551 ft) above sea level, the dam withholds a reservoir of 1.35 cubic kilometres (1,090,000 acre⋅ft) with a surface area of 145 square kilometres (56 sq mi). Of the reservoir's normal capacity, 1.15 cubic kilometres (930,000 acre⋅ft) is active or "useful" while 0.2 cubic kilometres (160,000 acre⋅ft) is inactive or dead storage. The maximum storage of the reservoir is 1.75 cubic kilometres (1,420,000 acre⋅ft). The reservoir is 52 kilometres (32 mi) long and 6.1 kilometres (3.8 mi) wide. The average depth at normal water levels is 18.2 metres (60 ft).

There are a total of four hydroelectric stations in Azerbaijan and Iran (two on each side) with four turbines. The discharge capacity of one spillway of a station is 66.5 m^{3}/s (2,350 cu ft/s).

Since its opening, the reservoir has provided irrigation water for 400,000 hectares (990,000 acres) of arable land in Azerbaijan and Iran, including about 60,000 hectares (150,000 acres) in Dasht-e Moghan area.

=== Power station ===
The dam's power station contains four turbine-generators for a capacity of 11 megawatts (15,000 hp) each. Two of the generators are on the Iranian side and the other two on the Azerbaijani side, along with the dam's spillway. The discharge capacity of one spillway of a station is 66.5 cubic metres per second (2,350 cu ft/s). The total installed capacity is 44 MW.

== See also ==
- List of power stations in Azerbaijan
