= Kura (South Caucasus river) =

River in the Caucasus region

Kura Kür, Mtkvari (Georgian: მტკვარი)
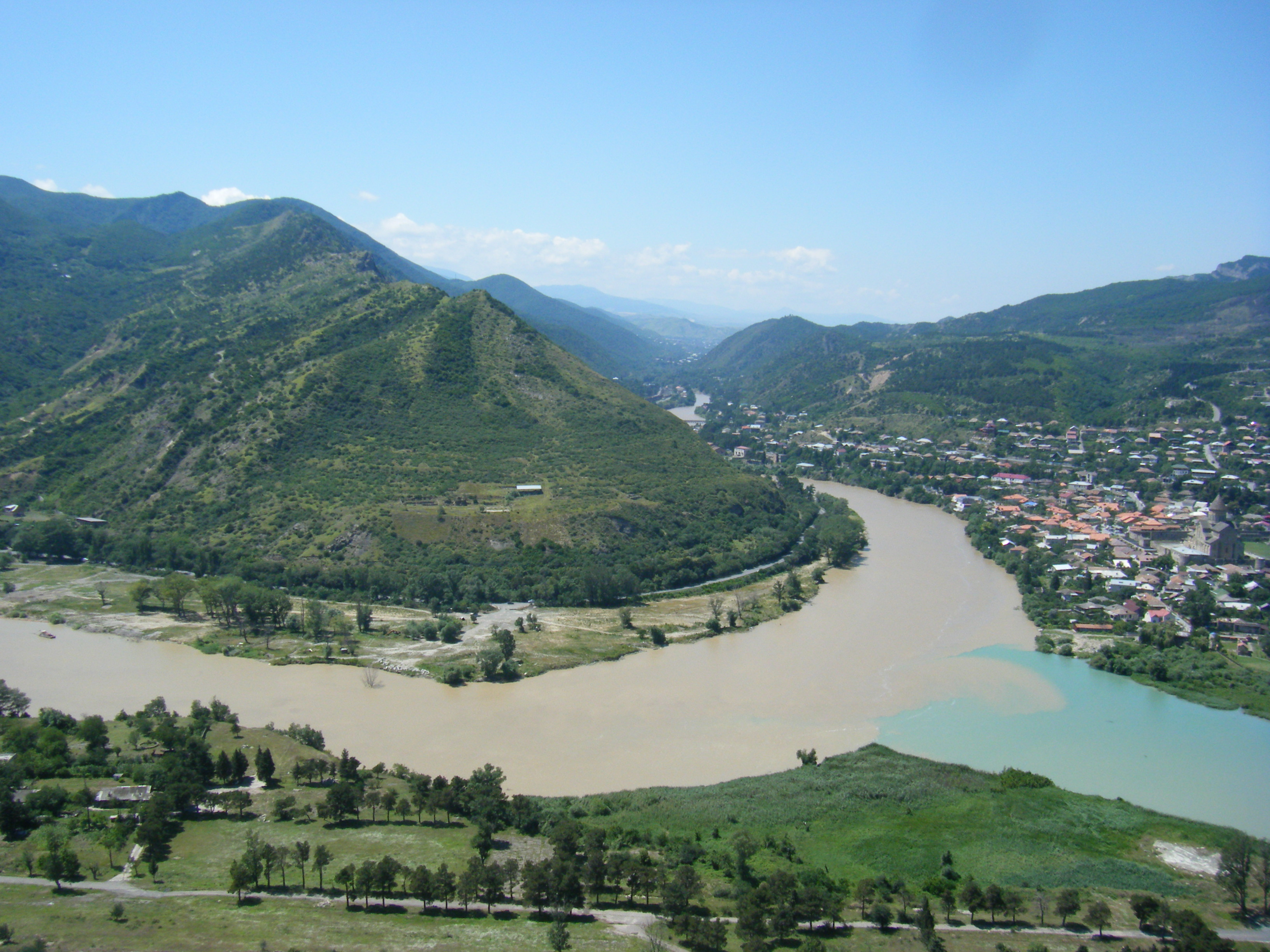
- Confluence of clay-colored waters of Kura (left) with teal-colored Aragvi (right) near Mtskheta

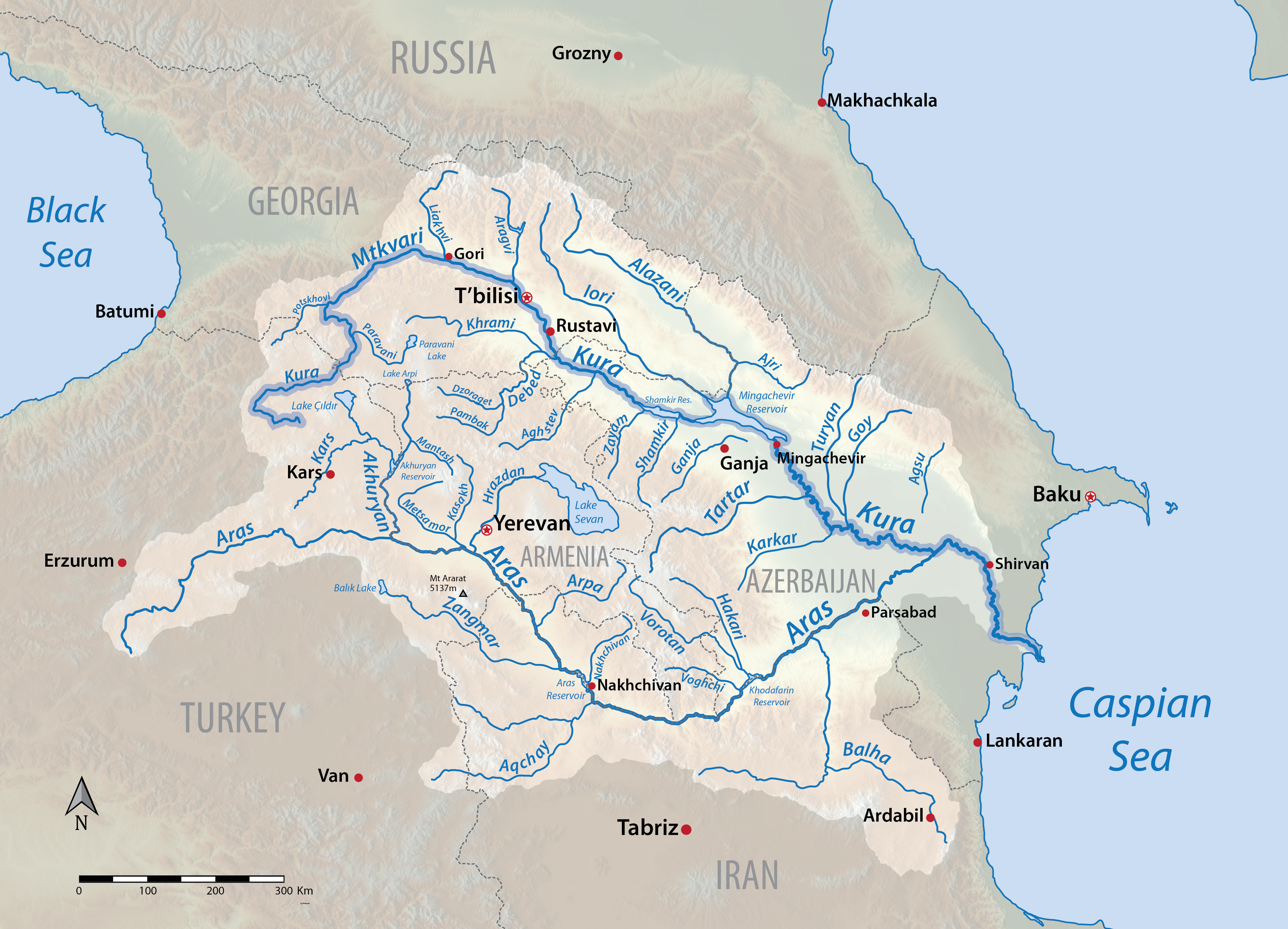
- Kura River Basin

Location
- Countries: Turkey; Georgia; Azerbaijan
- Region: Caucasus
- Cities: Khashuri; Gori; Borjomi; Tbilisi; Rustavi; Mingacevir; Zardab; Sabirabad; Neftçala

Physical characteristics
- Source: Lesser Caucasus
  - location: Near Kartsakhi Lake, Kars, Turkey
  - coordinates: 40°40′31″N 42°44′32″E
  - elevation: 2,740 m (8,990 ft)
- Mouth: Caspian Sea
  - location: Neftçala, Neftchala Rayon, Azerbaijan
  - coordinates: 39.33°N 49.40°E
  - elevation: −26.5 m (−87 ft)
- Length: 1,515 km (941 mi)
- Basin size: 198,300 km^{2} (76,600 sq mi)
- Discharge
  - location: directly downstream from Aras River confluence
  - average: 443 m^{3}/s (15,600 cu ft/s)
  - minimum: 206 m^{3}/s (7,300 cu ft/s)
  - maximum: 2,250 m^{3}/s (79,000 cu ft/s)
- Discharge
  - location: border of Georgia and Azerbaijan
  - average: 378 m^{3}/s (13,300 cu ft/s)

Basin features
- River system: Caspian Sea basin
- Tributaries
  - left: Liakhvi, Ksani, Aragvi, Iori, Alazani
  - right: Algeti, Khrami, Tartarchay, Aras

The Kura, also known in Georgian as Mtkvari (Georgian: მტკვარი, romanized: mt'k'vari [mt‘k‘ʷäɾi]), is a transboundary river that flows between the Greater Caucasus and Lesser Caucasus mountains. It drains the southern slopes of the Greater Caucasus and northern slopes of the Lesser Caucasus. Starting in northeastern Turkey, the Kura first flows north to Georgia, then southeast into Azerbaijan, where it receives the Aras as a tributary, and finally enters the Caspian Sea. The total length of the river is 1,515 kilometres (941 mi).

People have inhabited the Caucasus region for thousands of years and first established agriculture in the Kura Valley over 4,500 years ago. Large, complex civilizations eventually grew on the river, but by 1200 CE most were reduced to ruin by natural disasters and foreign invaders. The increasing human use, and eventual damage, of the watershed's forests and grasslands, contributed to a rising intensity of floods through the 20th century. In the 1950s, the Soviet Union started building many dams and canals on the river. Previously navigable up to Tbilisi in Georgia, the Kura is now much slower and shallower, having been harnessed by irrigation projects and hydroelectric power stations. The river is now moderately polluted by major industrial centers like Tbilisi and Rustavi in Georgia.

== Etymology ==
The name Kura is related either to Mingrelian kur 'water, river' or to an ancient Caucasian Albanian language Udin language term for 'reservoir' or river. The Georgian name of Kura is Mt'k'vari (in old Georgian Mt'k'uari), either from Georgian "good water" or a Georgianized form of Mingrelian tkvar-ua "gnaw" (as in, "river that eats its way through the mountains"). The name Kura was adopted first by the Russians and later by European cartographers. In some definitions of Europe, the Kura defines the borderline between Europe and Asia.

In the various regional languages, the river is known as: Azerbaijani: Kür, Georgian: მტკვარი, Mt’k’vari, Persian: Korr, Armenian: Կուր, Kour, and Turkish: Kür. In Greek and Latin sources of antiquity, the river was known as the Cyrus river; Ancient Greek: Κῦρος; Latin: Cyrus, as attested by Strabo and Pliny respectively. Bundahishn, a Zoroastrian source written in Book Pahlavi, refers to the river as Tord in Persian.

The river should not be confused with the Kura river in Russia, a westward flowing tributary of the Malka in Stavropol Krai; the Kur near Kursk, Russia; Kur near Khabarovsk, also in Russia and Kor River, which is located in Fars province, Iran.

== Course ==
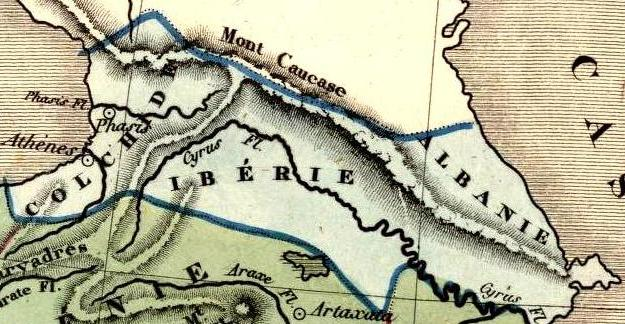
Old map showing the drainage south of the Caucasus split between the Phasis on the west and the Kura on the east

It rises in northeastern Turkey in a small valley in the Kars Upland of the Lesser Caucasus. It flows west, then north and east past Ardahan, and crosses into Georgia. It arcs to the northwest, then into a canyon near Akhaltsikhe where it starts to run northeast in a gorge for about 75 kilometres (47 mi), spilling out of the mountains near Khashuri. It then arcs east before flowing east-southeast for about 120 kilometres (75 mi), past Gori, then near Mtskheta, flows south through a short canyon and along the west side of T'bilisi, the largest city in the region. The river flows steeply southeast past Rustavi and turns eastward at its confluence with the Khrami, crossing the Georgia-Azerbaijan border and flowing across grasslands into Shemkir reservoir and then Yenikend reservoir.

The Kura then empties into Mingachevir reservoir, the largest body of water in Azerbaijan, formed by a dam near its namesake town at the southeastern end. The rivers Iori (also known as Qabirri) and Alazani formerly joined the Kura, but their mouths are now submerged under the lake. After leaving the dam, the river meanders southeast where it meets its biggest tributary Tartarchay in Barda Rayon and continues across a broad irrigated plain for several hundred kilometers, turning east near Lake Sarysu, and shortly after, receives the Aras, the largest tributary, at the city of Sabirabad. At the Aras confluence it makes a large arc to the north and then flows almost due south for about 60 kilometres (37 mi), passing the west side of Shirvan National Park, before turning east and emptying into the Caspian Sea at Neftçala.

== Basin ==
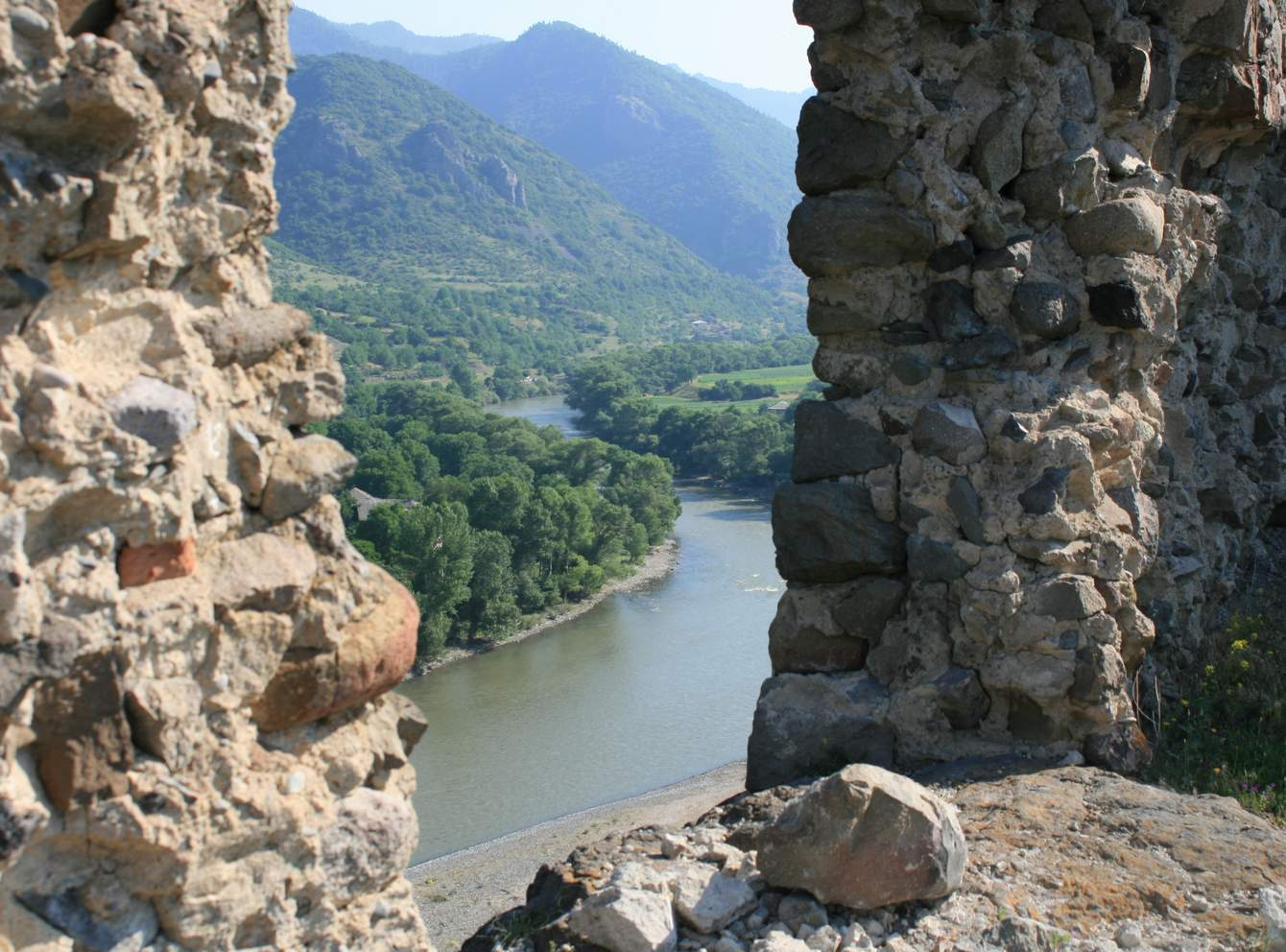
Kura making its way through mountains, as viewed from the walls of Atskuri Fortress in Georgia.

Most of the Kura runs in the broad and deep valley between the Greater Caucasus and Lesser Caucasus Mountains, and the major tributary, the Aras, drains most of the southern Caucasus and the mountain ranges of the extreme northern Middle East. The entirety of Armenia and most of Azerbaijan are drained by the river. Most of the elevation change in the river occurs within the first 200 kilometres (120 mi). While the river starts at 2,740 metres (8,990 ft) above sea level, the elevation is 693 metres (2,274 ft) by the time it reaches Khashuri in central Georgia, just out of the mountains, and only 291 metres (955 ft) when it reaches Azerbaijan.

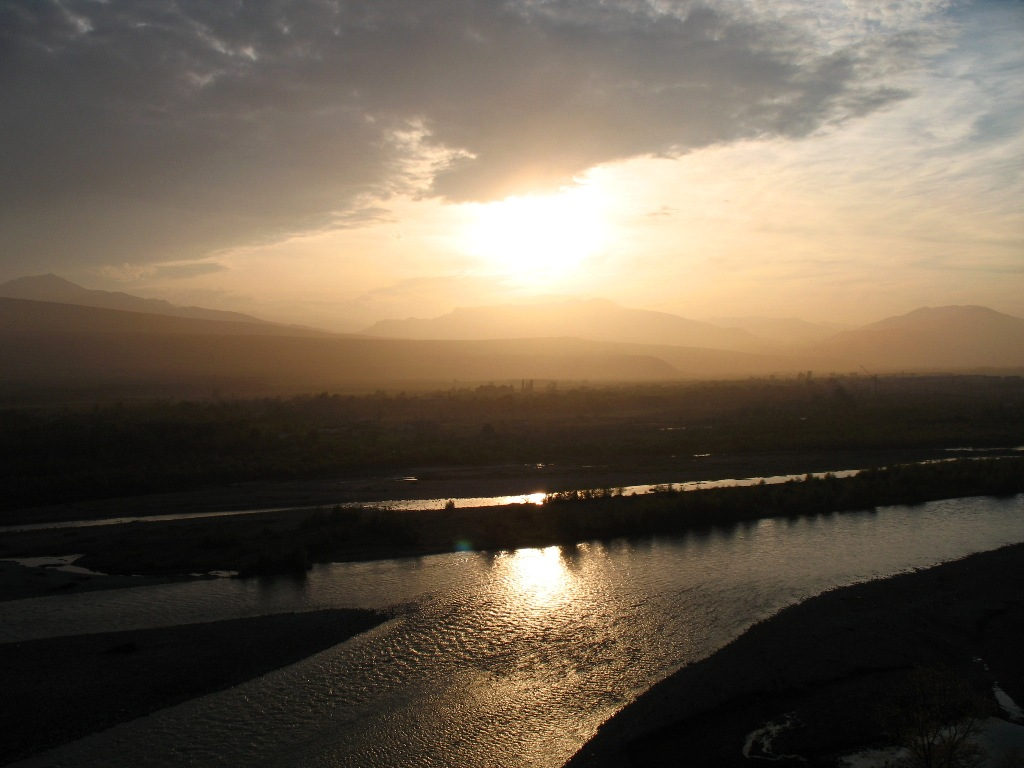
The Kura (Mtkvari) near Gori, Georgia

The lower part of the river flows through the Kura-Aras Lowland, which covers most of central Azerbaijan and abuts the Caspian Sea. The Kura is the third largest, after the Volga and Ural, of the rivers that flow into the Caspian. Its delta is the fourth largest among the rivers that flow into the Caspian Sea, and is divided into three main sections, or "sleeves", composed of sediment the river deposited during different periods of time. Before 1998, the river flowed all the way to the tip of the delta, where it discharged into the Caspian. In that year, the river escaped its channel and started to flow off to the west, leaving the last few kilometers abandoned. The course change is believed to be the result of a rise in the level of the Caspian Sea coupled with a major flood of the Kura.

About 174 kilometres (108 mi) of the river is in Turkey, 435 kilometres (270 mi) in Georgia, and 906 kilometres (563 mi) in Azerbaijan. About 5,500 square kilometres (2,100 sq mi) of the catchment is in Turkey, 29,743 square kilometres (11,484 sq mi) in Armenia, 46,237 square kilometres (17,852 sq mi) in Georgia, 56,290 square kilometres (21,730 sq mi) in Azerbaijan, and about 63,500 square kilometres (24,500 sq mi) are in Iran. At the confluence with the Aras River, the drainage area of the tributary is actually larger than the Kura by about 4%, and it is also longer. However, because of the more arid conditions and equally intensive water use, the discharge of the Aras is much less than the Kura, so downstream of the confluence the river is still called the Kura. About 52% of the river's flow comes from snowmelt and glaciers, 30% comes from groundwater seepage, and roughly 18% from precipitation. Because of high water use, many of the smaller tributaries of the Kura no longer reach the river, instead disappearing in the plain many kilometers from their original mouths.

=== Tributaries ===
The following rivers are tributaries of the Kura, from source to mouth:

- Aghstafa (right)
- Alazani (left)
- Algeti (right)
- Aragvi (left)
- Aras (right)
- Girdymanchay (left)
- Great Liakhvi (left)
- Iori (left)
- Khrami (right)
- Ksani (left)
- Kurekchay (right)
- Paravani (right)
- Qarqarçay (right)
- Shamkirchay (right)
- Tartar (right)
- Tedzami (right)
- Turyan (left)
- Vere (right)

== Ecology ==
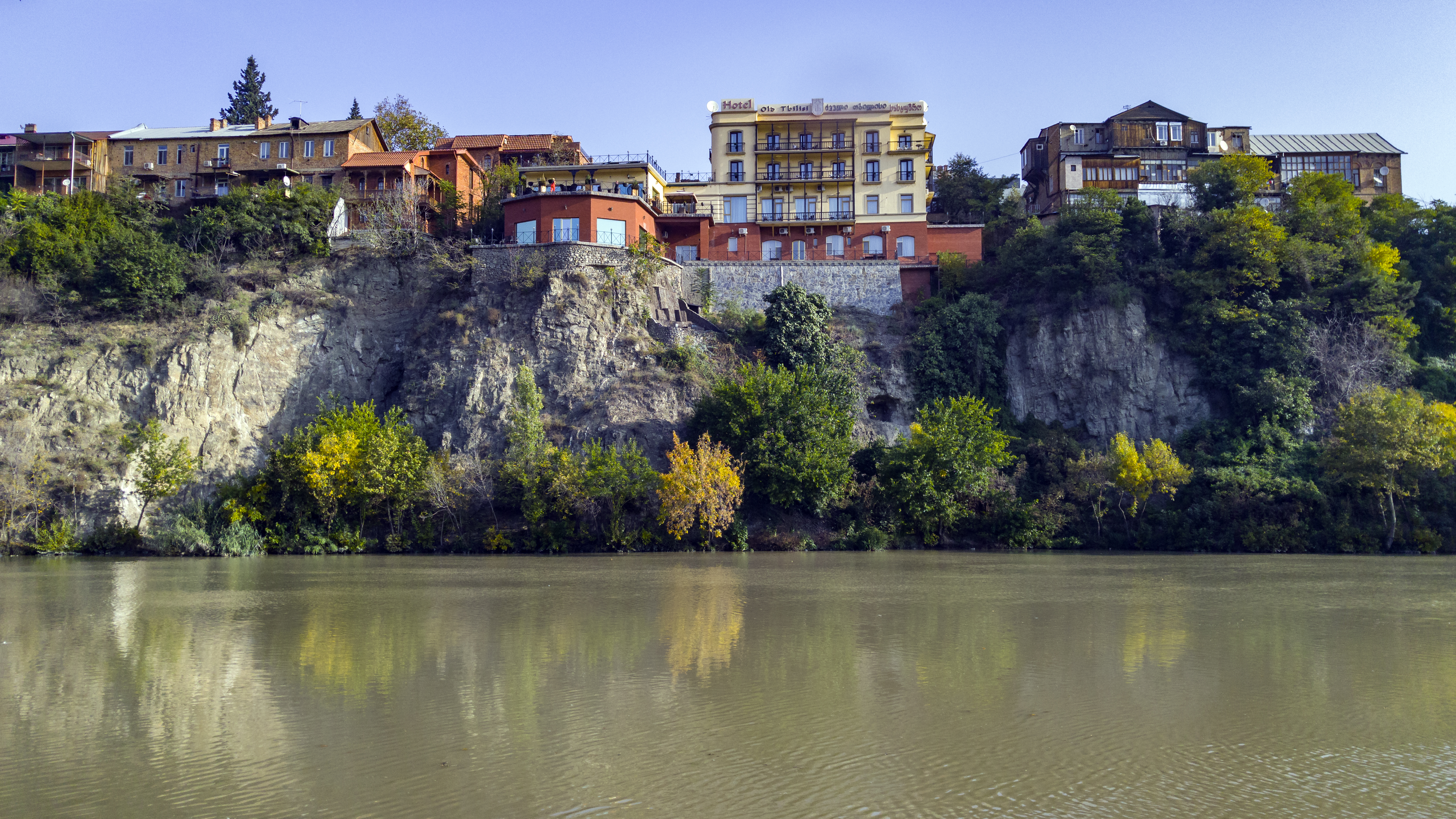
The Kura flowing along the Metekhi neighborhood of Tbilisi, Georgia

Steppe characterizes the arid reaches of the Kura catchment, while meadows are often found in the alpine areas. The Kura catchment area is considered as part of the Kura-South Caspian Sea Drainages ecoregion. Some portions of the river flow through a semi-desert environment. Forest cover is sparse. Almost 60 species of fish inhabit the Kura and its tributaries. Some common families include loach, bleak, trout and nase, and many of these fish are endemic to the region. Among rivers of the Caucasus, the Kura has the largest number of endemic species. The upper section of the river supports much more biodiversity than the lower half, which is typically more turbid and polluted. This pattern is also apparent in most of its tributaries, especially the larger ones that span more climate zones, such as the Aras and Alazani. There are many lakes and wetlands along the Kura's lower course, most of which are formed by flooding, and some of which are formed by irrigation runoff water. Many lakes also form at the mouths of small tributaries that do not reach the ultimate destination in the Caspian most of the time. The local name for these lakes translate to dead lake or dead water, suggesting that these lakes do not support much biodiversity.

== Economy and human use ==
Formerly navigable up to Tbilisi, the largest city on the river, the amount of water in the Kura has greatly diminished in the 20th century because of extensive use for irrigation, municipal water, and hydroelectricity generation. The Kura is regarded as one of the most stressed river basins in Asia. Most of the water comes from snowmelt and infrequent precipitation in the mountains, which leads to severe floods and an abundance of water for a short time of the year (generally in June and July), and a relatively low sustainable baseflow. Forest cover is sparse, especially in the Kura and Aras headwaters, and most of the water that falls on the highlands becomes runoff instead of supplying groundwater. Attempts at flood control include the constructions of levees, dikes and dams, the largest of which is at Mingachevir, an 80-metre (260 ft)-high rockfill dam impounding over 15.73 cubic kilometres (12,750,000 acre⋅ft) of water. However, because of the high sediment content of rivers in the Kura basin, the effectiveness of these floodworks is limited and decreases every year.

Irrigation agriculture has been one of the primary economic mainstays of the lower Kura valley since ancient times. Because of water taken out for irrigation use, up to 20% of the water that formerly flowed in the river no longer reaches the Caspian Sea. Over 70% of the water in the Iori (Gabirry) River, a major tributary of the Kura, is expended before it reaches Lake Mingachevir. Of the 4,525,000 hectares (11,180,000 acres) of agricultural land in the lower Kura catchment area, 1,426,000 hectares (3,520,000 acres), about 31%, are irrigated. Much of the water diverted from the river for irrigation goes to waste because of leakage from the canals, evaporation, poor maintenance, and other causes. Leaking water causes groundwater to rise, in some areas so high that about 267,000 hectares (660,000 acres) of land are so waterlogged that they are no longer suitable for agriculture. About 631,000 hectares (1,560,000 acres) of the irrigated lands have a dangerously high salt content because of mineral deposits from irrigation. Of this, 66,000 hectares (160,000 acres) are extremely salinated. Irrigation returns water, returned to the river by an extensive but outdated drainage system, contributes to severe pollution. Some of this degradation also comes from industrial and municipal wastewater discharge.

== History ==
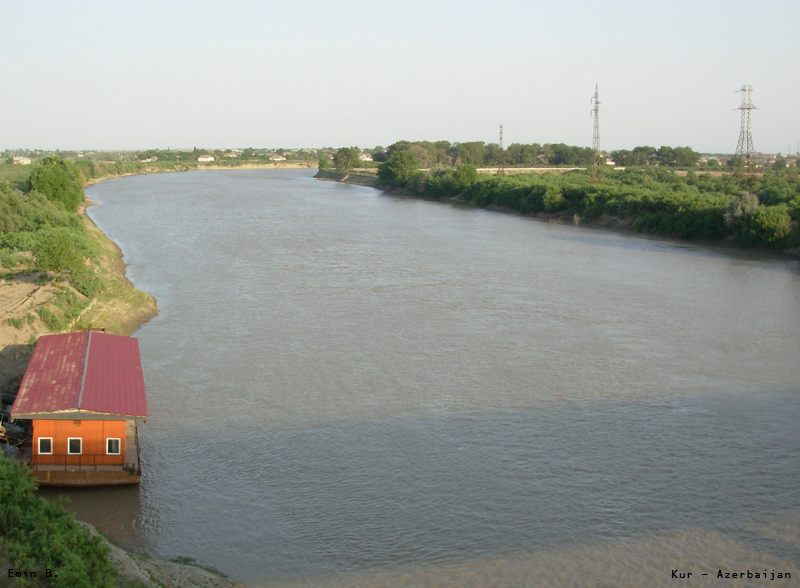
Kura in Azerbaijan

The ancient inhabitants of the Kura-Aras lowland called the river Mother Kür, signifying the importance of the river to the region. The first irrigation agriculture began about 4,500 years ago in the eastern Azerbaijan lowlands. Trading centers were established in time, including one at Mingachevir in Azerbaijan and another at Mtskheta in Georgia.

The site at Mingachevir (probably Sudagylan), first discovered in the 1940s by archaeologist G. I. Ione, had "seven rectangular kilns ... The fuel chamber was a trapezoid. The inner walls and floor were covered with a special coating. These kilns were attributed to the third century B.C. [2,300 years ago]. The number of kilns and the quantity of raw material indicate a trade center." The settlement was probably destroyed by a fire around A.D. 600, but its demise is uncertain. But perhaps the most famous of the ancient settlements on the Kura is the "cave town" at Uplistsikhe, Georgia, first settled as early as 3,500 years ago. The city, carved into a cliff on the bank of the Kura covering an area of 8 hectares (20 acres), contains underground living quarters, communal chambers, places of worship, storerooms, connected by a network of passageways. It reached its peak about 1,100 years ago as the political, religious and cultural center of the region, but in the 13th century, it fell to Mongolian invaders.

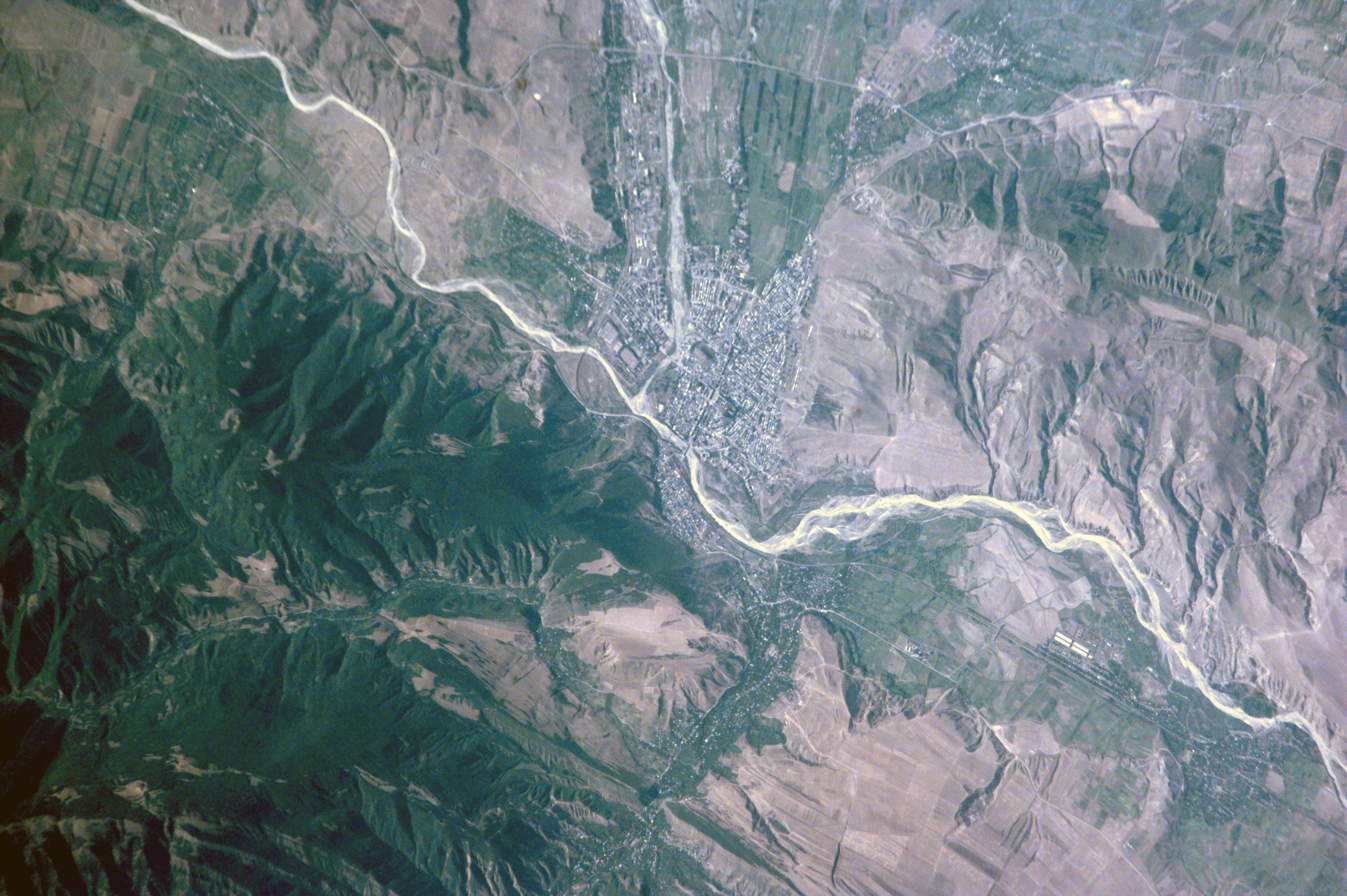
Kura (Mtkvari) near Gori, Georgia

Even though irrigation agriculture had been well established for thousands of years, until the 1920s, humans did not have a significant effect on the ecology or hydrology of the Kura catchment area. Since then, logging, grazing and especially agriculture began to have a severe outcome on the water availability of the basin. Many forested areas in the mountains have been replaced by thin grassland because of logging. These habitat changes have been detrimental to the ecology of the Kura basin. After the 1920s, wetlands were drained and reservoirs were created to facilitate development of irrigation in the lower Kura valley.

In the 1950s and 1960s, when the Caucasus region was part of the Soviet Union, construction of many of the reservoirs and waterworks in the Kura basin began. Of the major reservoirs in the Kura catchment, one of the earliest was at Varvara in 1952. Large-scale construction of dams continued until the 1970s.

== See also ==
- Rivers and lakes in Azerbaijan
- List of rivers of Georgia (country)
