= Shamkir reservoir =

- Location within Azerbaijan
- Location: Shamkir Rayon, Azerbaijan
- Coordinates: 40°59′24″N 45°59′26″E
- Type: reservoir
- Primary inflows: Kura River
- Primary outflows: Kura River
- Basin countries: Azerbaijan
- Max. length: 4.5 km (2.8 mi)
- Surface area: 116 km^{2} (45 sq mi)
- Average depth: 18.2 m (60 ft)
- Water volume: 2,677 million cubic metres (2.170×10^{6} acre⋅ft)

The Shamkir reservoir (Azerbaijani: Şəmkir su anbarı) is a large reservoir built on the Kura River in the Shamkir Rayon of northwestern Azerbaijan. It is the second-largest reservoir in the Caucasus after the Mingachevir reservoir, also in northwestern Azerbaijan.

== Overview ==
The Shamkir reservoir was built on the Shamkir section of the Kura River in 1982. The area of the Shamkir reservoir is 116 km^{2} (45 sq mi). The overall volume of the reservoir is 2,677 million m^{3} and the exploited volume of water is 1,425 million m^{3}. The normal water level of the reservoir is 158 m (518 ft) and the surface area is 115 km^{2} (44 sq mi). Its dam top length is 4,500 m (14,800 ft) and height is 70 m (230 ft). The reservoir provides irrigation water to 46,000 ha (110,000 acres) of land in Shamkir, Samukh, Goygol and Goranboy rayons. A 380 megawatt hydroelectric power station with 2 turbines is a part of the reservoir complex.

== New Shamkir reservoir ==
A new reservoir in Shamkir Rayon was completed in 2014 by the Azerbaijani government on the Shamkirchay river. The main purpose of the new reservoir is to provide irrigation water to Shamkir, Samukh Goygol and Goranboy rayons. The project was initiated by the President of Azerbaijan, Ilham Aliyev, in 2009 at a cost of $400 million. The construction of the reservoir and dam was to last three years. Over 50 pieces of heavy machinery and 240 laborers are currently involved in construction. According to experts, about 50,000 ha (120,000 acres) of land will be irrigated with the water from the new reservoir. The reservoir will have a volume capacity of 160 million m^{3} and an average water flow of 260 million m^{3}, and will also provide more drinking water to the city of Shamkir. The maximum length at the new reservoir will be 122 m (400 ft). The top length of the dam will be 692 m (2,270 ft), width - 12 m (39 ft). Over 85,000 m^{3} of concrete and 7,000 metal structures and fittings will be used for construction of the dam. Also, a 36 megawatt hydroelectric power station will be built at the reservoir. The annual energy production of the station will be 56 million kWh. The construction is being carried out by a Turkish company.

== See also ==
- Rivers and lakes in Azerbaijan
- Mil-Mughan reservoir
