= Mingachevir reservoir =

Reservoir on the Kura river in Azerbaijan

Mingachevir Reservoir
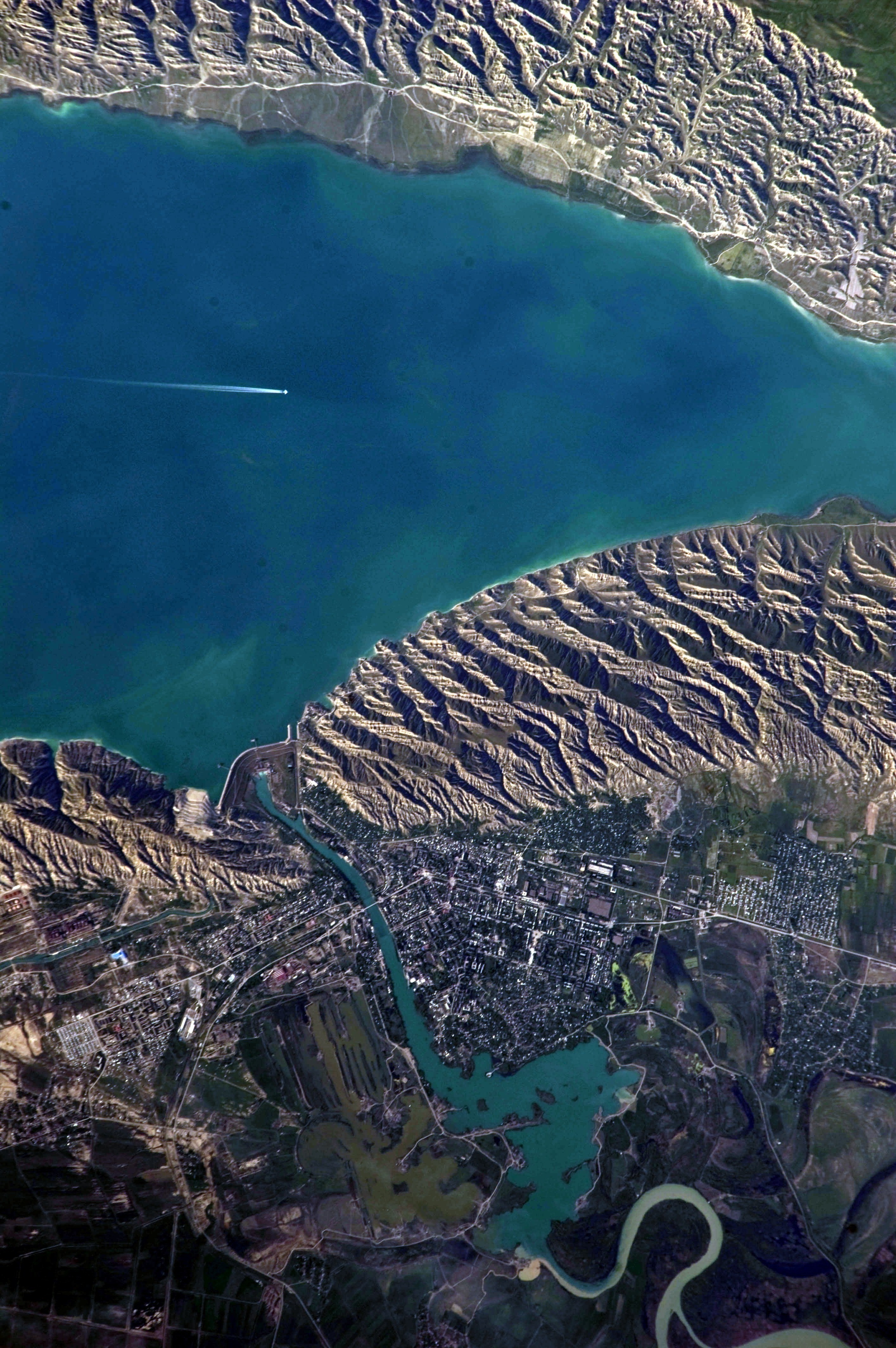
- Mingachevir Reservoir

- Location within Azerbaijan
- Location: Samukh District and Yevlakh District
- Coordinates: 40°47′20″N 47°01′40″E
- Type: reservoir
- Primary inflows: Kura River, Alazani, Iori/Qabırlı
- Primary outflows: Kura River
- Basin countries: Azerbaijan
- Built: 1953
- Max. length: 70 km (43 mi)
- Max. width: 18 km (11 mi)
- Surface area: 605 km^{2} (234 sq mi)
- Average depth: 26 m (85 ft)
- Max. depth: 75 m (246 ft)
- Water volume: 15.730 km^{3} (12,753,000 acre⋅ft)
- Shore length^{1}: 247 km (153 mi)
- ^{1} Shore length is not a well-defined measure.

The Mingachevir Reservoir (Azerbaijani: Mingəçevir su anbarı) (also known as the Mingachevir Sea (Azerbaijani: Mingəçevir dənizi)) is a large reservoir on the Kura river in northwestern Azerbaijan. It supplies water to the Upper Karabakh and Upper Shirvan channels, and is used for electricity generation, irrigation water supply, and fishing.

== Overview ==
The Mingachevir Reservoir is the largest reservoir in the Caucasus, having a length of 70 km (43 mi), a width of 18 km (11 mi), maximum depth of 75 m (246 ft), average depth of 26 m (85 ft), maximum volume of 15.73 km^{3}, shoreline length of 247 km (153 mi), and overall area of 605 km^{2} (234 sq mi).

The reservoir's water level is maintained by the dam of the Mingachevir Hydro Power Plant, built near Mount Bozdağ from 1945 to 1953. It is the largest hydroelectric power station of Azerbaijan, with an installed electric capacity of 401.6 megawatts. Its dam has a length of 1,550 m (5,090 ft), a width of 16 m (52 ft), and a height of 80 m (260 ft).

The reservoir's initial filling lasted from 1953 to 1959, and was refilled to maximum capacity in 1963, 1968, 1973, 1975, 1976, 1978, 1988, and 2010.

== Orographic description ==
Cliffs are particular for both banks of the river Kura, and they are also observed where the river flows into Mingachevir reservoir. However, sandy-clayey sediments belonging to the Paleogene-Neogene are widespread in the area of the reservoir. At the edges of the Mingachevir reservoir, landslide processes occur periodically.

== As a possible military target ==
Within the context of the Nagorno-Karabakh conflict, scholars and politicians have speculated the possibility of the Mingachevir reservoir being used as a military target by Armenian forces. Russian ethnographer Sergey Arutyunov stated in a 2010 interview:

I will not disclose a military secret—this has been openly admitted in Armenia's general staff—that Armenian or NKR artillery batteries, stationed at the top of Karabakh mountains, are 40 kilometers away from the Mingachevir reservoir. One strike and central Azerbaijan will turn into a sea.

In the aftermath of the 2014 Armenian–Azerbaijani clashes, Armenia's Defense Minister Seyran Ohanyan stated at the government session on August 7 that the Troops of the Civil Defense of the Azerbaijani Ministry of Emergency Situations have recently been mainly protecting the Mingachevir Hydro Power Plant fearing an attack by the Armenian forces. In response, the Azerbaijani Defense Ministry issued a statement the next day which said that "the Armenian people should know that the response to any sabotage attempts against Mingachevir Hydro Power Plant from the Armenian side will be more miserable" and cautioned that Azerbaijan had the capability to raze Yerevan, Armenia's capital.

Telman Zeynalov, president of the National Center of Environmental Forecasting, said in an interview that the entire area from Arran (i.e. the great triangle of land, lowland in the east but rising to mountains in the west, formed by the junction of the rivers Kura and Aras) to Baku, the Azerbaijani capital, would be flooded if Mingachevir Dam was destroyed. In his words, it would lead to a "large-scale environmental disaster." Zeynalov added that the Armenian side should be cautious because the flooding "would affect both sides" and most of Armenian-occupied Karabakh would also be flooded. The latter claim was rejected by Armenian analyst Hrant Melik-Shahnazaryan who stated that the waters of the Mingachevir reservoir cannot possibly reach the highlands of Karabakh.

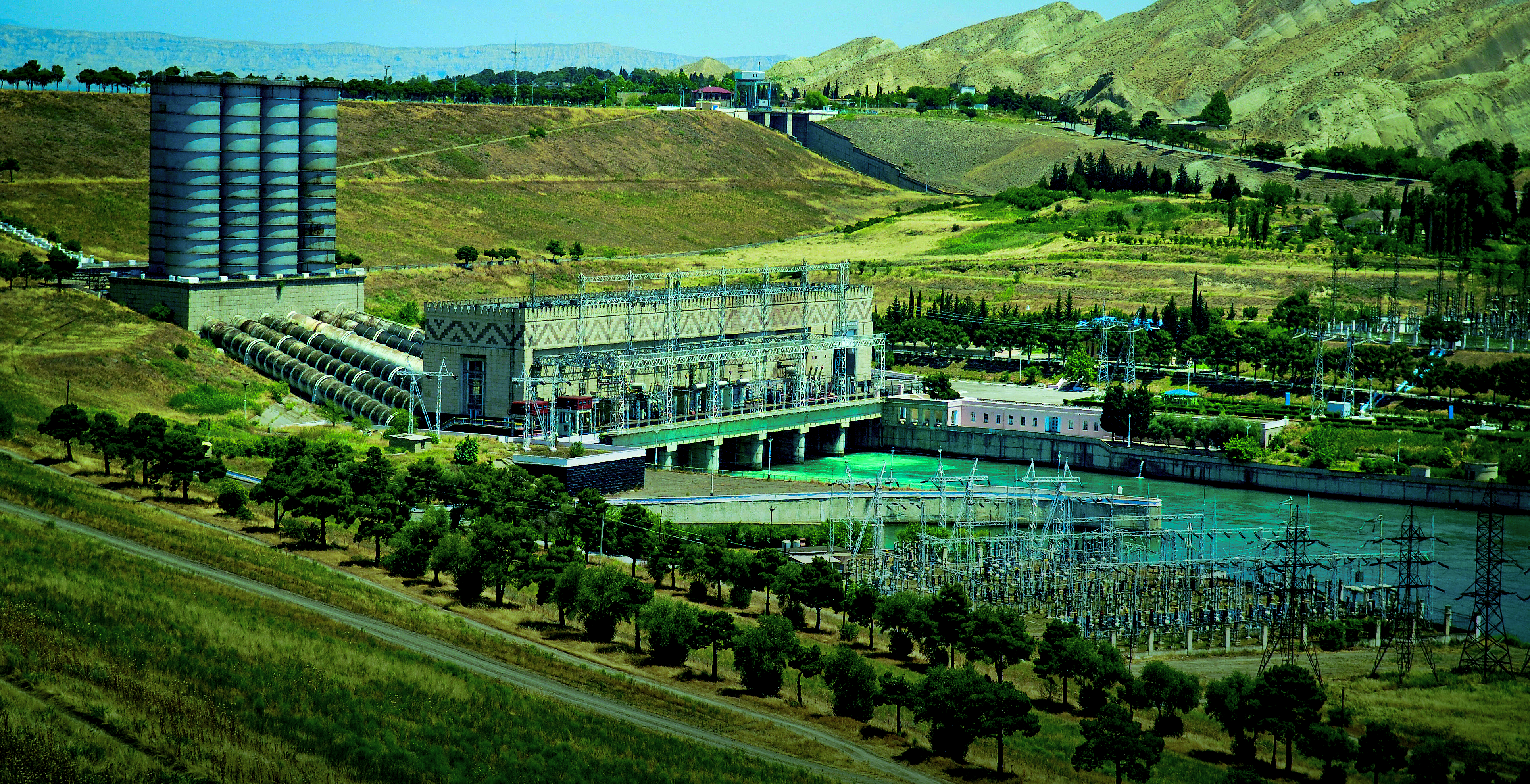
Mingachevir reservoir

Armenia's former defense minister Vagharshak Harutiunyan mentioned attacking the reservoir dam in a July 2020 interview.

Vagif Dargahli, spokesperson of Azerbaijan's Ministry of Defense stated in July 2020 that the "land topography of the Mingachevir water reservoir, protective land works in the area and advanced air defense systems in service with the country’s missile defense troops make a strike on this strategically important facility impossible."

== See also ==
- Rivers and lakes in Azerbaijan
- Shamkir reservoir
