= 8 November Power Station =

Oil-fired power plant in Mingachevir, Azerbaijan

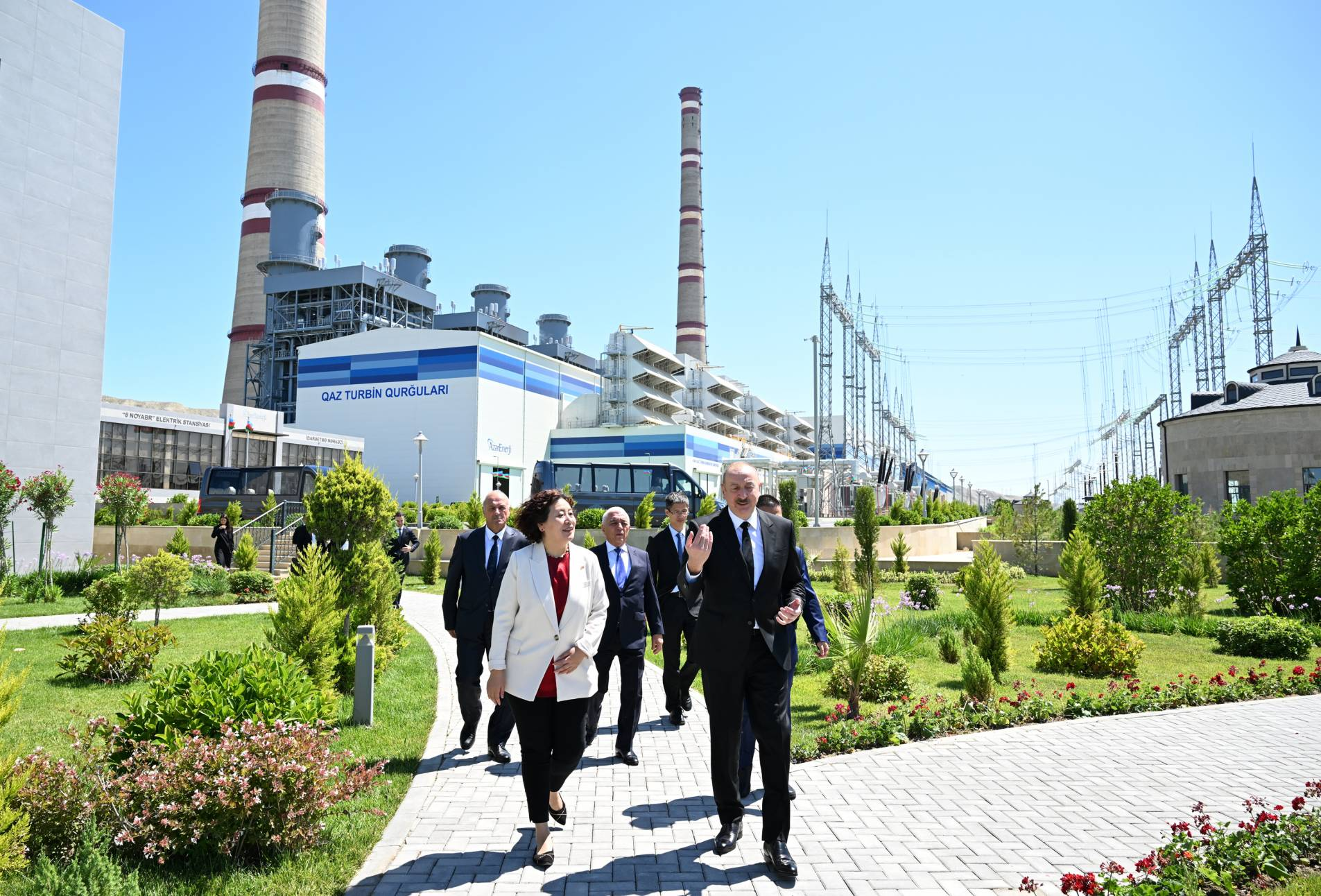
- Official name: "8 Noyabr" Elektrik Stansiyası
- Country: Azerbaijan
- Location: Mingachevir, Azerbaijan
- Coordinates: 40°46′46″N 46°59′11″E
- Status: Operational
- Construction began: 13 February 2023
- Commission date: 24 June 2025
- Owner: Azerenerji JSC
- Operator: Azerenerji JSC

Power generation
- Nameplate capacity: 1880 MW

External links
- Commons: Related media on Commons

8 November Power Station (Azerbaijani: "8 Noyabr" Elektrik Stansiyası) is a thermal power station in Azerbaijan, located in Mingachevir on the territory of the Azerbaijan Thermal Power Plant. The plant was commissioned on 24 June 2025.

== Background and construction ==
A decision to build the largest power station of the independence period at the site of the Azerbaijan Thermal Power Plant in Mingachevir was taken by presidential order dated 25 October 2022.

Construction began on 13 February 2023. The project was prepared by Azerenerji JSC.

The plant's construction was carried out by local companies; technical supervision was provided by AFRY, and design services were provided by the Spanish company IDOM. Gas turbines and generators were supplied by Ansaldo Energia (Italy).

Waste-heat boilers and transformer units were supplied by Dongfang Electric Corporation (China). The station was integrated with a SCADA control system.

== Design and capacity ==
The power station includes four 320 MW gas turbines, four generators, four waste-heat boilers, and four transformer units.

Its initial capacity is 1280 MW; through waste-heat utilization (conversion of exhaust gas heat into steam), the total installed capacity reaches 1880 MW.

Annual electricity generation is stated as 12.5 billion kWh, and the plant is expected to enable savings of 0.8–1.2 billion cubic metres of gas per year.

== Commissioning ==
The station was commissioned on 24 June 2025. The inauguration ceremony was held with the participation of President Ilham Aliyev and Italy's Minister of Business and Made in Italy, Adolfo Urso.

== See also ==
- List of power stations in Azerbaijan
- Energy in Azerbaijan
