= List of power stations in Azerbaijan =

The following page lists all power stations in Azerbaijan.

== Renewable energy ==
=== Hydroelectric power stations in Azerbaijan ===
Power station	Town	Coordinates	Capacity (MW)	Year	Notes
Mingachevir Hydroelectric Power Station	Mingachevir	40.79°N 47.028333°E	424	1953	
Shamkir Hydroelectric Power Station	Shamkir	40.947038°N 46.171074°E	380	1982	
Yenikend Hydroelectric Power Station	Yenikend	40.919167°N 46.282778°E	150	2000	
Khoda Afarin Hydroelectric Power Station	Soltanli	39.159722°N 46.934722°E	102	2008	Exploited by Iran
Sarsang Hydroelectric Power Station	Sarsang	40.2076°N 46.6507°E	50	1976	
Fuzuli Hydroelectric Power Station	Fuzuli	39°59′ N 47°14′ E	25.2	2012	
Tahtakorpu Hydroelectric Power Station	Shabran	41.16402°N 48.989958°E	25	2013	
Şəmkirçay Hydroelectric Power Station	Shamkir	40°59′24″ N 45°59′26″ E	25	1982	
Biləv Hydroelectric Power Station	Ordubad	38.9°N 46.033333°E	22	2010	
Aras Hydroelectric Power Station	Araz	39.091111°N 45.402222°E	22	1974	Other half exploited by Iran
Apachay-1 Hydroelectric Power Station	Sharur	39°29′10″ N 45°09′17″ E	20.5	2014	
Varvara Hydroelectric Power Station	Yevlakh, Mingachevir, Goygol	40°41'7" N 47°5'35" E	16.5	1956	
Güləbird Hydroelectric Power Station	Lachin		8	2021	
Sugovushan-1 and -2	Tartar		7.8	2021	
Vayxır Hydroelectric Power Station	Babek	40.1°N 47.75°E	5	2006	
Kelbajar-1	Kalbajar		4.4	2022	
Goychay Hydroelectric Power Station	Goychay		3.1	2015	
Ismailli-1 Hydroelectric Power Station	Ismailli		1.6	2013	
Ismailli-2 Hydroelectric Power Station	Ismailli		1.6	2016	
Apachay-2 Hydroelectric Power Station	Sharur		1.4	2014	
Gusar Hydroelectric Power Station			1	2012	
Balakan-1 Hydroelectric Power Station	Balakan		0.304	2011	

=== Photovoltaic power stations ===
Station	Town	Coordinates	Capacity (MW)	Year
Naxçıvan Günəş	Babək	39.333072°N 45.461726°E	20	2015
Surakhani Solar Power Station	Surakhani	40.420278°N 50.004722°E	1.2	2014
Garadagh Solar Power Plant	Ələt	40.016602°N 49.342468°E	230	2023
Gobustan Solar Power Plant	Baku		100	2026

== Non-renewable energy ==
=== Thermal power stations ===
Station	Town	Coordinates	Capacity (MW)	Year	Constructing company
Azerbaijan	Mingachevir	40.7804°N 46.9914°E	2,400	1981	Taganrog (boiler), LMZ Russia (turbine) and Electrosila (generator)
Shirvan	Shirvan	39.931944°N 48.920278°E	1,050	1962	
Janub	Shirvan	39.931944°N 48.920278°E	780	2013	
(Sumqayit)	Sumqayit	40.589722°N 49.668611°E	525	2009	
Shimal	Baku	40.395278°N 49.882222°E	401	2002	
Sangachal	Sangachal	40.172512°N 49.461329°E	300	2008	Wärtsilä
Baku TEC	Baku	40.375648°N 49.920844°E	106	2001	
Baku	Baku	40.403260°N 49.916564°E	105	2007	
Shahdagh	Quba	48.47475°N. 41.40713° E	105	2007	Wärtsilä
Astara	Astara	48.82745°N 38.48746°E	87	2006	
Shaki	Shaki	47.14083°N 41.06081°E	87	2006	
Kachmaz	Kachmaz	48.81158°N 41.43187°E	87	2006	
Nakhichevan	Nakhichevan		87	2006	
Nakhichevan Gas Turbine	Nakhichevan		64	2006	
8 November Power Station	Mingachevir		1880	2025	Azerenerji

== See also ==
- Hydroelectric power stations in Azerbaijan
- Energy law
- List of power stations in Asia
- List of power stations in Europe
- List of largest power stations in the world
