= Hydroelectric power stations in Azerbaijan =

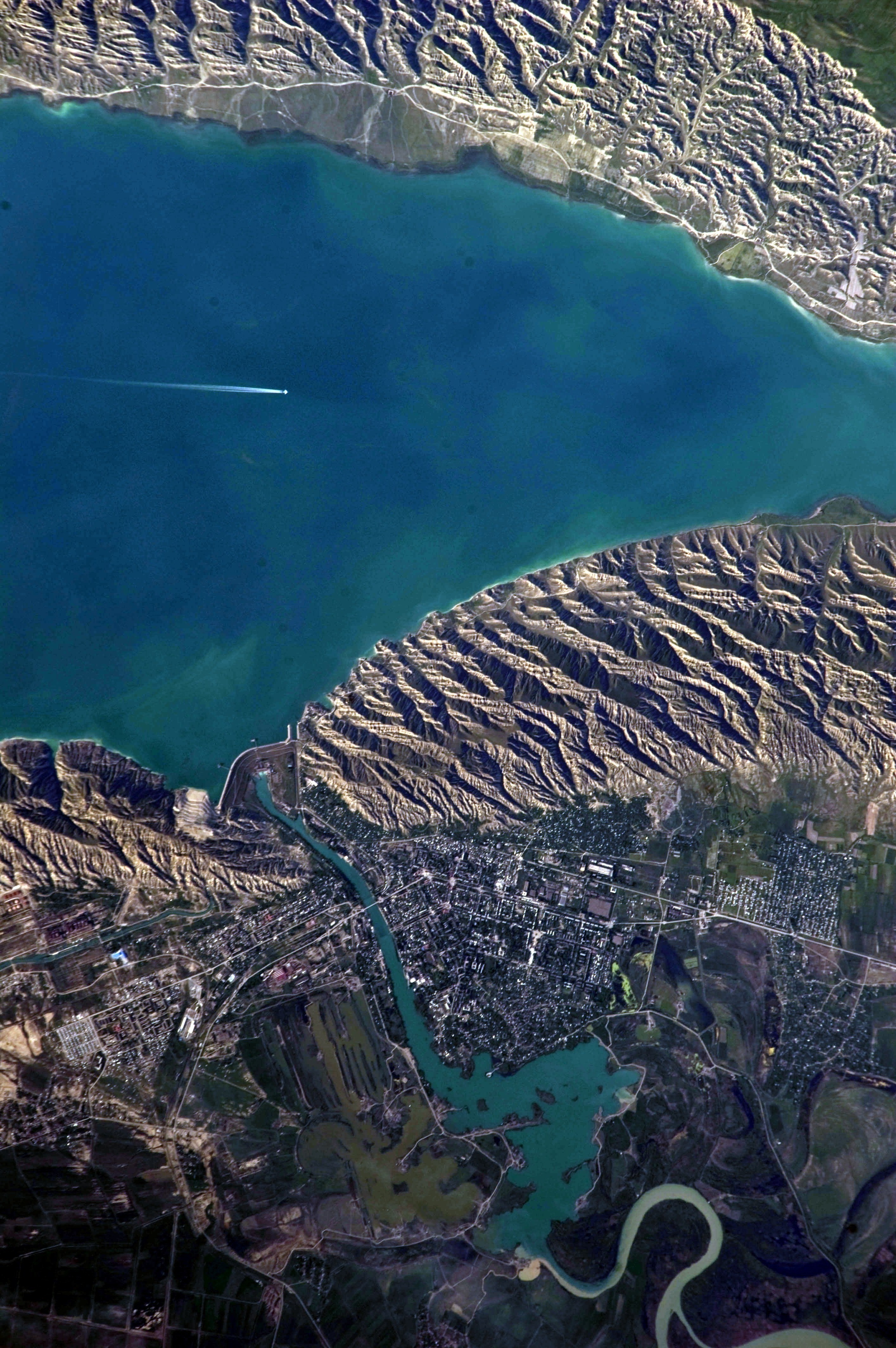
Mingachevir Reservoir, Azerbaijan

The power generation potential of the rivers in Azerbaijan is estimated at 40 billion kilowatt per hour, and feasible potential is 16 billion kilowatt per hour. Small-scale hydro has significant developmental potential in Azerbaijan. In particular, the lower reaches of the Kura river, the Aras river and other rivers flowing into the Caspian Sea. Hydropower could conceivably provide up to 30% of Azerbaijan’s electricity requirements. Currently, hydropower, dominated by large-scale dams, provides 11.4% of Azerbaijan’s electricity.

== Hydroelectric potential ==
Water is the main renewable resource contributing to the energy supply in Azerbaijan and this accounted for 18% of electricity generation in 2010. Azerbaijan has about 1000 MW of operating hydropower capacity and an additional 62 MW of planned hydropower capacity. The largest hydroelectric power plant is Mingachevir; it has an installed capacity of 402 MW and is situated on the Kura River. Furthermore, there are presently three more hydroelectric power plants with an installed capacity of more than 100 MW in Azerbaijan, all of which are situated on the Kura River. The water resources of Azerbaijan are located in the following areas:

- The lower reaches of the Kura River with its multiple tributaries;
- The Aras River (the Kura tributary), which is on the border; and
- A group of creeks flowing into the Caspian Sea.

for the rivers in Azerbaijan can go up to 40 TWh. Based on the June 2012 mission, the economically feasible potential amounts to less than 1 TWh, all of which is related to small HPPs of the river runoff type. This is equivalent to an installed capacity of about 400 MW, according to Azerenerji.

The construction of HPPs plays an important role in solving issues of flood control, the clean production of electricity and the creation of new irrigation systems. In the near future, the construction of 61 small HPPs is planned. Small HPPs are often located in settlements that are located far from the power lines and substations of the unified energy system. However, it may meet the local power needs, which may also help to solve other social problems. By the end of 2013, the plan is that 20 government-financed small HPPs will be completed with a total installed capacity of 86 MW. Azerenerji has prepared a programme of new HPPs, amounting to an installed capacity of 1.3 GW, including small HPPs. Two projects have been started to date, namely the Sheki and Mughan HPPs. There are also projects on the Yukhari Shirvan and Bash Mil irrigation canals. The United Nations Development Programme (UNDP) promoted small hydro development in Azerbaijan in the form of a project that ran from 2007-2010, which had a budget of around $1.5 million, provided by Norway.

== History ==
The construction of largest hydroelectric power station in the South Caucasus Mingachevir HPP started in 1945, the first hydro aggregate was put into operation in 1953. In 1955, the station was put into operation with full capacity.

During Soviet period Azerbaijan realized several other large-scale projects in the 1970-80s. In order to provide a certain part of electricity demand of Nakhchivan Autonomous Republic with internal resources, “Araz” hydroelectric power station with 22 MVt power was built on Araz River in 1971.

Serseng reservoir and a hydroelectric power station with 50MVt power capacity were put into operation on the Terter River in 1976-1977 for the irrigation of productive lands, to improve electricity supply of the region, to reduce wastes in the energy transmission, and develop agriculture in Garabakh. Currently, this object is in the areas which are under temporary Armenian occupation.

In the late 1970s, the electric station in the republic with the total power capacity of 2882 MVt produced electrical power of 15.4 billion KVt-hour. However, the increasing demand of the rapidly developing economy made Azerbaijan to export 2.9-3.5 billion KVt-hour electrical power from the neighboring countries. In order to fill this gap, it was decided to begin the construction of Shemkir HPS.

In the 1980s, Shemkir HES with 380 MVt power capacity were put into operation.

The construction of Yenikend water reservoir and hydroelectric power station (its construction started in 1984) huge amount of electricity has been produced within the boundaries of Azerbaijan.

== List of hydroelectric power stations ==
Name of power plant	Project capacity (MW)	Date of establishment	In Nakhchivan Autonomous Republic
Mingachevir	402	1953	
Shemkir	380	1982-1983	
Yenikend	150	23.05.2000	
Fuzuli	25	15.12.2012	
Takhtakorpu	25	28.09.2013	
Shemkirchay	25	15.11.2014	
Varvara	16	1956-157	
Ismayilli-1	1.6	14.08.2013	
Qusar-1	1	20.12.2012	
Araz	22	1970-1974	
Bilev	22	03.10.2010	X
Arpachay-1	20.5	07.04.2014	X
Vaykhir	5	20.12.2006	X
Arpachay-2	1.4	07.04.2014	X
Goychay	3.1	06.10.2015	
Güləbird	8	14.01.2021	
Ordubad Hydroelectric Power Plant	36	January 2017	X
Total			

- Takhtakorpu Hydro Power Plant (25MW) inaugurated in Shabran in Sep 2013
- Arpachay-1 (20.5 MW) and Arpachay-2 (1.4 MW) hydro-electric power stations launched in Sharur region in 2014.
- Ismayilli-2 (1.6-MW) hydroelectric plant launched in 2015
- Azerbaijan and Iran signed agreement for "Khudaferin" and "Giz Galasi" hydro-junctions and hydroelectric power plants on Araz River in Feb 2016

== See also ==
- List of power stations in Azerbaijan
- Renewable energy sources in Azerbaijan
- Natural Resources of Azerbaijan
- Energy in Azerbaijan
