= Utilities in Azerbaijan =

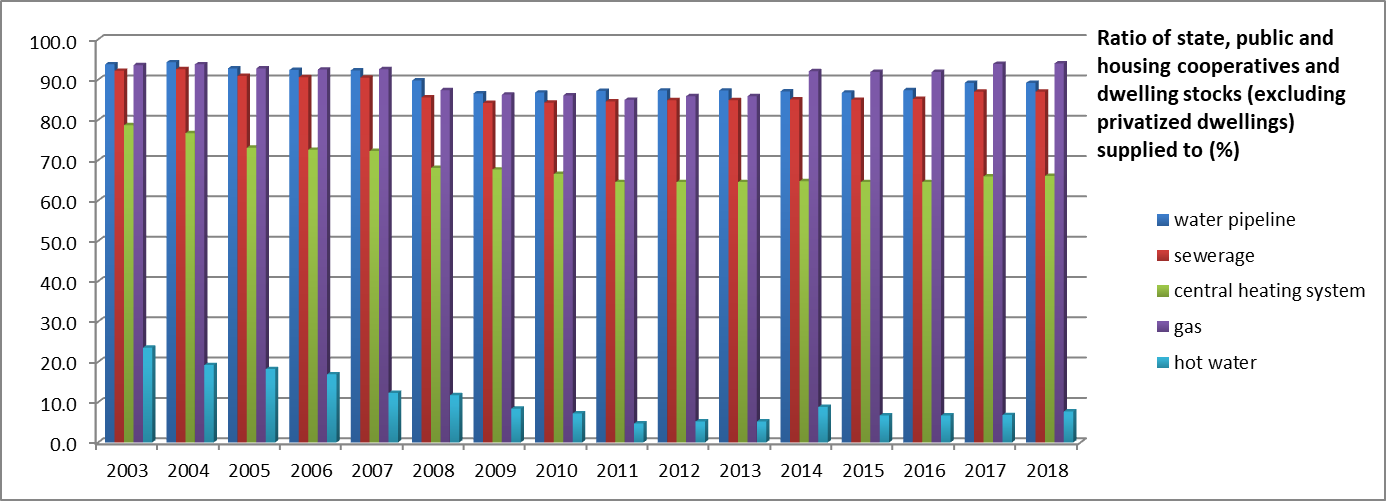
Housing fund supplied with public utilities extracted State Statistical Committee of Azerbaijan

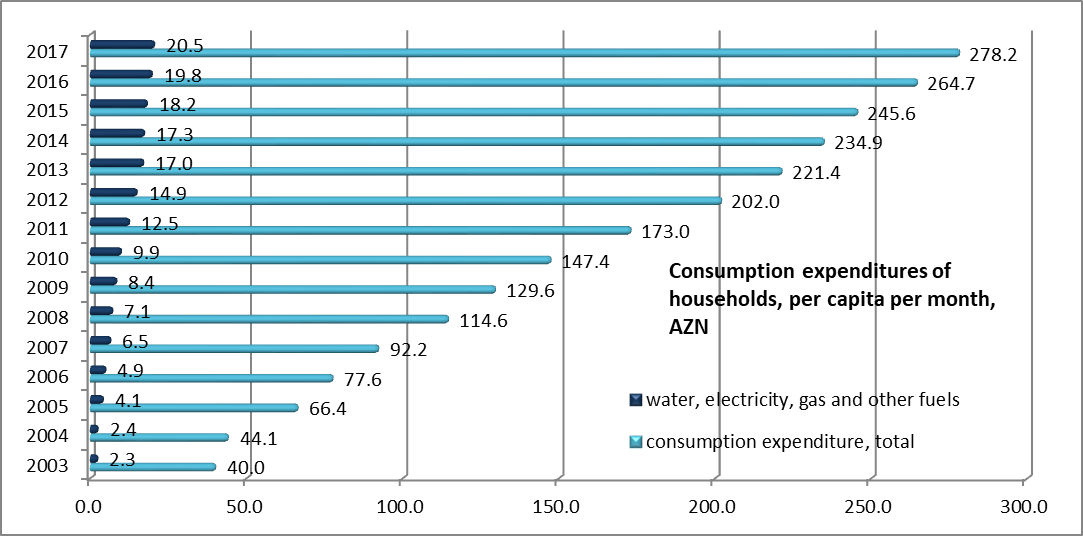
Water, electricity, gas consumption expenditures of households, AZN, per capita per month extracted State Statistical Committee of Azerbaijan

Utilities in Azerbaijan cover the topic of public utility services in the territory of Azerbaijani Republic. The utilities of Azerbaijan are provided by the government owned public utilities: “Azersu” for the water supply and waste management, “Azerishiq” and “Azerenerji” for electricity, “Azerigaz” for natural gas, “Azeristiliktechizat” for district heating.

== Electricity ==
Electrical power is the widely utilized energy source in Azerbaijan in terms of domestic and industrial use. Electricity production and its distribution are covered by the state-owned Azerenerji JSC and Azerishig JSC.

The first electricity production plants in Azerbaijan were established at Bayil avenue ("Bakinski dok") in 1895 and in Bibiheybat-Bayil cape which was put into use in 1901, as well as the Belqorod power station in Beliy Qorod in 1902. Private power companies and stations were nationalized after Azerbaijan was invaded by the 11th Army of Soviet Russia in 1920. Baku power network operated under “Elektrotok” department of Azneft until it was transferred to newly established "Azenerji" Azerbaijan Region Energy Office in 1935. Throughout the years, a number of changes were applied to the companies dealing with electrical power production and distribution. In 1993 “Azerenerji Production Association” was formed as a public company responsible for electrical power production and transmission in the country which was transformed into “Azerenerji JSC” in 1996.

Baku Power Network operated under different public organizations and it became separate state-owned company – “Bakielektrikshebeke JSC” according to the Presidential decree dated on 14 June 2000. Its functions suspended in 2002 and restored in 2006. It is called “Azerishig JSC” based on the Presidential Decree dated 10.02.2015 and is responsible for electrical power provision to the subscribers.

The whole country's electricity demand is furnished by the power stations operating under Azerenerji. 13 of those stations are thermal power stations with the installed capacity of 5134 MW power, and 17 are hydro-power stations with the installed capacity of 1162.2 MW power. Moreover, a number of small power stations have been set up by other companies in the country by utilizing water, wind, solar, domestic wastes. Electricity production reached 24.32 billion kWh in 2017, while consumption was 17.09 billion kWh. Total installed capacity in September 2019 is 6.6455 million kW. Eight thermal plants supply 80% of capacity, including Shimal-2 power station put into used in early September 2019. 12% comes from 2 hydroelectric plants (Mingachevir HPP and Shamkir HPP), and the rest from other thermal, hydro and small hydro plants. The main power plants (both are thermal) are near Shirvan (Janub TPP - 780 MW) and Mingechaur (Azerbaijan TPP - 2,400 MW).

== Natural gas ==
Transmission, distribution and production of natural gas in the territory of the Azerbaijani Republic is regulated by the state-owned company Azerigaz Production Union under SOCAR.

“The State Program on Socio-economic Development of the Regions of the Republic of Azerbaijan (2004-2008)" approved by the Decree of the President of the Republic of Azerbaijan dated February 11, 2004 and The State Program on the Development of the Energy Complex (2005-2015) dated February 14, 2005 accelerated the process of natural gas supply of the economy and population of Azerbaijan and the restructuring of the gas sector.

The Presidential decrees on State Program on Development of Fuel and Energy Complex (2005-2015) of the Republic of Azerbaijan dated 14 February 2005, State Program on Socio-Economic Development of the Republic of Azerbaijan in 2009-2013 dated 14 August 2009, “State Program on the socio-economic development of Baku and its settlements" dated 4 May 2011, "State program of economic development of the regions of the Republic of Azerbaijan for 2014-2018" dated 17 January 2014 and "State Program on socio-economic development of Baku and its settlements in 2014-2016" dated 27 February 2014 improved gas supply in the country.

The decree on “Removal of debt of population for natural gas consumption” signed by the President of Azerbaijan on December 29, 2009, provided cleanup of unpaid bills of population for natural gas until 1 October 2009. Natural gas network was extended to 1309 settlements between 2009 and 2016. Natural gas supply level in Azerbaijan reached 87.8% in October 2016. As the result of the execution of gasification program, natural gas supply level in 5 cities (Sumgait, Mingachevir, Ganja, Naftalan and Shirvan) and 6 rayons (Absheron, Bilasuvar, Hajiqabul, Fuzuli, Balakan and Qazakh) increased to 100%.

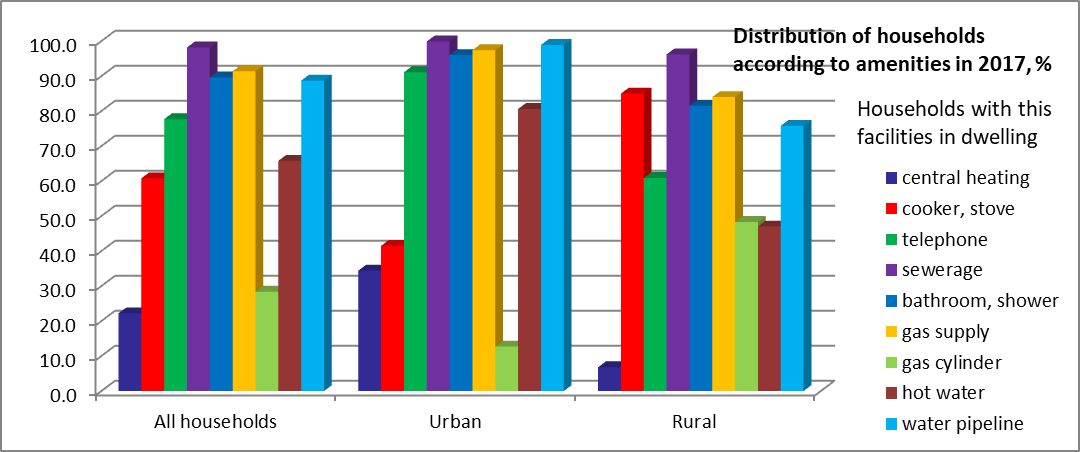
Distribution of household according to amenities in Azerbaijan in 2017 extracted State Statistical Committee of Azerbaijan

== Water supply ==
Potable water supply and sanitation services in Azerbaijan are centrally managed by Azersu JSC. The company is responsible for taking water from the sources, processing, transporting and distributing of water, and purifying wastewater. Azersu also deal with designing water intake structures, reservoirs, pumping stations, water pipelines, sewage collectors, and their construction, operation and maintenance.

Azersu controls 18K kilometers of water transmission lines and 3500 kilometers of sewer and stormwater lines. Water supply Baku city and Absheron peninsula is fulfilled from 5 – 3 underground and 2 surface water sources: 2 underground water sources located in Khachmaz, the underground water source of Oghuz, and Jeyranbatan reservoir, as well as Kura River. Drinking water is delivered to Baku through Shollar and Second Baku waterlines from Khachmaz, waterlines from Kura and Jeyranbatan water treatment plants and Oguz-Qabala-Baku waterline.

== District heating ==
Heating supply to subscribers is managed by Azeristiliktechizat JSC established in June 2005. This company deal with the generation of thermal energy, its transmission, distribution and sale, at the same time provides heating supply to residential houses and apartments, educational and healthcare facilities, as well as other social facilities based in Baku and different regions of the country.

== Post and telecommunication ==
The first post office in the territory of Azerbaijan was opened in Ganja in 1818, and the network extended to Baku, Nakhchivan, Shusha, Shamakhi and Guba until 1830. Postal items were delivered by railway for the first time in 1883 between Baku and Tbilisi. The Ministry of Post and Telegraph was formed on October 6, 1918.

Azerpost is the only national postal operator providing postal services in Azerbaijan. In addition to Azerpost, there are more than 60 private postal operators providing fast and courier mail services to entities and individuals.

=== Telephone ===
The first telephone line in Azerbaijan was established in 1881 by “Nobel Brothers’ society”. There are 2 main public operator providing fixed telephone network services in Azerbaijan. One of them is Aztelekom established in 1992 as a national communication operator in order to improve telecommunication services in the country. The other is Baku Telephone Communications LLC. The wired and wireless telephone network of Baku Telephone Communications LLC covers administrative districts of Baku, and Aztelekom's network covers the whole country except Baku and Nakhchivan.

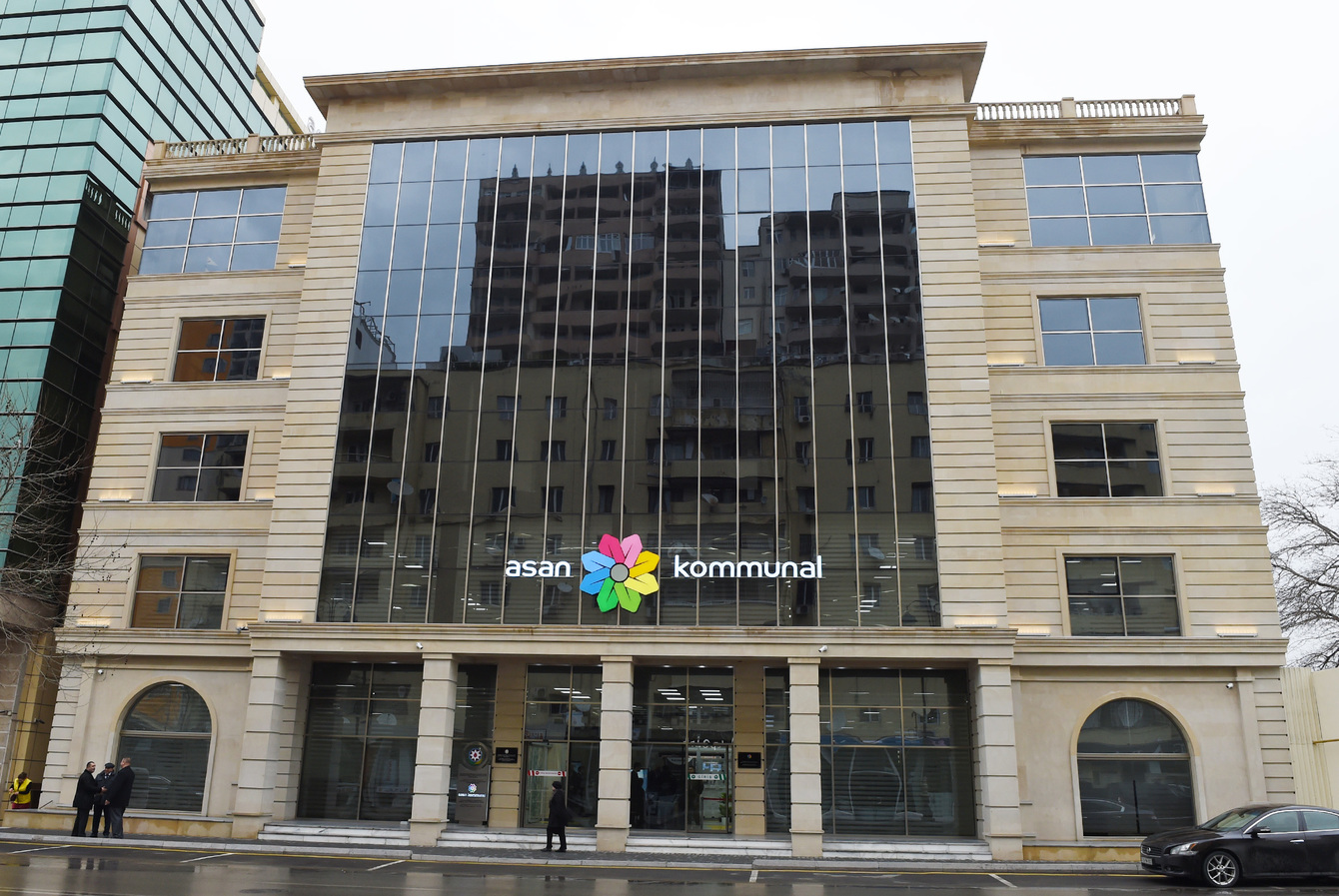
ASAN Kommunal center in Azerbaijan

== Asan Kommunal ==
ASAN Kommunal (ASAN Utilities) centers under the State Agency on Public Services and Social Innovations were established according to the Presidential Decree dated 04.05.2016 in order to provide customer services in public utilities sector to legal entities and individuals in a single location based on ASAN service principles. These centers offer more than 40 services of Azerishig, Azersu and Azerigaz related to electricity, water and natural gas provision in addition to banking and insurance services. There are two centers of ASAN Kommunal operating in Baku.

== Utility tariff ==
Utility tariffs in Azerbaijan are assigned by the Tariff (price) Council of the Azerbaijan Republic established in 2005 in order to reinforce anti-inflationary measures in the country. The council is chaired by the Minister of Economy and Industry. Its regulations are applied to processing, transportation, wholesale and retail tariffs of natural gas; general-purpose postal services; electricity; water supply, solid waste collection, transportation and disposal; services rendered by Azeristiliktechizat Open Joint Stock Company; communication services via fixed telephone network; as well as public transport services.

== See also ==
- Economy of Azerbaijan
- ASAN Service
