= Yukhari Vang Hydroelectric Power Station =

Hydroelectric power station in Kalbajar District, Azerbaijan

Yukhari Vang Hydroelectric Power Plant
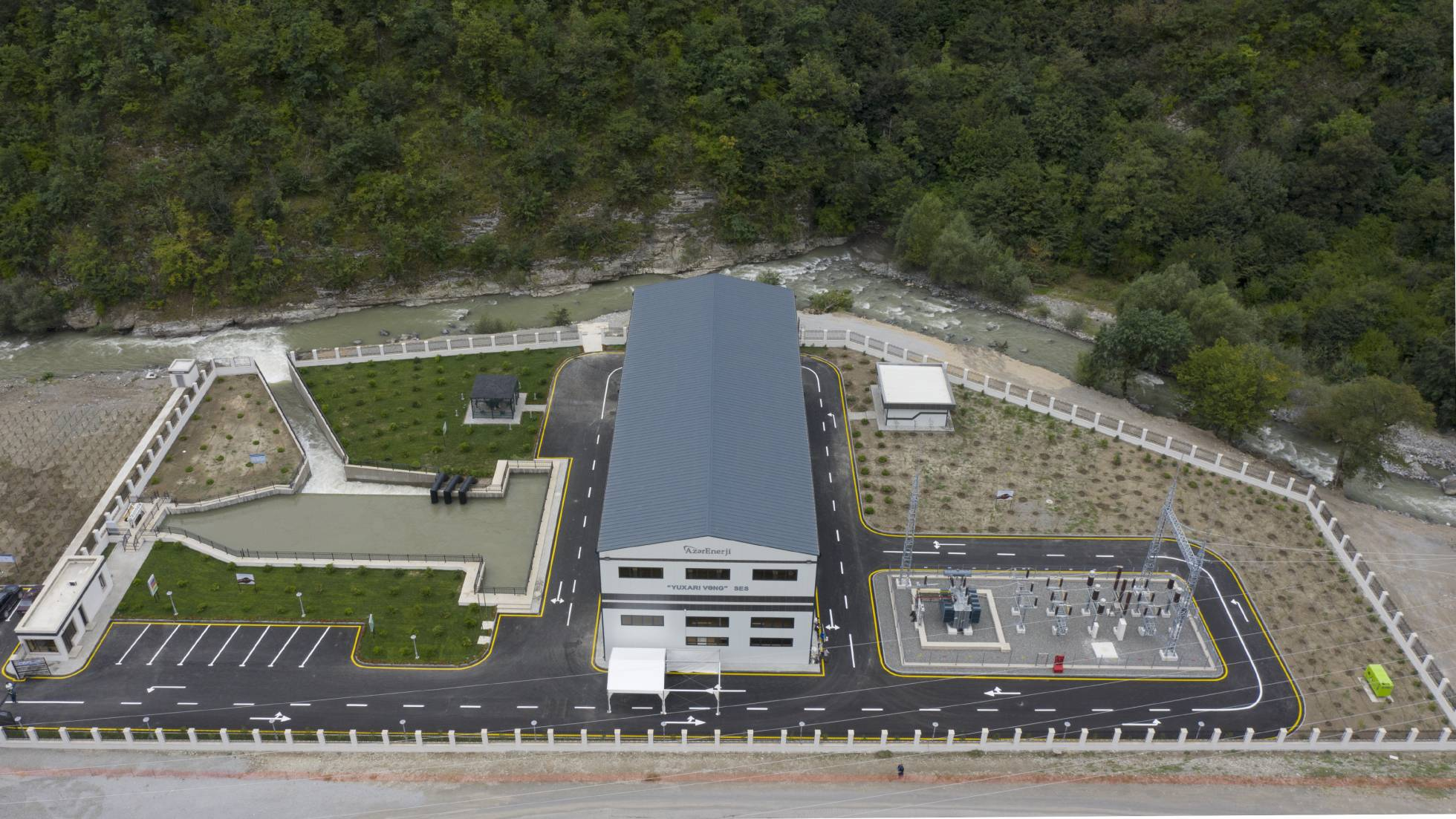
- Yukhari Vang Hydroelectric Power Plant in September 2024
- Official name: Azerbaijani: Yuxarı Vəng Su Elektrik Stansiyası
- Country: Azerbaijan
- Location: Kalbajar District, on the Tartar River
- Status: Operational
- Commission date: 2 September 2024
- Owner: Azerenerji
- Operator: Azerenerji

Hydroelectric
- River: Tartar River
- Cascade: Kalbajar HPP cascade

Power generation
- Nameplate capacity: 22.5 MW
- Annual net output: 66 GWh

External links
- Commons: Related media on Commons

Yukhari Vang Hydroelectric Power Station (Azerbaijani: Yuxarı Vəng Su Elektrik Stansiyası) is a hydroelectric power station in Kalbajar District of Azerbaijan, built on the Tartar River. It was commissioned on 2 September 2024 and has an installed capacity of 22.5 MW.

== History and features ==
The power station was built by Azerenerji and is part of the Kalbajar hydropower cascade, reported to have a total capacity of 40 MW. Water is supplied to the station from two sources: the outlet of the Nadirkhanli HPP and a main water-intake structure built on the Tutgu River.

The facility includes a 110 kV outdoor switchyard, a 24-core fibre-optic communication line, and integration into the centralized SCADA system; it also uses digital control systems and includes cybersecurity measures. Environmental protection measures described for the project include hydraulic devices designed to prevent river fish from entering the derivation pipeline and to keep them within the river ecosystem.

The project was developed by Azerenerji’s Energy Institute with participation of specialists from Austrian and Italian companies. The plant is designed to generate up to 66 million kWh (66 GWh) of electricity annually, which is associated in published figures with potential savings of 15 million m³ of natural gas and avoidance of more than 27,000 tonnes of carbon dioxide emissions.

== See also ==
- Energy in Azerbaijan
- Azerenerji
