= Yusifli =

- Yusifli, Agdam, is a village and municipality in the Agdam Rayon of Azerbaijan.
- Yusifli, Jalilabad, is a village and municipality in the Jalilabad Rayon of Azerbaijan.
- Yusifli, Masally, is a village and municipality in the Masally Rayon of Azerbaijan.
