= Energy in Azerbaijan =

Two-thirds of energy in Azerbaijan comes from fossil gas and almost a third from oil. Azerbaijan is a major producer of oil and gas, much of which is exported. Most electricity is generated by gas-fired power plants. Energy in the country is produced using all types of sources, including fuel, renewable energy, water energy, electrical and heat energy.

Corruption in Azerbaijan is alleged to be connected to the oil and gas industry, which is very important for the economy. The majority of the oil and gas resources in the country is controlled by a consortium headed by British Petroleum.

Within the country, counting use of exports, greenhouse gas emissions per person are around the world average. Azerbaijan aims to reduce its emissions by reducing gas leaks and reducing flaring.

== History ==
In 1847, Azerbaijan became the site of the world's first industrially drilled oil well. By 1899, Azerbaijan produced half of the volume of the world's oil.

The Araz hydroelectric power station with a total capacity of 22 MW was constructed in 1970, Tartar hydroelectric power station with a total capacity of 50 MW in 1976 and Shamkir hydroelectric power station with a total capacity of 380 MW in 1982.

At that time, along with the construction of power stations, electrical networks were systematically developed and the country's sustainable energy system was created. In those years, "Ali Bayramli" thermal power station with 330 kV – Aghdam – Ganja – Aghstafa, Ali Bayramli – Yashma – Derbent, 5th Mingachevir, 500kV 1st and 2nd Absheron, Mukhranis – Vali and other power lines, Yashma, Ganja, Agstafa with 330/110/10 kV, Imishli with 330/110/10 kV, Absheron with 500/330/220 kV, Hovsan, Nizami, Mushfig, Sangachal, Masalli, Agsu, and Babek with 220/110/10 electrical substations have been put into operation.

A $53 million loan was granted to Azerbaijan by the European Bank for Reconstruction and Development for the construction of the Yenikend hydroelectric power station in December 1995, and the Yenikend HPP was built with a total capacity of 150 MW.

The reconstruction of the Mingachevir hydroelectric power station, 330 kV Aghjabadi, 110 kV Barda substations and the 330kV Azerbaijan Thermal Power Station – 330 kV Agjabadi-Imishli transmission lines were implemented at the expense of the European Bank for Reconstruction and Development and the Islamic Development Bank.

Two gas-turbine units with a capacity of 53.5 MW each at Baku thermal power station, funded by the German bank – Bayerische Landesbank Girozentrale, and a 400MW steam gas plant at the Shimal power plant at the expense of the Japanese International Cooperation Bank's loan were commissioned in 2002.

On February 14, 2005, the head of state approved the State Program on Development of the Fuel and Energy Complex (2005–2015) in the Republic of Azerbaijan.

The electricity demand of the economy of the country has been completely provided by 12 thermal power stations such as Azerbaijan TPP, Shirvan TPP, Shimal TPP, Baku TPP, Nakhchivan TPP, Astara, Khachmaz, Sheki, Nakhchivan, Baku, Quba, Sangachal power stations, and 6 water power stations such as Mingechevir, Shamkir, Yenikend, Varvara, Araz, and Vaykhir HPP. Their total capacity was about 5,900 megawatts. 90 percent of electricity production in Azerbaijan accounts for TPPs, and 10 percent for hydroelectric power stations.

The Energy Regulatory Agency under the Ministry of Energy was established on the basis of the Department for State Energy And Gas Supervision of the Ministry of Energy of the Republic of Azerbaijan by the decree of the president dated December 22, 2017, and its charter was approved.

According to the World Energy Trilemma İndex, compiled by the World Energy Council for 2017, Azerbaijan has taken 31st place (BBA) among 125 countries.

According to the Global Energy Architecture Performance Index report for 2017, compiled by the World Economic Forum, Azerbaijan ranked 36th out of 127 countries with a 0.67 score. According to the 2016 report from the same organization, Azerbaijan ranked 32nd out of 126 countries with a 0.68 score. Economic growth and development had a 0.68 score, environmental sustainability a 0.57 score, and energy access and security a 0.79 score.

On April 19, 2019, SOCAR president Rovnag Abdullayev and BP’s regional president for Azerbaijan, Georgia, and Turkey, Garry Johns signed a contract for $6 billion. The final investment decision on the Azeri Central East (ACE) platform, which is planned to be built on the Azeri-Chirag-Gunashli (ACG) block, was adopted at the signing ceremony. Construction was scheduled to start in 2019, and the completion was scheduled for mid-2022.

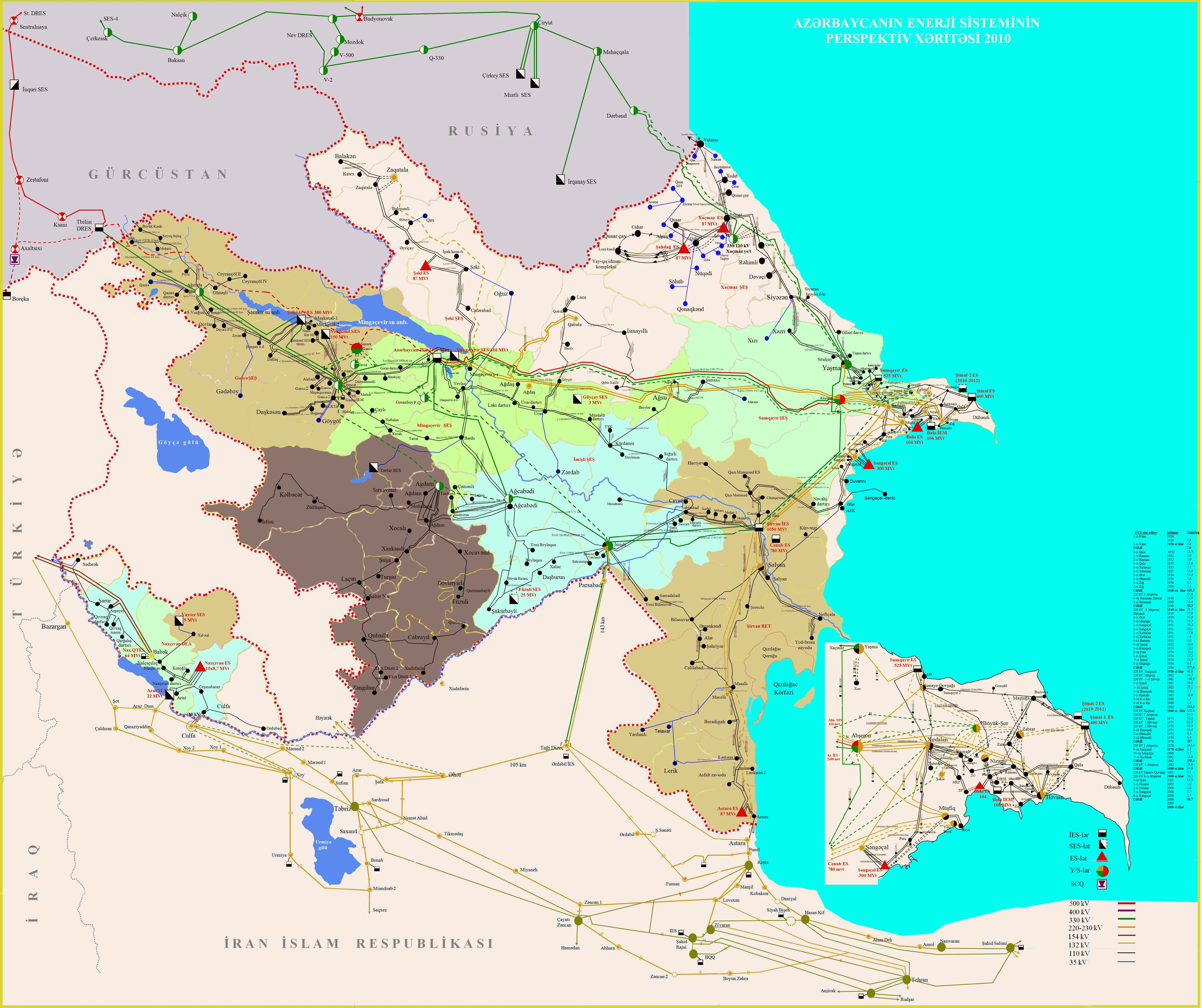

== Oil ==
- Production: - 931,990 bbl/d (148,175 m^{3}/d) (2008)
- Consumption: - 160,000 bbl/d (25,000 m^{3}/d) (2007)

From 1987 to 1993, production decreased from 13.8 million tons of oil and 12.5 billion cubic meters of gas to 10.3 million tons of oil and 6.8 billion cubic meters of gas. The annual rate of decline in production was 7.1% for oil and 13.5% for gas. The exploratory drilling decreased by 17 times, or by 170,000 meters, was 10,000 meters in 1995 compared to 1970.

=== "Shah deniz-2" ===
"Shah Deniz-2" energy strategic projects is the energy security and energy diversification project.

Contract of the Shah Deniz gas field was signed in 1996, and the first pipeline connecting the Caspian Sea with the Georgian side of the Black Sea coast was built in 1999. The Baku-Tbilisi-Ceyhan main oil export pipeline connecting the Caspian Sea with the Mediterranean and international markets was built in 2006, and the Southern Gas Pipeline in 2007.

=== Transparency ===
The 2013 report by UK-based Global Witness NGO revealed that companies working in Azerbaijan’s oil industry have no transparency and accountability. It has been documented that millions of dollars of revenue disappear into the hands of obscurely owned private companies that cooperate with SOCAR.

The report concluded that the opacity of the deals struck by Socar "is systemic" and added, “These findings should be of great concern to the international community as a whole. Oil and its derivative products are central to the Azerbaijani economy, making up 95% of exports in 2011. It is important for Europe that Azerbaijan keeps the oil and gas flowing and maintains a transparent and well-run energy industry. Yet, this briefing shows that much of the oil business in Azerbaijan remains opaque, and corruption is still perceived to be at epidemic levels…"

== Natural gas ==
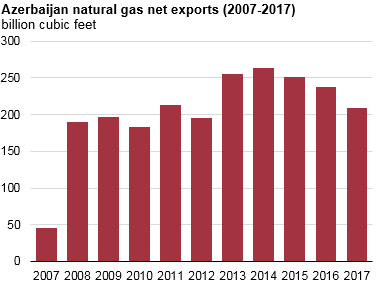
Natural gas exports, 2007–2017

On March 10, 2016, Natiq Aliyev, Azerbaijani energy minister, publicly said that Azerbaijan has enough gas reserves to fill the Southern Gas Corridor (SGC). The SGC is an energy project whose goal is to move 10 billion cub meters of gas from Azerbaijan through Georgia and Turkey to Europe.

Azerbaijan has an estimated 1.3 trillion cubic metres of natural gas reserves. The country produced 46.7bn cu metres of natural gas in 2022 (up from 43.8bn cu metres in 2021). The natural gas exports of 22.3bn cu metres in 2022, are up from 19bn cu metres in 2021 (a rise of 18%), of which 11.4bn cu metres went to the EU, compared with 8.1bn cu metres in 2021.

== Electricity ==
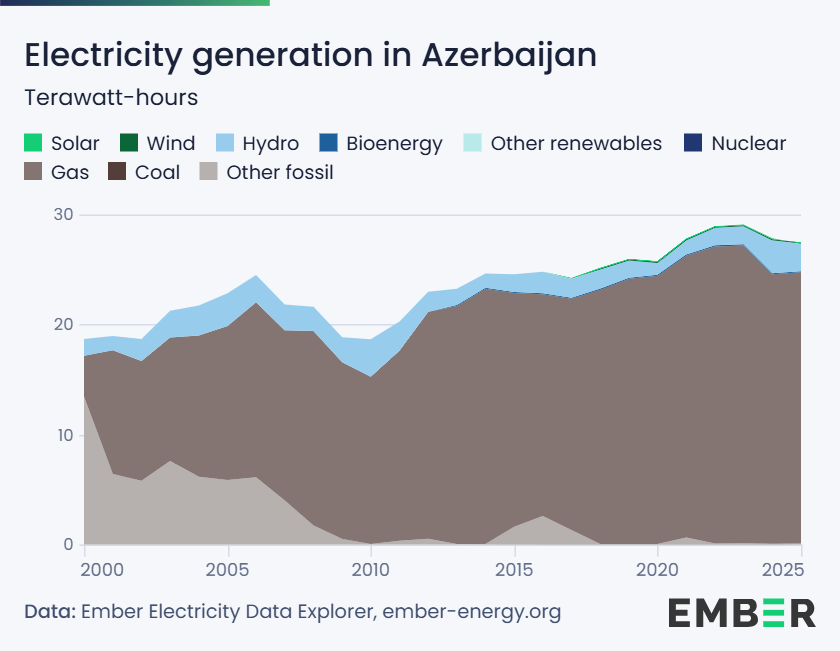
Electricity generation in Azerbaijan in terawatt-hours

- production: 24.32 billion kWh (2017)
- consumption: 17.09 billion kWh (2017)

Electrical power is the widely utilized energy source in Azerbaijan in terms of domestic and industrial use.Electricity production and its distribution are covered by the state-owned Azerenerji JSC and Azerishig JSC. The whole country's electricity demand is furnished by the power stations operating under Azerenerji. 13 of those stations are thermal power stations with the installed capacity of 5,400 MW power, and 17 are hydropower stations with the installed capacity of 1,162.2 MW power. Moreover, a number of small power stations have been set up by other companies in the country by utilizing water, wind, solar, and domestic waste.

Total installed capacity in September 2019 is 6.6455 million kW. Eight thermal plants supply 80% of capacity, including Shimal-2 power station put into used in early September 2019. 12% comes from 2 hydroelectric plants (Mingachevir HPP and Shamkir HPP), and the rest from other thermal, hydro and small hydro plants. The main power plants (both are thermal) are near Shirvan (Janub TPP – 780 MW) and Mingachevir (Azerbaijan TPP – 2,400 MW).

== Report of 2017 ==
The power of the country's electro-energy system has reached 7,172.6 MW. Currently, the system's capacity is 5,200 MW and the peak power required is around 3,750-3,900 MW. In 2017, the production of electricity amounted to 22,209.8 million kWh including 20,445.4 million kWh at thermal power plants and 1,732.8 million kWh of electricity at hydroelectric power stations and decreased by 2.0% compared to the corresponding period of 2016 (22,665.7 million kWh).

A total of 4,778.8 million cubic meters of natural gas and 311.5 thousand tons of mazut fuel oil were used for electricity generation during the year.

A 50 MVA transformer with 110/35 kV, two 110 kV circuit breakers, and 35 kV electrical equipment were installed at Hoca Hasan substation of Binagadi district. 110 kV double-circuit transmission line between 110 kV Liman and White City substations, three transformer substations with 35 / 0,4 kV were constructed.

In 2017, oil production amounted to around 38.7 million tons in the country. 28.9 million tons of extracted oil belonged to the Azeri-Chirag-Gunashli, 2.4 million tons to Shah Deniz (condensate), and 7.4 million tons to the State Oil Company of the Azerbaijan Republic.

In 2017, President Ilham Aliyev took part in the opening of the following substations:

- Sarıcali Substation with 110/35/10 kV in Saatli district
- Yenikend Substation with 110/35/6 kV in Samukh district
- New Ganja Substation with 110/35/10 kV in Ganja town
- Neftchala Substation at 110/35/6 kV in Neftchala district
- Garagashli Substation with 110/35/10 kV in Salyan district
- Shamkir Automated Management and Control Center of Azerishig OJSC.

=== Hydroelectric power plants ===
- Mingechevir Hydro Power Plant – 402 MW
- Sarsang Hydro Power Plant – 50 MW
- Shamkir Hydro Power Plant – 405 MW
- Yenikend Hydro Power Plant – 150 MW

== Foreign investment competition with non-energy sectors ==
In January 2015, the president of Azerbaijan, Ilham Aliyev, announced that he would direct his government to create programs to bring investment dollars to industries other than oil. Specifically, President Aliyev cited industrial and agricultural industries as an example.

Aliyev cited Azerbaijani's economy, saying, "That's why it's much easier to attract investments to stable countries with socio-political stability and information growth". He said that the banking industry will become more important in helping develop the country's non-energy industries.

== See also ==
- Petroleum industry in Azerbaijan
- Economy of Azerbaijan
- Natural resources of Azerbaijan
