= Araz (name) =

- Pronunciation: [ɑˈɾɑz]
- Gender: Unisex
- Language: Turkish

Origin
- Meaning: Happiness

Araz is a unisex given name and a surname, found primarily in Armenia, Azerbaijan, and Turkey.

It was one of the surnames which was suggested by the Turkish Language Research Institution (Turkish: Türk Dili Araştırma Kurumu), precursor of the Turkish Language Association, after the Turkish language reform in 1932. In Turkish, it means "happiness".

== Given name ==
=== Male ===
- Araz Abdullayev (born 1992), Azerbaijani football player
- Araz Alizadeh (1951–2022), Azerbaijani politician
- Araz Azimov (born 1962), Azerbaijani diplomat
- Araz Musayev (born 1977), Azerbaijani Muay Thai kickboxer
- Araz Selimov (1960–1992), Azerbaijani military officer and farmer

=== Female ===
- Araz Artinian, Canadian filmmaker of Armenian origin
- Araz Dare (born 1975), Iranian Armenian musical artist

== Surname ==
- Mammad Araz (1933–2004), Azerbaijani poet
- Musa Araz (born 1994), Swiss football player
- Nezihe Araz (1920–2009), Turkish writer and journalist
- Süleyman Araz (born 1995), Turkish archer

== See also ==
- Araz (disambiguation)
- Aras (name), list of people with a similar name
