= Yusifli, Masally =

Yusifli
- Village
- Location within Azerbaijan
- Coordinates: 38°58′53″N 48°39′51″E
- Country: Azerbaijan
- District: Masally
- Established: 2001

Population (2009)
  - Total: 158
- Time zone: UTC+4 (AZT)
- Area code: +994 151

Yusifli (Azerbaijani: Yusifli) is a village in the Masally District of Azerbaijan.

It was previously part of the Musakücə village administrative unit but was separated by the law of the Republic of Azerbaijan dated 5 October 2001 (No. 191-IIQ), which established the Lürən village administrative area with Lürən as its centre.

== Etymology ==
The village was formerly known as "Mollaabad" and is also referred to by locals as "Molla Yusiflər". The settlement developed from a neighbourhood of Lürən village. It was named Yusifli after the mollayusiflər lineage, the families of the first settlers who belonged to that clan.

== Population ==
As of the 2009 census, the population of Yusifli was 158.
