= 154th battalion of Schutzmannschaft =

- 154. Batalion Schutzmannschaft / Tatarische
- Active: 1942—1944
- Country: Nazi Germany
- Allegiance: German Auxiliary Police
- Type: Schutzmannschaft
- Engagements: World War II

The 154th Schutzmannschaft Battalion was a Schutzmannschaft police unit of the German Auxiliary Police formed in July 1942 in Simferopol. It was one of eight so-called Tatar Schutzmannschaft battalions. The battalion was trained in Simferopol and remained there as a reserve unit after its training, except for one platoon, which was sent to the village of Beshuy for service. By October 1942, the battalion's strength had reached 679 men.

According to Ukrainian historians Oleh Bazhan and Ivan Dereiko, around 350 Ukrainian prisoners of war were transferred to the 154th Battalion in December 1942. Ivan Dereiko claims the battalion was formed based on a Ukrainian labor column, with a few Tatar officers, and that 350 Ukrainians were only redistributed to other units at the end of 1943, replaced by local volunteers.

The 154th Battalion conducted raids and uncovered Soviet party property in Simferopol.

German command reports on the battalion's activities from November 9 to December 28, 1942 include the following details:

- From November 9 to 12, 93 "Tatar volunteers" fought against 100 partisans near the village of Orakchi, killing 1 and wounding 5, though the partisans escaped.
- On November 29, 2 partisans were captured in the village of Kurtuluk, and near the village of Sollar (10 km from Karasubazar), 5 partisans were killed and 2 were captured severely wounded.
- On December 4, during a battle south of the village of Chornolak (14 km from Karasubazar), 1 partisan was captured, and another was wounded but managed to escape.

From the summer of 1943, the discipline and morale of the "auxiliary police" units began to deteriorate. The commander of the 154th Battalion, A. Kerimov, was arrested by the Germans as unreliable. By the winter of 1943, this disintegration became irreversible, and many "volunteers" (including Crimean Tatars) left the units and joined partisan groups. By March 5, 1944, the 154th Battalion had less than half its original personnel.

The battalion was disbanded on July 8, 1944, and used to form the Tatar Mountain Jaeger Regiment SS.
