= Araz (disambiguation) =

Araz may refer to:

- Araz (name), list of people with the name
- Araz, Azerbaijan, village and municipality in the Babek District of Nakhchivan, Azerbaijan
- Araz Ali Sheykh, village in the Golestan Province, Iran
- Araz Gol, village in the Golestan Province, Iran
- Araz-Naxçıvan PFK, Azerbaijani football club based in Nakchivan
- Araz Taqan, village in the Golestan Province, Iran
- Araz Zərgar, village and municipality in the Fuzuli District of Azerbaijan
