= Yenikend Hydroelectric Power Station =

Hydroelectric power station in Azerbaijan

Yenikend Hydro Power Plant
- Country: Azerbaijan
- Location: Yenikend, Samukh Rayon
- Coordinates: 40°55′9″N 46°16′58″E
- Status: Operational
- Owner: Azerenerji
- Operator: Azerenerji

Thermal power station
- Primary fuel: Hydropower

Power generation
- Nameplate capacity: 150 MW (200,000 hp)

The Yenikend Hydro Power Plant is one of Azerbaijan's largest hydro power plant having an installed electric capacity of 150 megawatts (200,000 hp). The power plant is owned by Azerenerji, the state-owned electric power generation and distribution company of Azerbaijan.

== See also ==
- List of power stations in Azerbaijan
