= Yusif Kerimov =

Azerbaijani scientist (1926–1997)

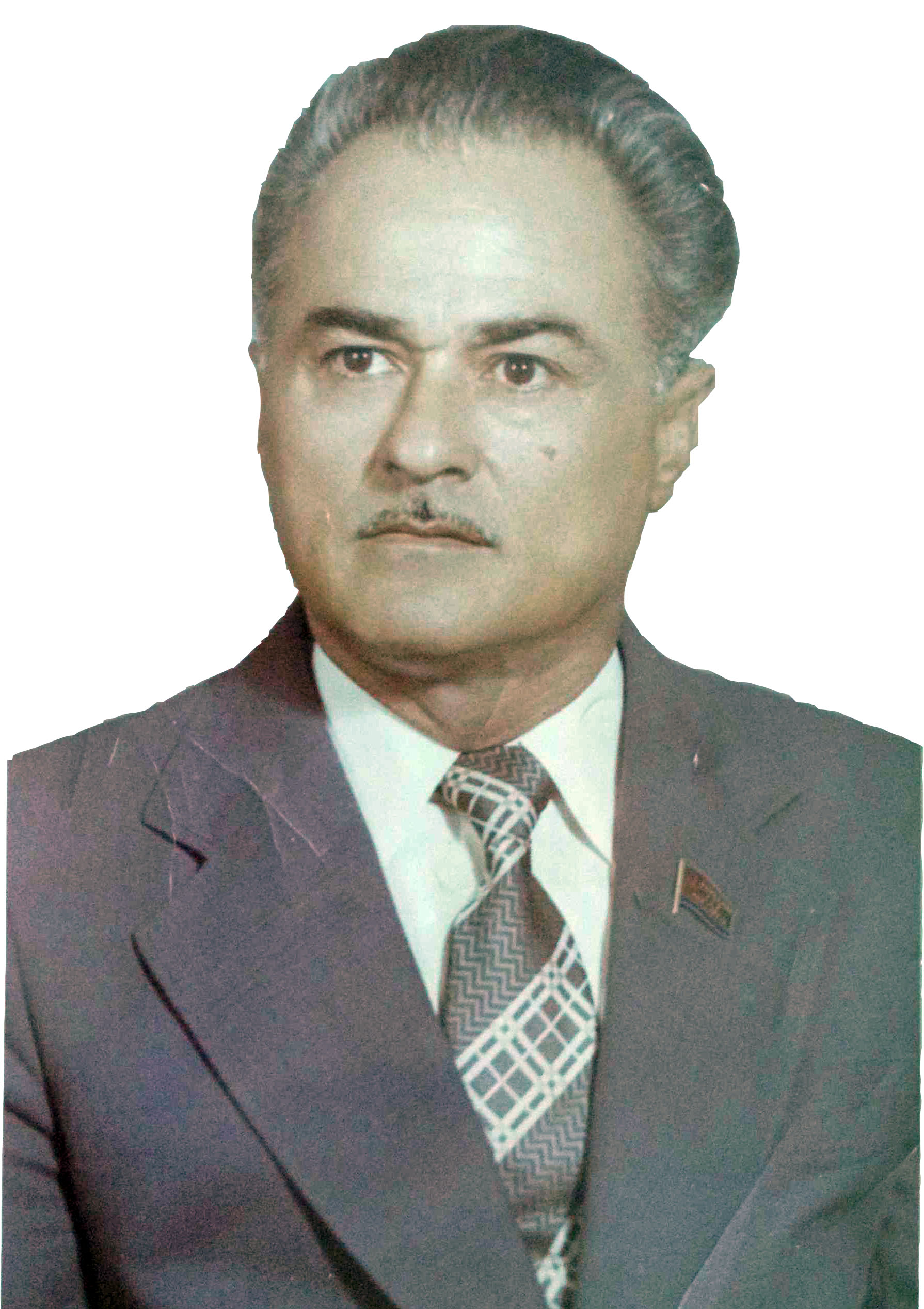
- Kerimov in 1980
- Born: 25 October 1926; Lankaran, Azerbaijan
- Died: 29 November 1997 (aged 71); Baku, Azerbaijan
- Education: Azerbaijan Industrial Institute
- Known for: Inventions in the electrical energy area, leadership in building Hydro-Electrical Stations in Azerbaijan SSR.
- Scientific career
- Fields: Electrical engineering
- Workplaces: Head Power Engineering and Electrification Department ("Азглавэнерго")

Yusif Museibovich Kerimov (Azerbaijani: Yusif Museib oglu Kərimov, Russian: Юсиф Мусеибович Керимов; 25 October 1926, Lankaran – 29 November 1997, Baku) was an Azerbaijani-Soviet electrical engineer and a renowned inventor, one of the founders of the Azerbaijani Hydro-Electrical industry.

He graduated from Azerbaijan Industrial Institute in 1948. From 1968 to 1980, he was a Minister of Energetics of Azerbaijan SSR, heading The Power Engineering And Electrification Department of Azerbaijan SSR, which was later transformed into the Azerbaijan Power Engineering and Electrification (Azglavenergo) Head Production ("Азглавэнерго", currently "Azerenergy"). He is an author of numerous research papers, articles and patents, which to this day are used worldwide, including Azerbaijan, USA, Canada, Australia, Japan and other countries. He has been awarded an "Honorable Energetician of USSR" (Почетный энергетик СССР) and an "Honorable Engineer of Azerbaijan" titles.

== Awards and titles ==
- "Honorable Energetician of USSR" (Почетный энергетик СССР)
- "Honorable Engineer of Azerbaijan".

== See also ==
- List of Azerbaijanis
- Azerenergy

== Selected publications ==
- US 3992566 (A), Aerodynamic aerial conductor vibration damper, KERIMOV JUSIF MUSEIBOVICH, 16 November 1976
