= Çaxçaxlı =

- Location within Azerbaijan
- Coordinates: 41°39′09″N 48°42′11″E
- Country: Azerbaijan
- Rayon: Khachmaz
- Municipality: Şollar
- Time zone: UTC+4 (AZT)
  - Summer (DST): UTC+5 (AZT)

Çaxçaxlı (also, Chakhchakhly) is a village in the Khachmaz Rayon of Azerbaijan. The village forms part of the municipality of Şollar.
