= Shollar water =

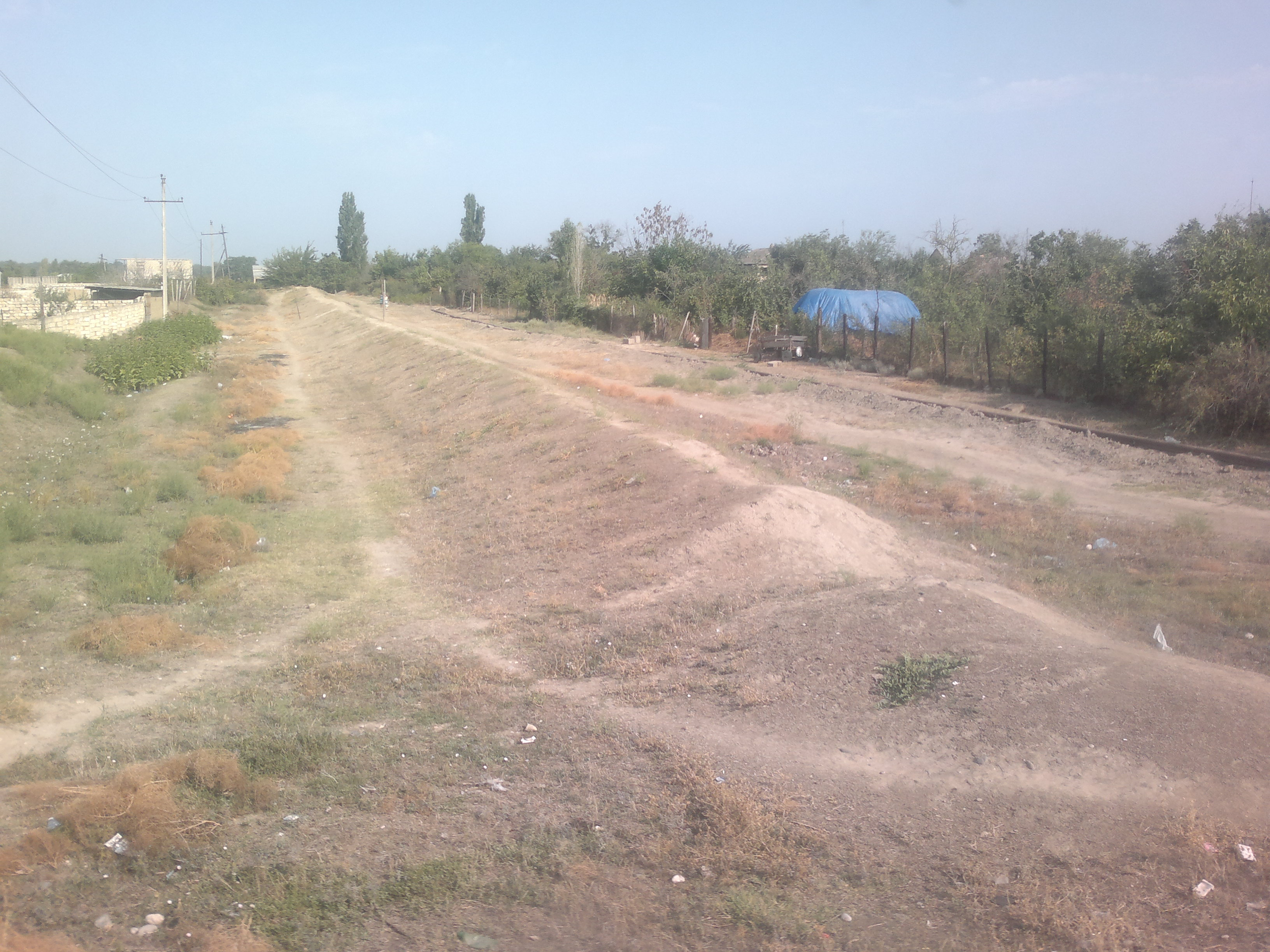
Baku-Shollar water pipeline near Khudat

Shollar water is bottled water from the Shollar spring in Şollar, Azerbaijan, or water pumped to the city of Baku from the Shollar spring.

== History ==
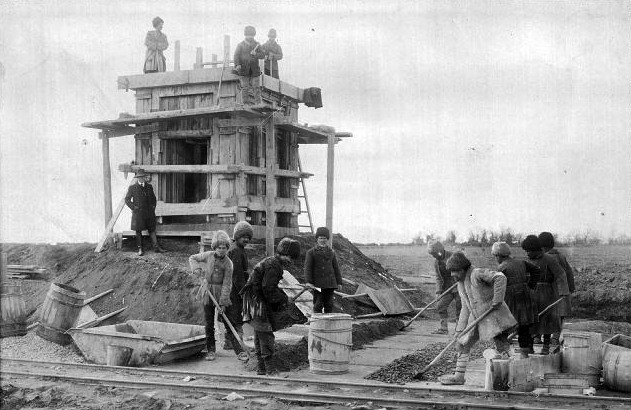
Construction of Baku-Shollar water conduit in the beginning of the 20th century

Baku is the capital and largest city of Azerbaijan, as well as the largest city in the Caspian Sea and of the Caucasus region. Despite its grandeur, in the 19th century its water was salty and seldom clean, contributing to diseases such as cholera, diphtheria, scarlet fever, typhoid, and spotted fever. Faced with constant interruptions and unsanitary supply of water, the people of Baku sought "a reliable, healthy source of water". When all known solutions had been exhausted, Baku's city planners sought international expertise. After years of research and deliberation, a decision to construct a pipeline to direct water from the Caucasus Mountains to Baku was made. Water from this pipeline became known as "Shollar water".

In the late 19th century, access to drinking water was a serious problem for most people living in Baku. Alternatives such as desalination plants or a pipeline from the Kura River were too costly, and were abandoned. While in Paris, Haji Zeynalabdin Taghiyev, an Azeri national, industrial magnate, and philanthropist, conceived an idea to build a pipeline from the foothills of the Caucasus Mountains to Baku. In 1899, Taghiyev hired William Lindley, a British civil engineer who had designed multiple water and sewerage systems for more than thirty cities across Europe. Tasked with trying to find a plentiful source of water, Lindley chose the springs near Guba, in the Caucasus Mountains. Baku's municipal government was primarily opposed to the idea of constructing a pipeline, but Taghiyev insisted, saying, "As long as the Shahdagh Mountain [had] ice on its peak …Shollar will never run out."

Lindley spent the year of 1899 completing exploratory works near Quba Uyezd's rich springs and rivers. Water was found in Shollar, located on the highlands between Qusar and Khazri. His project was supported by Alimardan Topchubashov, a member of the Duma. Topchubashov supplied 25,000 rubles for Lindley's project.

In 1901, the Duma provided another 182,000 rubles for the project. Work began on 3 January 1904. However, the project was slowed due to the revolution between 1905 and 1907. On 5 May 1909, the Duma created the Department of Construction of the Water Conduit, and Lindley was named an engineer.

Construction of the pipeline began in January 1917.

== Water conduit ==
The Baku-Shollar water conduct passes through the hills of in Guba and ends in Baku. The conduit has a length of 110 miles south and cost 27 million men to construct. Soon after its construction, the pipeline supplied 3 million buckets of water a day to Baku residents. To this day, the Shollar pipeline remains a vital source of water to central Baku. Reliable and clean, this water source has helped increase Baku's population from a few thousand to over 2.5 million.

When constructed, the Baku-Shollar water conduit was the longest in the country.

There are three Shollar Water Towers in Sovetsky settlement of Baku. According to residents, these monuments were taken under state control. These towers were built in the 19th century due to the construction of Shollar water pipeline. From each of this tower people were provided by Shollar water. These towers were functioned till the 1950s.

Shollar Water Towers in Sovetsky ( built in the 19th century)

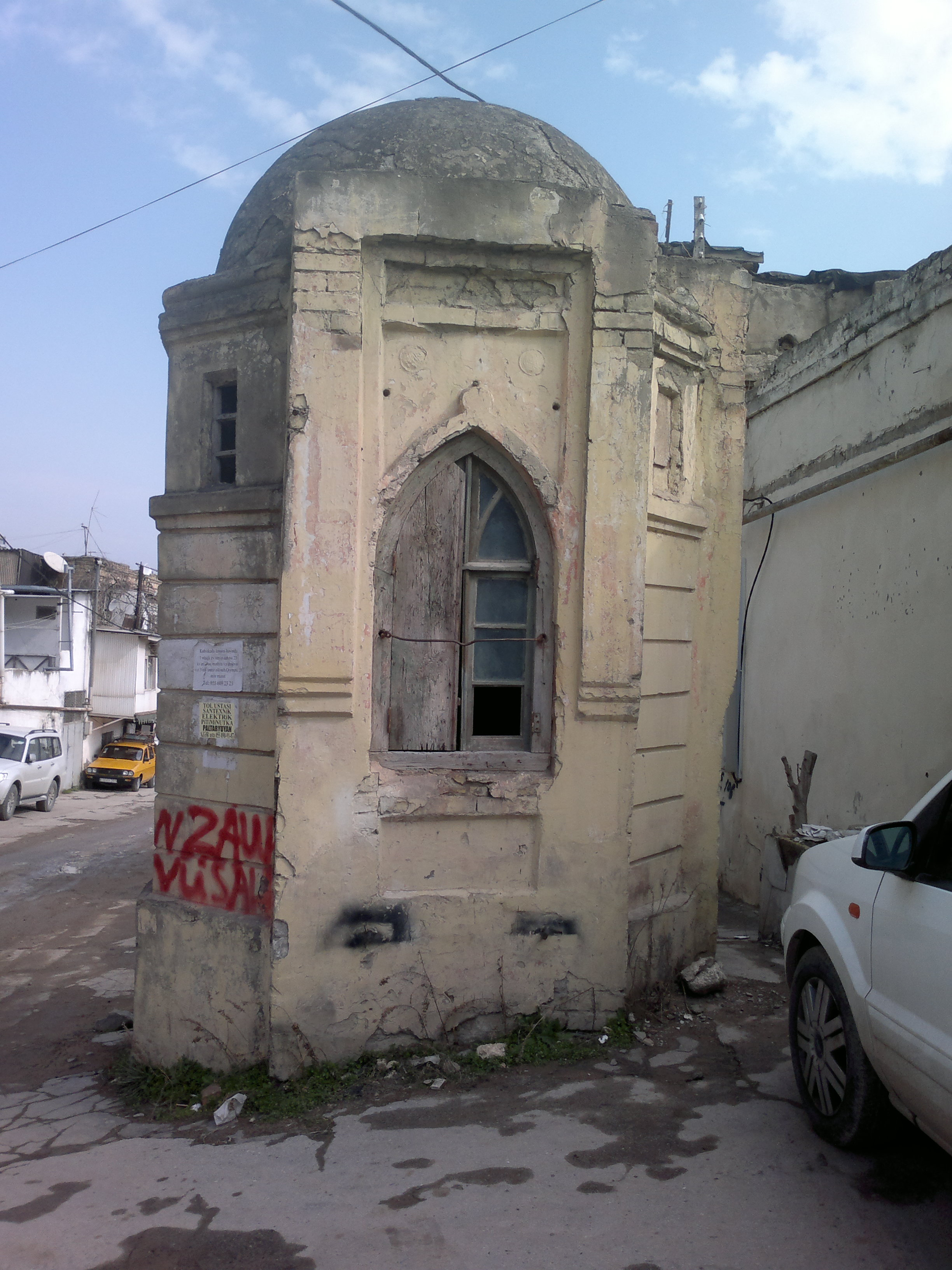
Cross of Suleyman Rahimov and Abdulla Shaig streets

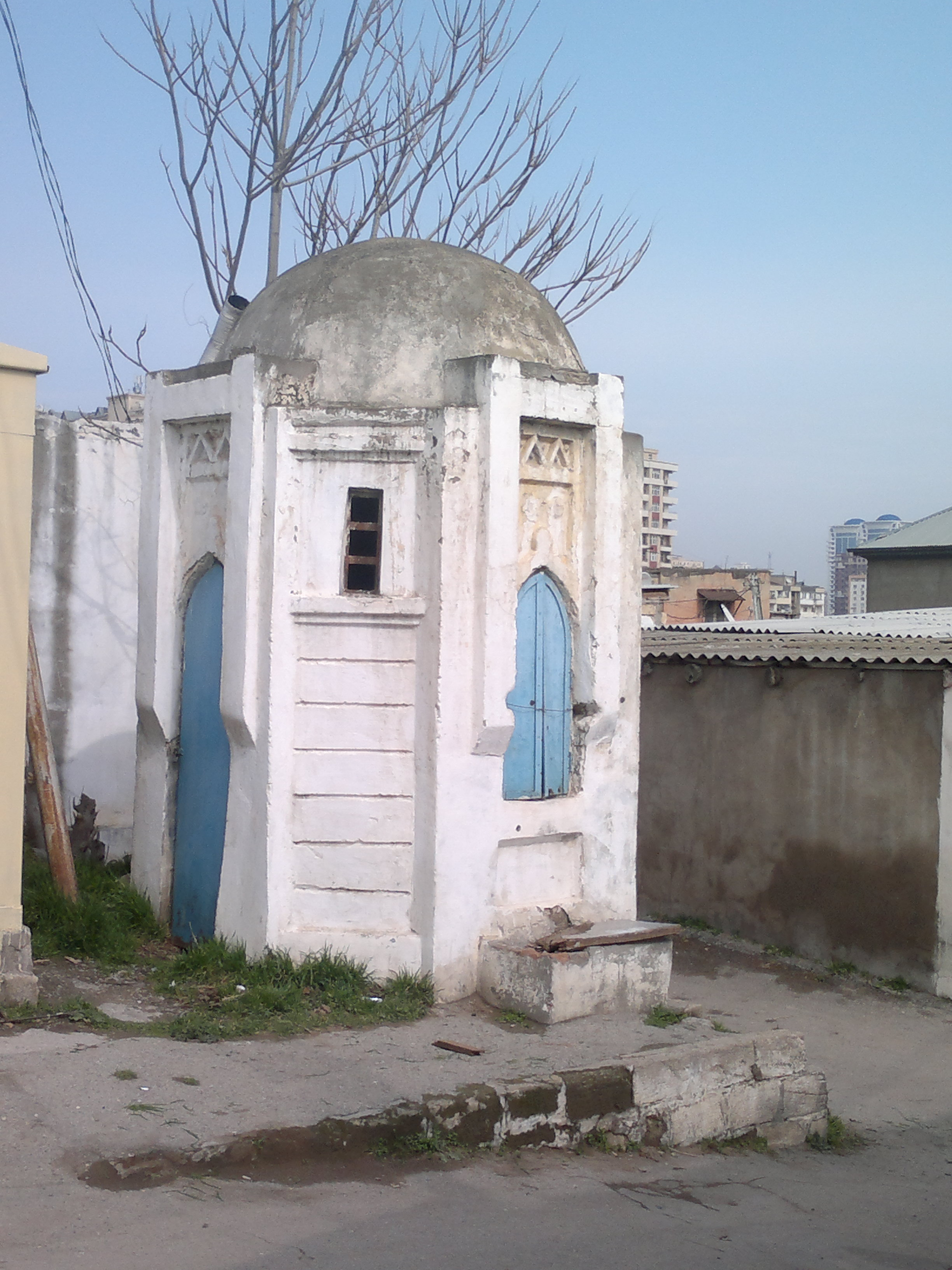
Cross of Salatin Asgarova and Abdulla Shaig streets

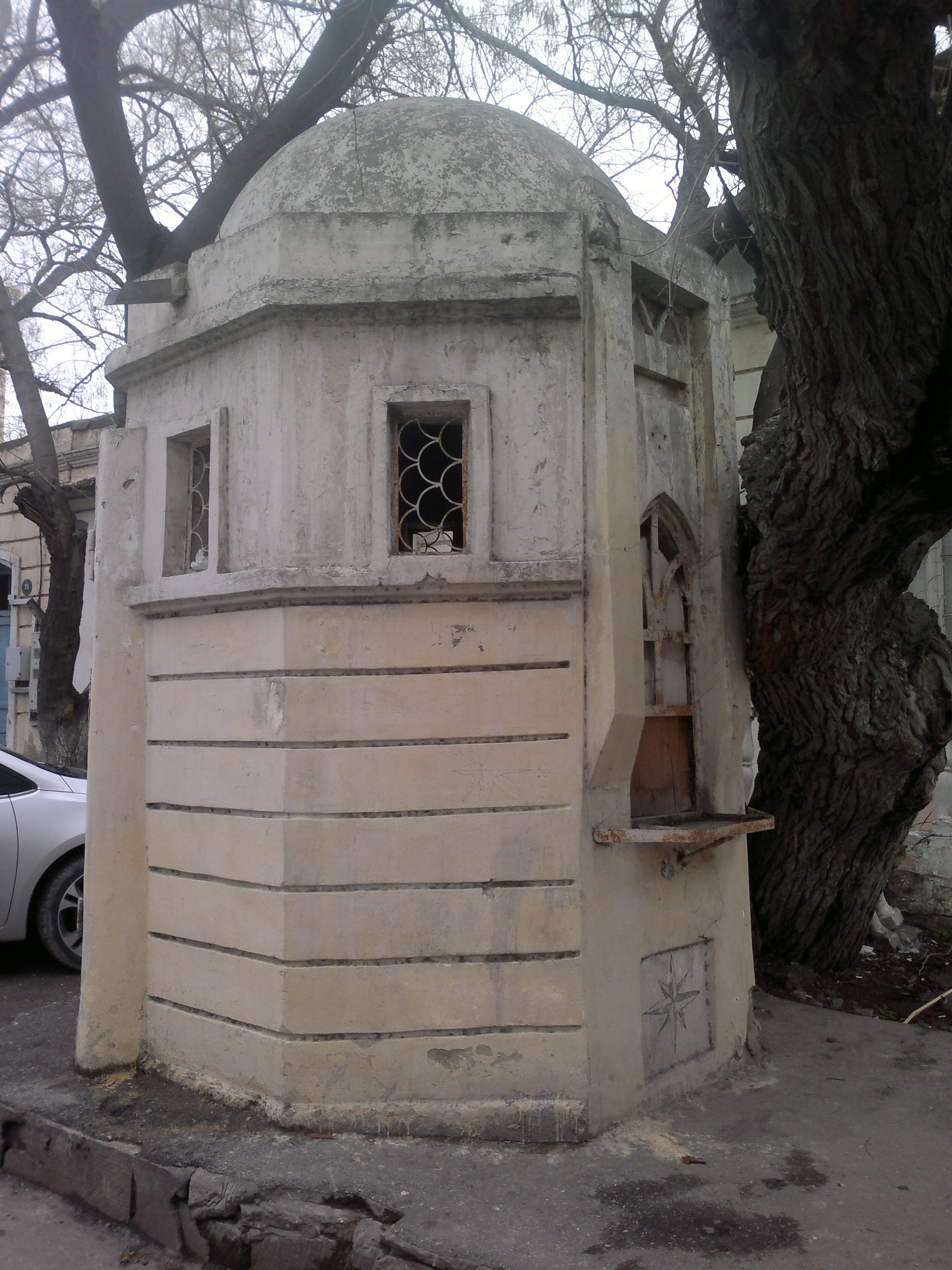
Cross of Shamil Azizbeyov and Rasul Rza streets

== Today's challenges ==
Access to dependable and clean drinking water remains a major issue for the majority of cities within Azerbaijan. In particular, the Absheron peninsula lacks a source of potable water, as its groundwater is contaminated and polluted. Azerbaijan imports bottled drinking water from other nations such as Iran, Turkey, and the United Arab Emirates, but the country actually has enough domestic water sources to avoid importing water, according to Parviz Moin, an Iranian fluid dynamicist.

Moin conducted research on whether Shollar water could be used as a source in the bottled water operation. After Moin took a sample from the Shollar spring and sent it to Germany for testing, German scientists confirmed that the Shollar water was an "excellent source of drinking [water]."

Modern water bottling from the Shollar pipeline began on 1 July 1997. Using Taghiyev's original pipeline and local workers, the operation sells water throughout Azerbaijan. The company even expanded its resources and currently bottles soft drinks, including cola and orange-flavored soda.
