= Araz Musayev =

Azerbaijani kickboxer

- Born: November 6, 1977 (age 47); Luran, Masally, Azerbaijan SSR
- Nationality: Azerbaijani
- Weight: 138–200 lb (63–91 kg; 9 st 12 lb – 14 st 4 lb)
- Fighting out of: Baku, Azerbaijan
- Team: Rabitachi (Azerbaijani: Rabitəçi)
- Years active: 1994–present
- Military career
- Rank: Lieutenant colonel

Araz Furgan oghlu Musayev (Azerbaijani: Araz Furqan oğlu Musayev; born November 6, 1977) is an Azerbaijani Muay Thai kickboxer.

Araz Musayev is a 9-time world and 3-time European champion in kickboxing. He is the vice-president of Azerbaijan Muay Thai and Thai Boxing federations. He holds the honorary title of Honored Master of Sports of Azerbaijan.

== Biography ==
Araz Musayev was born in 1977 in Luran village of Masally District.

He began his education in 1985 at the secondary school of Luran village of Masally District and graduated in 1995. In the same year he was admitted to the Faculty of Law of the Azerbaijan International University, in 1999 he graduated from the university and began his military service.

Araz Musayev started doing sports the age of 7 and started practicing professional sports in 1994, and four years later, in 1998, he began to succeed, thus taking second place in national championships. At the age of 27, in 2004, he became a world champion for the first time.

Araz Musayev has worked in the State Fire Control Service of the Ministry of Emergency Situations since 2007. He works as a senior specialist in the Department of Compulsory Fire Insurance of the State Fire Control Service of the Ministry of Emergency Situations and is a lieutenant colonel of the internal service.

He is married and has 2 children.

== Titles ==
World championships

- (gold) WTKA World Championships. Low kick style. 91 kg. (Carrara, Italy. 1–4 November 2012)
- (gold) WTKA World Championships. K1 style. -81 kg. (Carrara, Italy. 28–30 October 2011)
- (gold) 7th WMF World Championship. 81 kg. (Bangkok, Thailand. 18–26 March 2010)
- (gold) 6th WMF World Championship. 81 kg. (Bangkok, Thailand. 18–26 March 2009)
- (gold) 3rd IMGC Games. World Championships. 71 kg. (Bangkok, Thailand. 12–18 April 2008)
- (gold) WPKA World Games of Fighting Sports & Martial Arts. World Championships. Oriental. (Cyprus, March 2005)
- (gold) WPKA World Championships. (Corfu, Greece. 5–9 May 2004)
- (gold) WPKA World Championships. (Corfu, Greece. 5–9 May 2004) (another division)
- (bronze) WPKA World Championships. Oriental. 70 kg. (Thessaloniki, Greece. May 2007)
- (bronze) WPKA World Championships. (Rhodes, Greece. May 2000)

European championships

- (gold) WPKA European Championships. Full contact style. -64.5 kg. (14–18 October 2004, Dundee, Scotland)
- (gold) WPKA European Championships. Low-kick style. -67 kg. (14–18 October 2004, Dundee, Scotland)
- (gold) 3rd Euriasian championships. Strongest kickboxers in Ukraine tournament. Light contact style. 63 kg. (Ukraine, 4–6 September 1998)
- (silver) WPKA European Championships. (Hungary, 10–13 November 2003)
- (bronze) WPKA European Championships. (Hungary, 10–13 November 2003) (another division)
- (bronze) WAKO European Championships. Full contact style. 60 kg. (Moscow, Russia. 22–26 November 2000)
- (bronze) IAKSA Cup of Slavic States. Full contact style. 63.5 kg. (Sochi, Russia. 17–18 August 2001)

Azerbaijan championships

- (gold) Azerbaijan Kickboxing Championships. 63.5 kg. (MYST) (Baku, April 2001)
- (gold) 6th Azerbaijan Kickboxing Championship. 63.5 kg. (MYST) (Baku)
- (gold) 7th Azerbaijan Kickboxing Championship. 63.5 kg. (MYST) (Baku, April 2002)
- (gold) Azerbaijan Kickboxing Championships. 67 kg. (AKMF) (Baku, 7–9 April 2006)
- (gold) Azerbaijan Wushu (Sanda) Championships. 70 kg. (IWF) (Baku, 6–7 June, 1998)
- (silver) Azerbaijan Kickboxing Championships. 63.5 kg. (WAKO, AKMF) (Baku, 15–16 April 2000)
- (silver) Azerbaijan Kickboxing Championships. 63.5 kg. (AKMF) (Baku, 11–12 April 1998)
