= Yusifli, Jalilabad =

Settlement in Jalilabad District, Azerbaijan

Yusifli is a village and municipality in the Jalilabad Rayon of Azerbaijan. It has a population of 239.
