= Musakücə =

- Municipality
- Location within Azerbaijan
- Coordinates: 39°00′31″N 48°41′56″E
- Country: Azerbaijan
- Rayon: Masally

Population
  - Total: 3,322
- Time zone: UTC+4 (AZT)
  - Summer (DST): UTC+5 (AZT)

Musakücə (also, Musakyudzha) is a village and municipality in the Masally Rayon of Azerbaijan. It has a population of 3,322.
