= Güləbird =

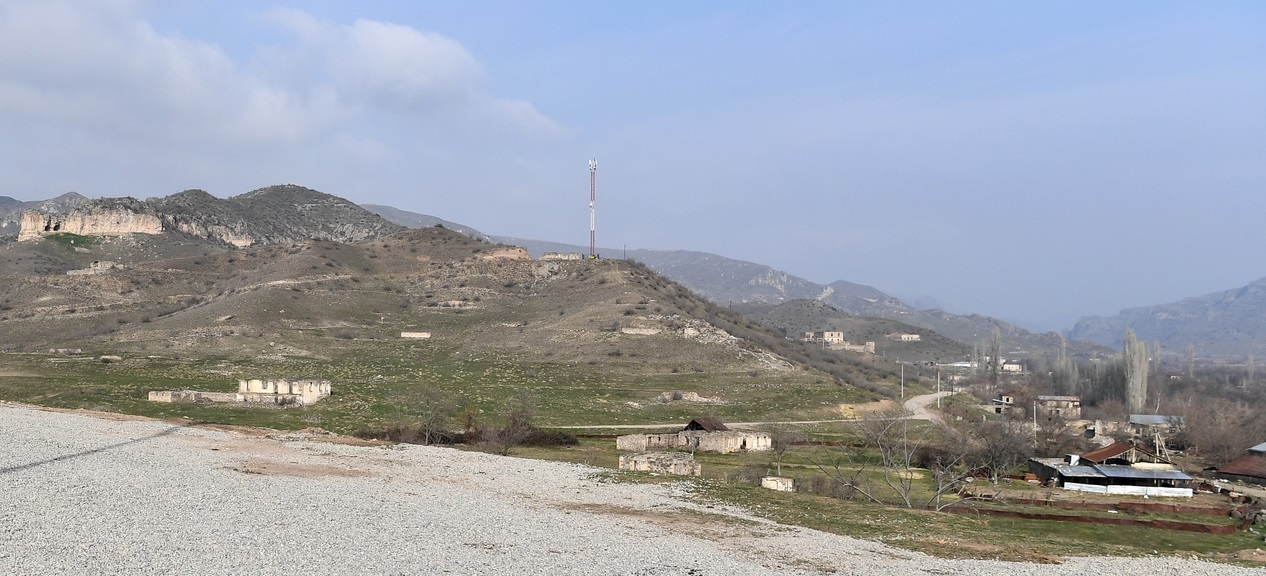

- Location within Azerbaijan Location within East Zangezur Economic Region
- Coordinates: 39°28′48″N 46°36′31″E
- Country: Azerbaijan
- District: Lachin

Population (2015)
  - Total: 221
- Time zone: UTC+4 (AZT)

Güləbird (Gulabird) or Tsaghkaberd (Armenian: Ծաղկաբերդ, lit. 'castle of flowers') is a village in the Lachin District of Azerbaijan.

== History ==
Gulabird, then called Kulaberd in Armenian (Armenian: Կուլաբերդ), was the easternmost fortification of the Armenian Principality of Kapan (1722–1730) formed by the commander Davit Bek following the Syunik Rebellion, it is also where the modern-day village gets its name.

The village was located in the Armenian-occupied territories surrounding Nagorno-Karabakh, coming under the control of ethnic Armenian forces in August 1993 during the First Nagorno-Karabakh War. The village subsequently became part of the breakaway Republic of Artsakh as part of its Kashatagh Province, referred to as Tsaghkaberd (Armenian: Ծաղկաբերդ, lit. 'castle of flowers'). It was seized by Azerbaijan on 9 November 2020 during the Lachin offensive in the 2020 Nagorno-Karabakh war.

== Economy ==
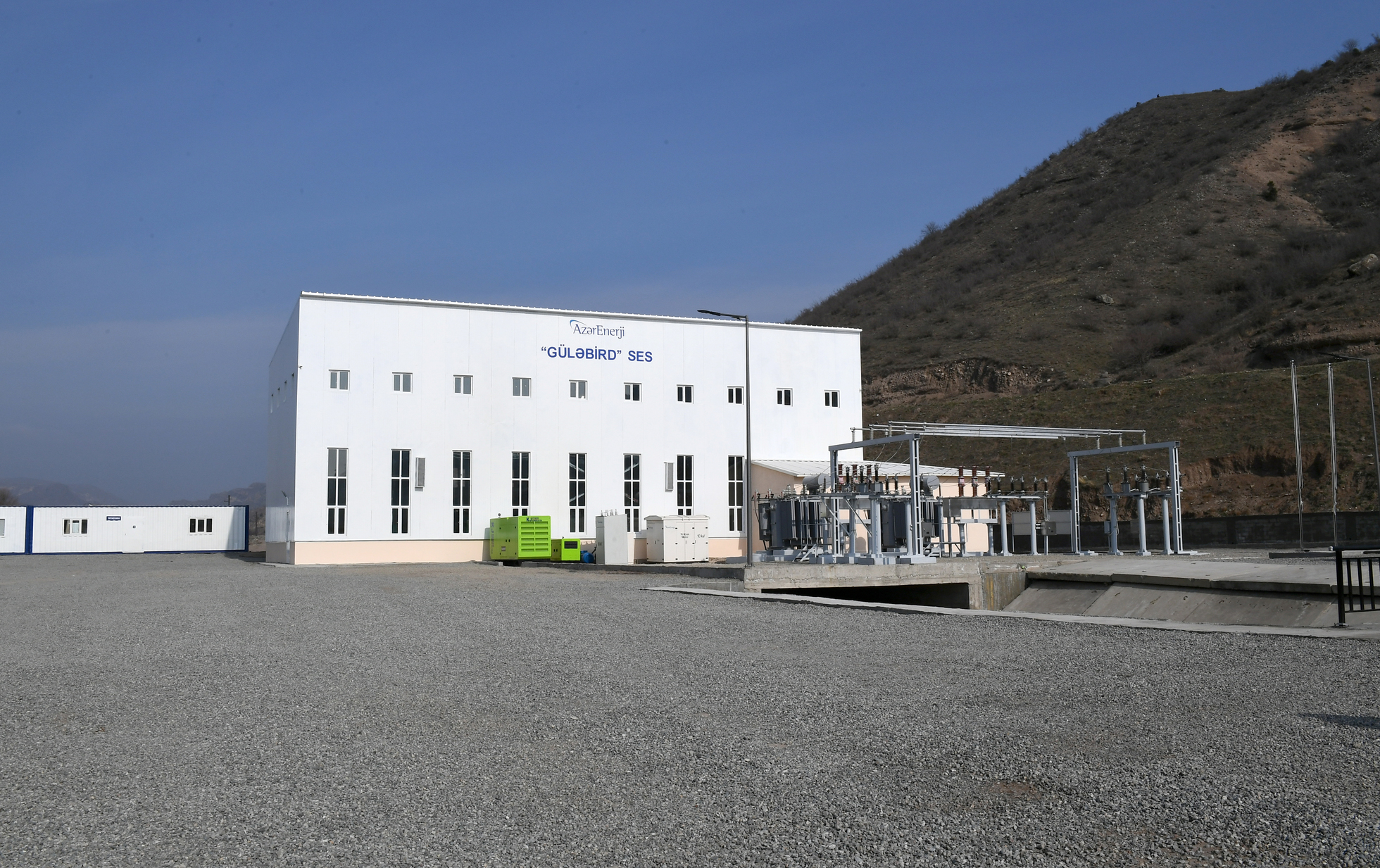
Gulabird hydroelectric power station on Hakari (river)

After returning to Azerbaijan control, the Gulabird hydroelectric power plant was declared reopened in 2021. It is a small 8 MW power plant.

== Historical heritage sites ==
Historical heritage sites in and around the village include a cave, the 12th/13th-century rock-cut church of Kronk (Armenian: Քրոնք), and the 17th/18th-century bridge of Kotrats (Armenian: Կոտրած).

== Demographics ==
The village had 271 inhabitants in 2005, and 221 inhabitants in 2015.

== See also ==
- List of power stations in Azerbaijan
