= Varvara, Azerbaijan =

Varvara
- Municipality
- Location within Azerbaijan
- Coordinates: 40°40′40″N 47°05′30″E
- Country: Azerbaijan
- Rayon: Yevlakh

Population
  - Total: 1,634
- Time zone: UTC+4 (AZT)
  - Summer (DST): UTC+5 (AZT)

Varvara is a village and municipality in the Yevlakh Rayon of Azerbaijan. It has a population of 1,634.

== Notable natives ==
- Fariz Madatov — National Hero of Azerbaijan.
