= Azerbaijan Thermal Power Plant =

Oil-fired power plant in Mingachevir, Azerbaijan

Coordinates: 40.7800°N 46.9910°E

Azerbaijan Thermal Power Plant is an oil-fired power plant consisting of 8 units, each with 300 MW generation capacity, at Mingachevir, in central Azerbaijan. The units were inaugurated step by step from 1981 and 1990 and were built by Taganrog (boiler), LMZ Russia (turbine) and Electrosila (generator). Qarabag Canal is the source of cooling water.

The chimneys of the plant are 320 metres tall.

== See also ==
- List of power stations in Azerbaijan
