= Şollar =

- Municipality
- Location within Azerbaijan
- Coordinates: 41°38′30″N 48°40′07″E
- Country: Azerbaijan
- Rayon: Khachmaz

Population
  - Total: 1,433
- Time zone: UTC+4 (AZT)
  - Summer (DST): UTC+5 (AZT)

Şollar (also Shollar) is a village and municipality in the Khachmaz Rayon of Azerbaijan. It has a population of 1,433. The municipality consists of the villages of Şollar and Çaxçaxlı.
