= Shamkir Hydroelectric Power Station =

Hydroelectric power station in Shamkir, Azerbaijan

Shamkir Hydro Power Plant
- Country: Azerbaijan
- Location: Shamkir
- Coordinates: 40.9465°N 46.1704°E
- Status: Operational
- Owner: Azerenerji
- Operator: Azerenerji

Thermal power station
- Primary fuel: Hydropower

Power generation
- Nameplate capacity: 50 MW (67,000 hp)

The Shamkir Hydro Power Plant is one of Azerbaijan's largest hydro power plants having an installed electric capacity of 380 megawatts (510,000 hp). It is located on Shamkir reservoir, which is built on the Kura River, in Shamkir Rayon of Azerbaijan, and is owned by Azerenerji, the state-owned electric power company of Azerbaijan.

== See also ==
- List of power stations in Azerbaijan
