= Araz, Azerbaijan =

Araz
- Municipality
- Location within Azerbaijan
- Coordinates: 39°06′38″N 45°25′40″E
- Country: Azerbaijan
- Autonomous republic: Nakhchivan
- District: Babek

Population (2005)
  - Total: 246
- Time zone: UTC+4 (AZT)

Araz is a village and municipality in the Babek District of Nakhchivan, Azerbaijan. It is located on the left bank of the Aras River. Its population is busy with gardening, grain growing and animal husbandry. There is a secondary school in the village. It has a population of 246.
