= Mingachevir Dam =

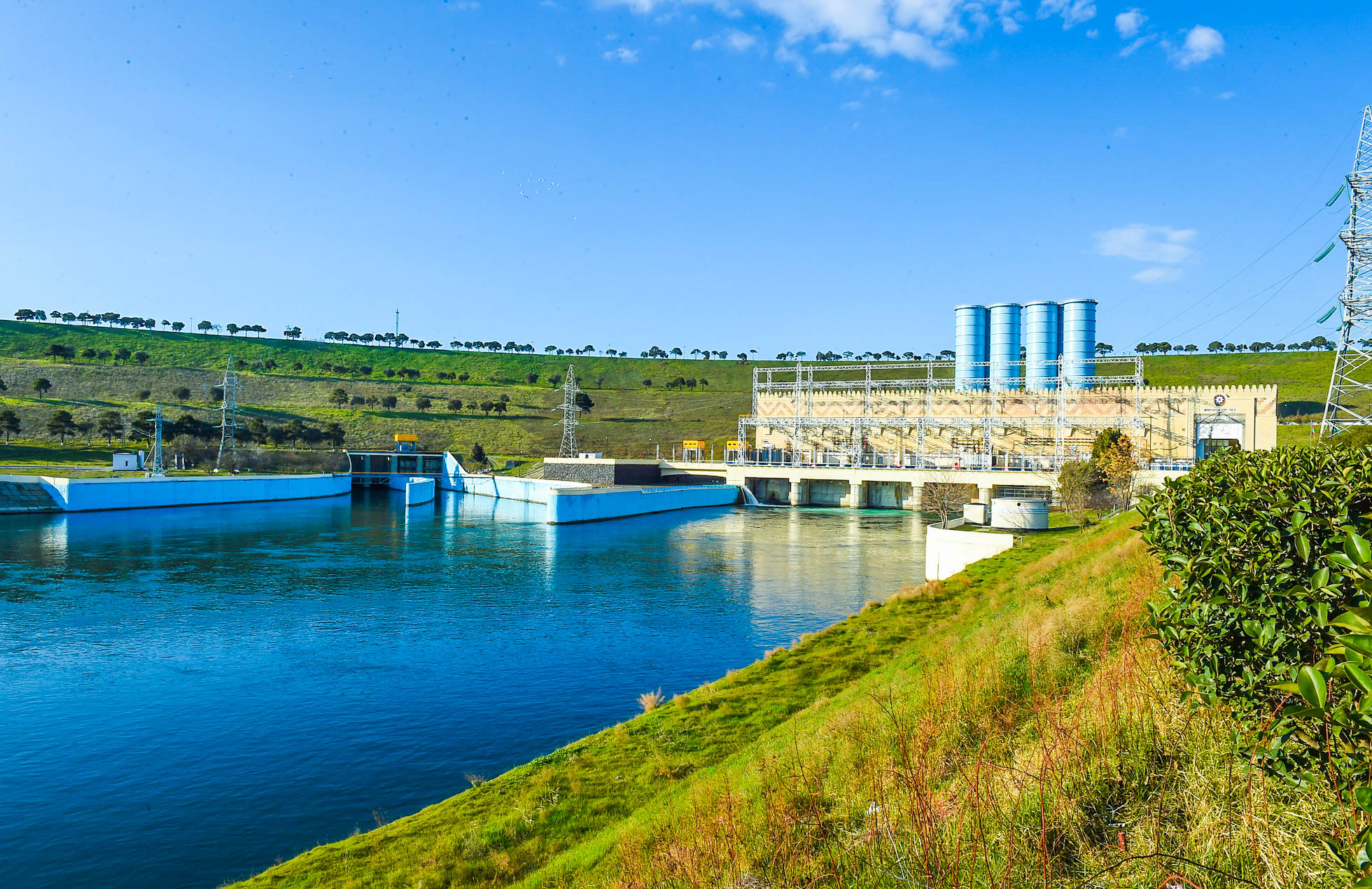

- Location within Azerbaijan
- Country: Azerbaijan
- Location: Mingachevir
- Coordinates: 40°47′24″N 47°1′42″E
- Purpose: Power, irrigation
- Status: Operational
- Construction began: 1945
- Opening date: 10.01.1954; 2015 years ago

Dam and spillways
- Type of dam: Embankment, earth-fill
- Impounds: Kura River
- Height: 80 m (260 ft)
- Length: 1,550 m (5,090 ft)

Reservoir
- Creates: Mingachevir reservoir
- Total capacity: 15.730 km^{3} (12,753,000 acre⋅ft)
- Active capacity: 9 km^{3} (7,300,000 acre⋅ft)
- Surface area: 605 km^{2} (234 sq mi)
- Maximum length: 70 km (43 mi)

Power Station
- Operator: Azerenerji
- Commission date: 1953/2000
- Type: Conventional
- Hydraulic head: 65 m (213 ft)
- Turbines: 6 x 70 MW Francis-type
- Installed capacity: 420 MW (560,000 hp)

The Mingachevir Dam (Mingachevir Hydro Power Station) is an earth-fill embankment dam on the Kura River just north of Mingachevir in Azerbaijan. It serves several purposes, including hydroelectric power production and water storage for irrigation. The Mingachevir reservoir, behind the dam, supplies water to the Upper Qarabag and Upper Sirvan channels which help irrigate about 1,000,000 ha (2,500,000 acres) of farmland in the country. Its six Francis turbine-generators were overhauled or replaced with 70 megawatts (94,000 hp) sets in 2000. Mingachevir reservoir has a storage capacity of 15.730 cubic kilometres (12,753,000 acre⋅ft), covering 605 km^{2} (234 sq mi). The length of the dam is 1,550 metres (5,090 ft), its width is 16 metres (52 ft) and height is 80 m (260 ft). It is the largest hydroelectric power station in the South Caucasus.

== History ==
The construction of the station started in 1945, the first hydro aggregate was put into operation in 1953. The main turbines were originally from the Japanese-built Fengman Hydropower Station in Manchukuo (now Northeast China), captured by the Red Army during the invasion of Manchuria in 1945. In 1954, the station was put into operation with full capacity.

A large number of people came from different regions of Azerbaijan due to the installation of Mingachevir hydroelectric power station. In total 20,000 people took part in the construction of the power station. Approximately 10,000 German prisoners of war were involved in the installation towards the end of the 1940s.

President Aliyev participated in the ceremony of commissioning of Mingachevir hydroelectric power station after reconstruction on February 27, 2018. All hydro generators and hydro turbines of the station were replaced with new ones within the framework of the reconstruction. As a result, the production capacity of the power station was increased from 284 MW to 424 MW.

== Technical parameters ==
The capacity of the Mingachevir HPP is 359 MW which has 6 hydroaggregates. Average annual electric power production is 1.4 billion kWh.

Water intersection includes concrete dam consisting of 3 holes (width of 30 m with an open channel), water intake facility to pressured water pipes consisting of 6 holes (length of 66 m), dam of land (Length 1550 m, height 80 m), device with 1 hole that intakes water to Upper Garabagh and Upper Shirvan canal.

== See also ==
- List of power stations in Azerbaijan
- Mingachevir reservoir
