= Lürən =

- Municipality
- Location within Azerbaijan
- Coordinates: 38°59′20″N 48°40′48″E
- Country: Azerbaijan
- Rayon: Masally

Population
  - Total: 869
- Time zone: UTC+4 (AZT)
  - Summer (DST): UTC+5 (AZT)

Lürən (also, Lyuran) is a village and municipality in the Masally Rayon of Azerbaijan. It has a population of 869.

== Əhalisinin məşğuliyyəti ==
Əhali əsasən kənd təsərrüfatı və maldarlıqla məşğul olur.
