= Yenikənd, Samukh =

Yenikənd
- Municipality
- Location within Azerbaijan
- Coordinates: 40°55′31″N 46°18′31″E
- Country: Azerbaijan
- Rayon: Samukh

Population
  - Total: 1,221
- Time zone: UTC+4 (AZT)
  - Summer (DST): UTC+5 (AZT)

Yenikənd (also, Yenikend) is a village and municipality in the Samukh Rayon of Azerbaijan. It has a population of 1,221.
