= Azerenerji =

Electric power company of Azerbaijan

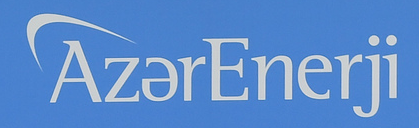
- Type: State-owned enterprise
- Industry: Electricity generation and transmission
- Founded: 1996
- Headquarters: Baku, Azerbaijan
- Area served: entire country
- Key people: Balababa Rzayev, CEO
- Website: www.azerenerji.gov.az

Azerenergy (Azerenerji Joint Stock Company (JSC)) is the largest electrical power producer in the Republic of Azerbaijan. It also maintains the largest distribution network in the country, although the regional power networks are being privatized. Azerenergy was recreated as a state-owned joint stock company in 1996, by decree of President Heydar Aliyev.

== History ==
In 1935 "Electrotok" Organization was separated from "Azneft" and transferred to the subordination of the Common Energy Office of "Bashenerji" of the USSR People's Commissariat of Heavy Industry ("Glavenergo"). Meanwhile, "Azenergy" Azerbaijan Territorial Energy Office was made on its base in 1935, by the order of the People's Commissariat of Heavy Industry of the USSR on 29 July. "Electrotok" Organization in conjunction with its associated ventures was included in the recently made "Azenergy" Azerbaijan Territorial Energy Office by the order of the Azneft Trust, number 23/138, on 15 August 1935. Officially "Azenergy" Azerbaijan Territorial Energy Office began its activity from 20 October 1935. "Azenergy" Energy Office of the National Economy Board of the Azerbaijan SSR was established in 1957, by the Decision of the Committee of Ministers of the Azerbaijan SSR number 292, on 8 June 1957.

The Common Office of Energy and Power under the Committee of Ministers of the Azerbaijan SSR was established in 1962, by the decision of the Committee of Ministers of the Azerbaijan SSR, number 808, on 16 October 1962.

The Common Energy and Power Office of the Soviet of Azerbaijan SSR ("Azglavenergo") was established in 1965, with the Decree of the Presidium of the Supreme Soviet of the Azerbaijan SSR on 20 October 1965.

"Azenergy" Generation Union was set up in 1970, with the Decision of the Council of Ministers of the Azerbaijan SSR, number 336, on 16 September in 1970. Committee of Ministers of the USSR accepted the recommendations for the reorganization of the Committee of Ministers of Azerbaijan SSR and "Azenergy" Production Union of the Service of Energy and Power of the USSR, in agreement with its decision number 196, on 26 March 1971.

The Common Production Union of "Azbashenerji" ("Azglavaenergo") of the Service of Energy and Power of the Azerbaijan SSR was canceled and "Azenergy" Production Union of Energy and Power of the Azerbaijan SSR (Decision number 154 / L, on 5 December 1988) was made on its base by the decision of the Service of Energy and Power of the USSR number 296a, on 3 August 1988.

By the arrangement of the Cabinet of Ministers of the Republic of Azerbaijan number 301, on the 14th of June in 1993, "Azenergy" Production Union of Energy and Power of the Azerbaijan SSR has considered to be the State Company, "Azerenergy" of the Electro-energetics and Power of the Republic of Azerbaijan in 1993, agreeing to the Decree of the president of Azerbaijan number 571, on 10 May 1993.

By the Order of the State Property Committee of Azerbaijan number 200, on 28 December 1996, "Azernergy" Open Joint Stock Company was built up, by offers being 100% possessed by the state at the introductory stage, and on 17 March 1997. It was enlisted at the Service of Justice of the Republic of Azerbaijan (State enrollment No. 2234) in 1996, under the Decree of the president Azerbaijan number 423 on 17 September 1996.

== Power generation ==
Azerenergy operates the following hydroelectric plants: Mingechevir Hydro Power Plant in Mingachevir on the Kura River, renovated in 2001, 360 MW; Varvara Hydro Power Plant at Varvara on the Kura River, 16 MW, in need of reconstruction; Shamkir Hydro Power Plant near Şəmkir on the Kura River, completed in 1982, 380 MW; Yenikand Hydro Power Plant, completed in 2000, 150 MW; Araz Hydro Power Plant; and Vaykhir. The 25 MW Fuzuli Hydro Power Plant is under construction in the Fizuli Rayon near the Bash Mil canal.

Majority of Azerenergy electrical generation is done at thermal power plants where fossil fuels, mostly heavy fuel oil and natural gas, are used to power steam turbines or gas turbines. Coal powered generation ceased in 1991. Azerenergy has no nuclear power nor geothermal generating capacity. The thermal power plants of Azerenergy are: Azerbaijanskaya, natural gas powered, under reconstruction, 2,400 MW; Shirvan; Shimal Power Plant; Baku ThermoPower Centre, cogeneration reconstruction completed in 2001, 110 MV; Severnaya Gas Combined Cycle Power Plant; Babek Power Plant; Astara Power Plant; Shaki Power Plant; Khachmaz Power Plant, natural gas powered, completed 2006, 90 MW; Nakhichevan Power Plant; Baku 3 Power Plant, natural gas powered, completed in 2007, 108 MW; Sangachal Power Plant; Shahdagh Power Plant; and Sumgait Power Plant.

== See also ==
- Yusif Kerimov
- Utilities in Azerbaijan
