= History of Mingachevir =

The area now known as Mingachevir, Azerbaijan has been inhabited by humans since the 3rd millennium BC.

== Pre-20th century ==
The largest archeological complex in the South Caucasus, consisting of four human settlements and three large cemeteries, dating from the 3rd millennium BC until the 17th century AD, is situated on the foot of Mount Bozdağ on both banks of the Kura River. Monuments revealed earliest here, that is, burials from the 3rd millennium BC, are associated with the Kuro-Araxes Chalcolithic. Another group of monuments belongs to the Khojaly-Gadabay culture, dating back to the end of the 2nd and the start of the 1st millennia. A notable amount of funeral complexes are from the Early Iron Age, dating back to the 8th–2nd centuries BC.

Two settlements from the 3rd–13th and one more from the 14th–17th centuries belong to the Middle Ages-era monuments found on the city's territories. They consist of Albanian Christian temples of the 5–8th centuries, Christian- and Muslim-style burials, among other things, including a stone basis for a cross and fragments from ceramic candlesticks with Albanian inscriptions.

During archeological excavations taken place in parallel between 1946–1953 during the construction of the Mingachevir Dam in Sudagilan a rich Albanian church complex was found dating back to the 5th–8th centuries, belonging to the early feudalism era: social buildings and churches with Albanian inscriptions; treasures consisting of Sasanid and Arabic coins. The church in Sudagilan consists of four layers, each from separate years: the topmost one is from the 8th–9th centuries, the next one was built in the 4th–6th centuries, and the last, bottommost one predates the 4th century, thus considered pagan. In the 8th–9th centuries, during an Arab invasion, the church was set on fire.
