= Mirzazade =

Mirzazade is a surname. Notable people with this surname include:

- Aydin Mirzazade — is a deputy in the National Assembly of Azerbaijan.
- Boyukagha Mirzazade — was a prominent Azerbaijani artist, named People's Artist of the Azerbaijan SSR in 1967.
- Khayyam Mirzazade — is an Azerbaijani composer and professor.
