= Trolleybuses in Mingachevir =

Trolleybus system in Mingachevir, Azerbaijan

Mingachevir trolleybus system

Operation
- Locale: Mingachevir, Azerbaijan
- Open: 15 April 1989
- Close: 31 March 2006
- Status: Closed
- Lines: 3 (max)

Infrastructure
- Stock: 17 (max)

The Mingachevir trolleybus system was a system of trolleybuses forming part of the public transport arrangements in Mingachevir, the fourth most populous city in Azerbaijan, for about 15 years at the turn of the 21st century.

== History ==
The system was opened on 15 April 1989. At its height, it consisted of three lines. The only remaining line was closed on 31 March 2006.

== Services ==
The three lines operating at the height of the system were as follows:

1. Садоводческое хозяйство (Horticultural Industry) — посёлок АзГРЭС (AzGRÈS)
2. Варвары (Barbarians) — Депо (Depot) — Варвары (Barbarians)
3. Дормаш (Dormash) — Депо (Depot)

== Fleet ==
The Mingachevir trolleybus fleet comprised 17 vehicles of type ZiU-9. As of 2009, part of the fleet was still in the depot.

== See also ==
- History of Mingachevir
- List of trolleybus systems
- Trolleybuses in former Soviet Union countries
