= Mingachevir Polytechnic Institute =

Mingechevir Polytechnic Institute (MPI) (Azerbaijani: Mingəçevir Politexnik İnstitutu), sometimes written Mingecevir Polytechnic Institute, is a public institute of technology located in Mingechevir, Azerbaijan. It is a coeducational higher education institution, officially accredited and/or recognized by the Ministry of Education of Azerbaijan. Mingechevir Politexnik Institutu (MPI) offers courses and programs leading to officially recognized higher education degrees such as bachelor's degrees in several areas of study.

The university has two departments, approximately 1200 students, including a dozen graduate students, and a faculty and staff of approximately 150.

Founded in 1990 as a satellite branch of the Azerbaijan State Oil Academy, it was called the Azerbaijan Industrial University until 1992 when it became independent as the Mingechevir Energy Institute. In 1993, it was renamed Mingechevir Polytechnic University.

== History ==
Mingachevir Polytechnic Institute was the branch of the University of Industry named after M. Azizbayov was established and started to operate (now Azerbaijan State Oil and Industry University) according to decision N274 of the Cabinet of Ministers of the Republic of Azerbaijan dated April 23, 1991. Later, on July 1, 1992, by the decision of the Cabinet of Ministers N371, the branch became Mingachevir Institute of Energy and renamed to Mingachevir Polytechnical Institute on August 4, 1993, according to the resolution N 427 of the cabinet of Ministers of the Republic of Azerbaijan. Mingachevir State University was established according to resolution N1335 dated July 24, 2015, signed by the President of Azerbaijan, on the basis of Mingachevir Polytechnic Institute functioning within the Ministry of Education of the Republic of Azerbaijan, on purpose of carrying out personnel training at all levels of higher education.

== Faculty Departments ==
- Engineering and mechanics
- Economics and Management

=== Majors ===
- Land transportation engineering
- Organization and management of the industry
- Mechanical engineering
- Computer science
- Heat and power engineering
- Economy
- Systems engineering and information technology
- Electroenergetics engineering
- Ecology engineering

== Campus ==
The campus of Mingachevir Polytechnic Institute is located in Mingechevir, Azerbaijan along with most of the faculties, and the central library the university laboratories, computer center. The computer center was reconstructed from 1997 to 1998. The Center consists of 3 computing techniques laboratory and lecture room. The institute's library and reading room provide students with books in all majors. The institute has a sport and health complex and a medical center with an area of over 1200 square meters.
