= Mingachevir archaeological complex =

Archaeological complex in Mingachevir, Azerbaijan

- Mingəçevir arxeoloji kompleksi (Azerbaijani)
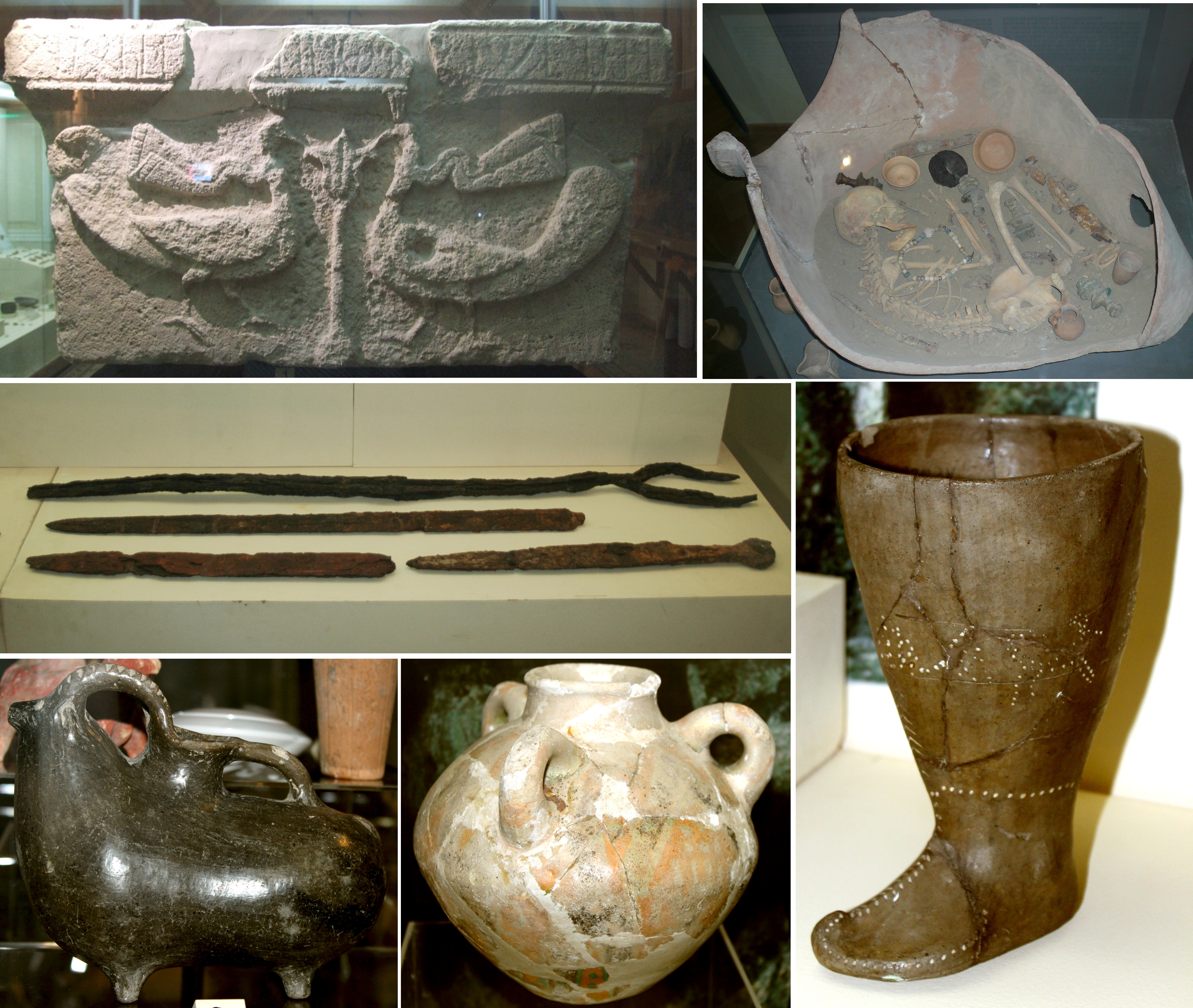
- Finds from Mingachevir in the National Museum of History of Azerbaijan
- Interactive map of Mingachevir archaeological complex
- 40.781694°N 47.039165°E
- Type: Settlements and burial grounds
- Periods: Early Bronze Age to the late Middle Ages
- Location: Southern slopes of the Bozdağ ridge, on both banks of the Kura River, Azerbaijan

Site notes
- Excavation dates: 1946–1953
- Archaeologists: Saleh Gaziyev and others

The Mingachevir archaeological complex (Azerbaijani: Mingəçevir arxeoloji kompleksi) is an archaeological complex located on the southern slopes of the Bozdag ridge, on both banks of the Kura River in Azerbaijan. Dating from the Early Bronze Age (3rd millennium BC) to the late Middle Ages (17th century), it is one of the largest archaeological complexes in the South Caucasus. The complex consists of four settlements and four major burial grounds.

== Excavations and research ==
A detailed and comprehensive study of the archaeological sites at Mingachevir began in 1935, when research was undertaken by the Azerbaijani Branch of the Academy of Sciences of the Soviet Union. Large-scale archaeological excavations were carried out at Mingachevir between 1946 and 1953 under the direction of Saleh Gaziyev, in connection with the construction of the Mingachevir Hydroelectric Power Station. The work was considered urgent because parts of the archaeological area were expected to be flooded when the reservoir was filled. Between 1 April 1946 and 1 January 1948 alone, more than 650 burials were excavated and over 7,500 objects of historical significance were recovered.

Other researchers who participated at various times in the excavations at Mingachevir and the study of its archaeological remains included Yevgeni Pakhomov, Nina Minkevich-Mustafayeva, Rahim Vaidov, Vera Fomenko, Gardashkhan Aslanov, Gara Ahmedov and Gavriil Ione. Ione published several articles on the pottery kilns discovered at Mingachevir and also studied the dating of jar and pit burials and the distinctive boot-shaped vessels found in early burials. Pakhomov conducted research on the jar burials at Mingachevir. Minkevich-Mustafayeva conducted excavations in Square No. 2, where two pit burials and one jar burial were discovered.

== Archaeological sites ==
=== Settlements ===
==== Settlement No. 1 ====
Settlement No. 1 is located on a narrow strip along the right bank of the Kura River, where the river emerges from the gorge of the Bozdağ ridge. The settlement dates to the Bronze Age and was first investigated in 1950. Numerous fragments of pottery, pieces of obsidian and flint, and more than 300 flint and obsidian artefacts, including inserts, knives and arrowheads, dating to the Late Chalcolithic were discovered at the site. Excavations also revealed the remains of simple single-tier pottery kilns dating to the 1st millennium BC.

The floors of unidentified structures, resembling rammed-earth platforms, were also discovered on two hills within the settlement. Several pits contained complete black and grey pottery vessels as well as pottery fragments. Animal and fish bones and household objects, including querns, sinkers, stone moulds for casting bronze objects and lamps, were also found.

The lower layer of the settlement, together with burials dating to the 3rd millennium BC, belongs to the Kura–Araxes culture and represents the earliest archaeological remains at Mingachevir. The second layer belongs to the Khojaly–Gadabay culture and dates from the late 2nd to early 1st millennium BC, while the third layer dates to the Early Iron Age, from the 8th to the 2nd centuries BC.

==== Settlement No. 2 (Sudagylan) ====
Settlement No. 2 is located at Sudagylan, on the left bank of the Kura River, where it emerges from the Bozdağ gorge. The medieval settlement contains four cultural layers dating from the 1st to the 13th centuries. The earliest layer contained semi-subterranean dwellings, pottery and burials.

The second layer, dating from the 4th to 7th centuries, contained the remains of a Christian church. Stone slabs and pottery fragments bearing inscriptions in the Caucasian Albanian script were discovered there. Based on the inscriptions and coins found at the site, Vaidov dated the church to the 6th century.

A later Christian church, metal crosses and a hoard of 8th–9th-century Arab coins were found in the third layer. The uppermost layer dates from the 10th to 13th centuries and contained glazed pottery and medieval coins.

==== Settlement No. 3 ====
Settlement No. 3 is located at Kalaget, on the left bank of the Kura River near the entrance to the Bozdağ gorge. Its cultural deposits reach a depth of more than 6–7 metres in some areas and date from the 1st to the 12th centuries. The upper layer, dating from the 10th to 13th centuries, contained remains of residential and household structures destroyed by fire, together with pottery and other everyday objects.

An earlier layer, dated by coins to the 6th–9th centuries, contained mud-brick buildings, hearths, agricultural tools, animal and fish bones, cereal grains, cotton seeds and fruit stones. Finds from the settlement also include seals, bronze and iron fibulae, horse equipment, weapons and jewellery.

==== Settlement No. 4 ====
Settlement No. 4 is located on the right bank of the Kura River, 2–3 km south of the ancient burial ground. It was discovered in late 1949. The settlement dates mainly from the 14th to 17th centuries. Most surface finds consist of pottery dating from the 12th to 14th centuries. Remains of various structures were also discovered.
