= Mingachevir State University =

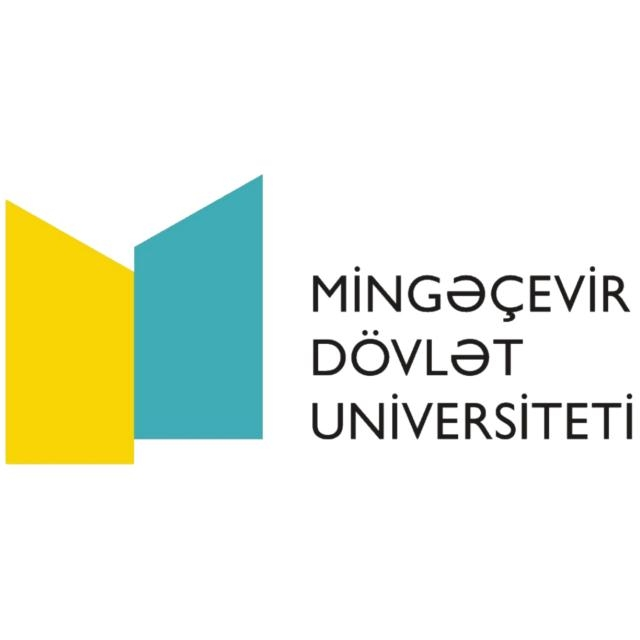
Mingachevir State University Logo

Mingachevir State University (MSU, Azerbaijani: Mingəçevir Dövlət Universiteti) is a public university located in Mingachevir, Azerbaijan.

== History ==
Azerbaijani President Ilham Aliyev has issued an order on establishment of Mingachevir State University. Mingachevir State University will be established on the basis of the Mingachevir Polytechnic Institute under the Education Ministry and ensure staff training on all levels of high education.
