= Mingachevir =

- City
- Azerbaijani: Mingəçevir
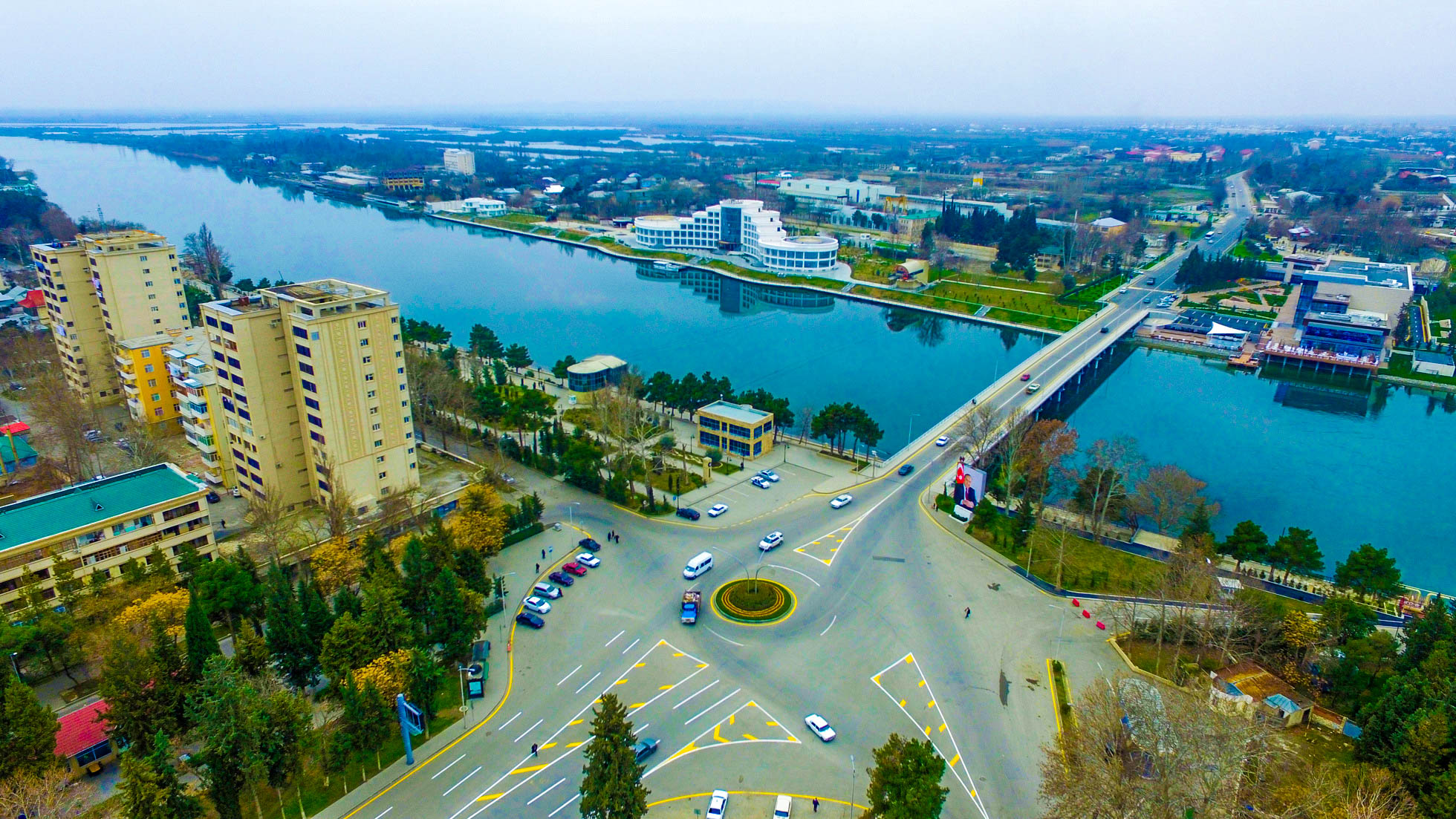
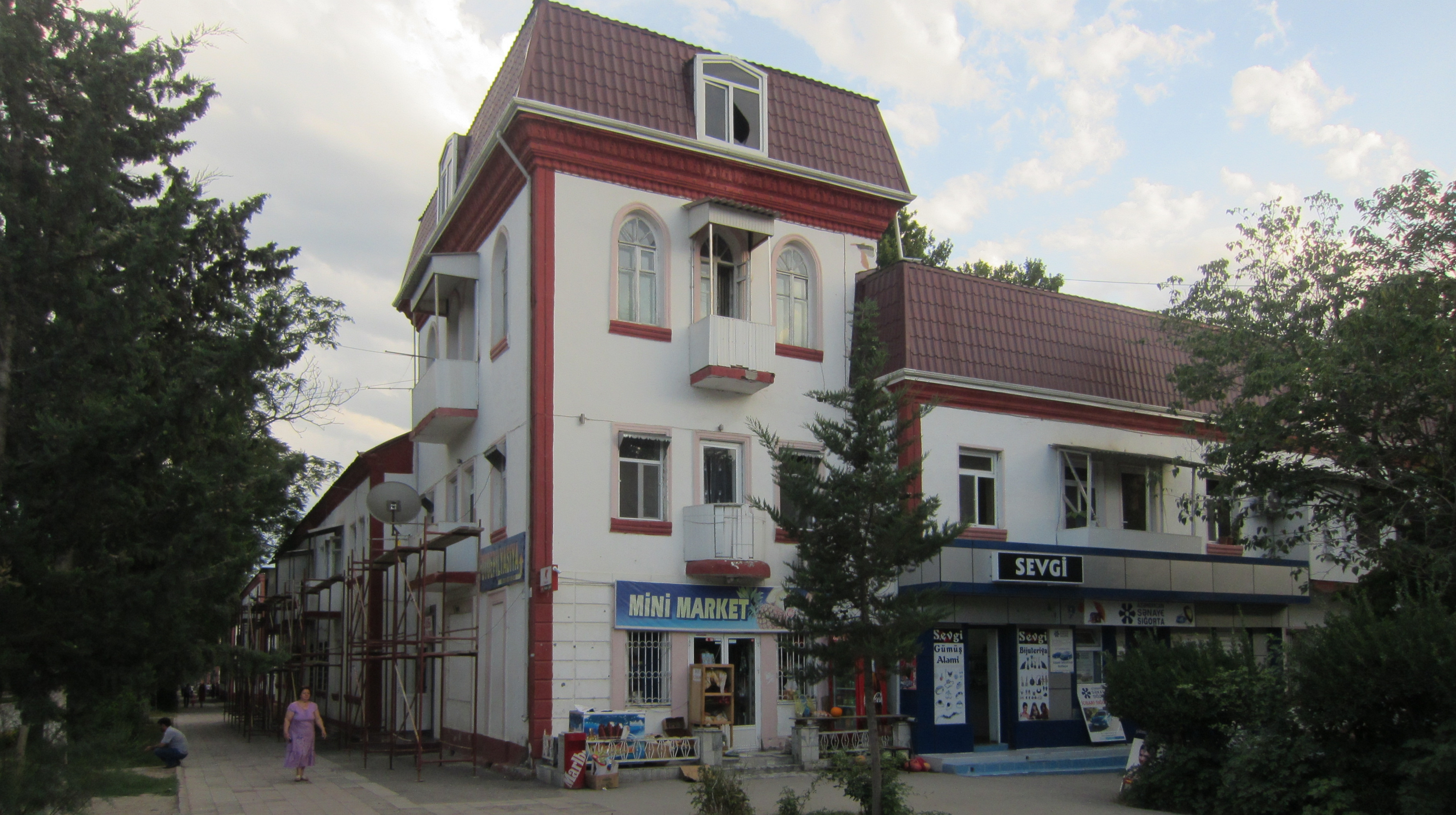
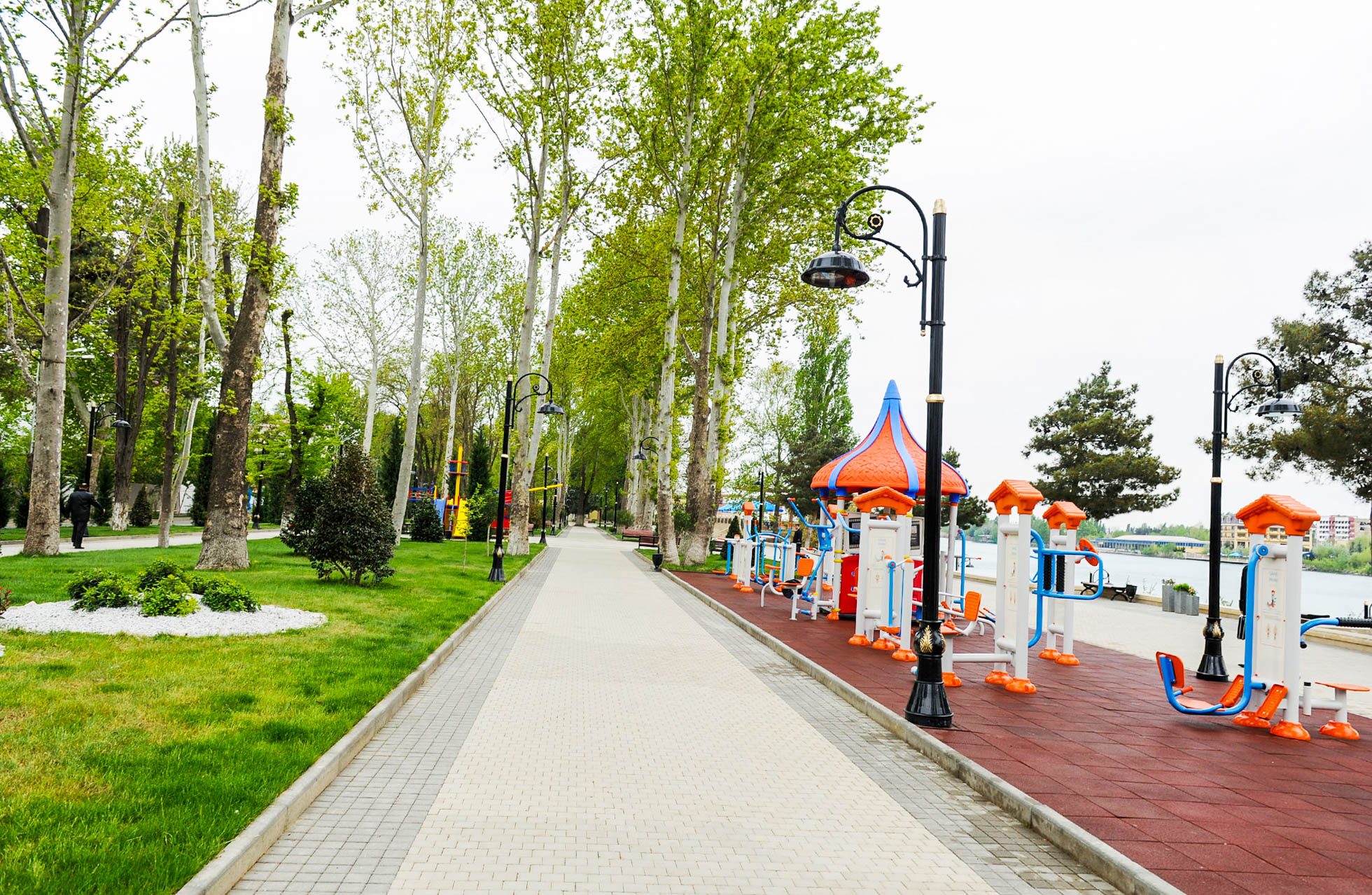
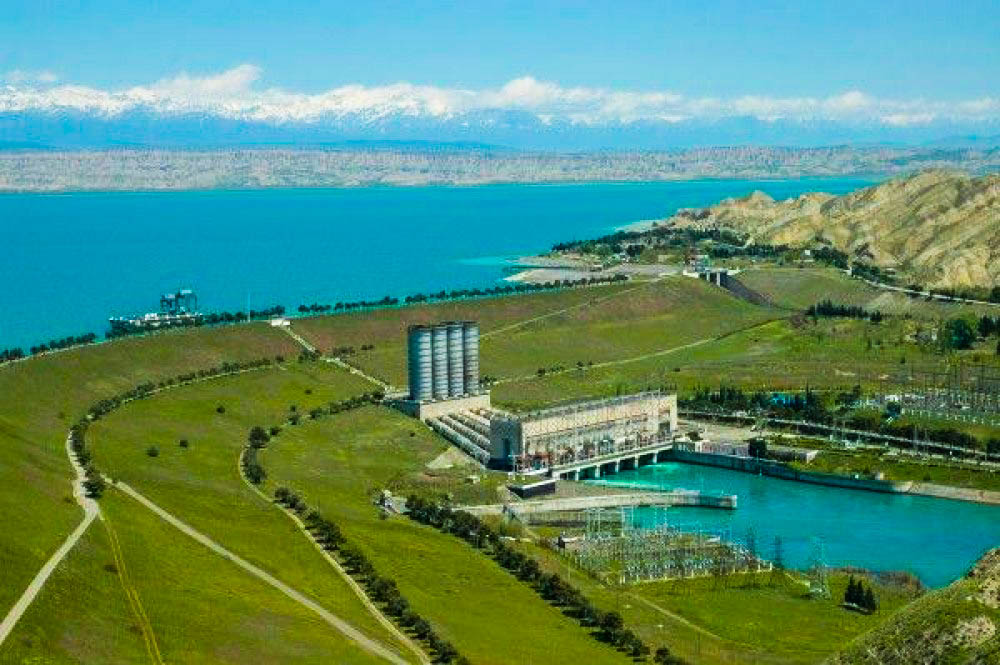
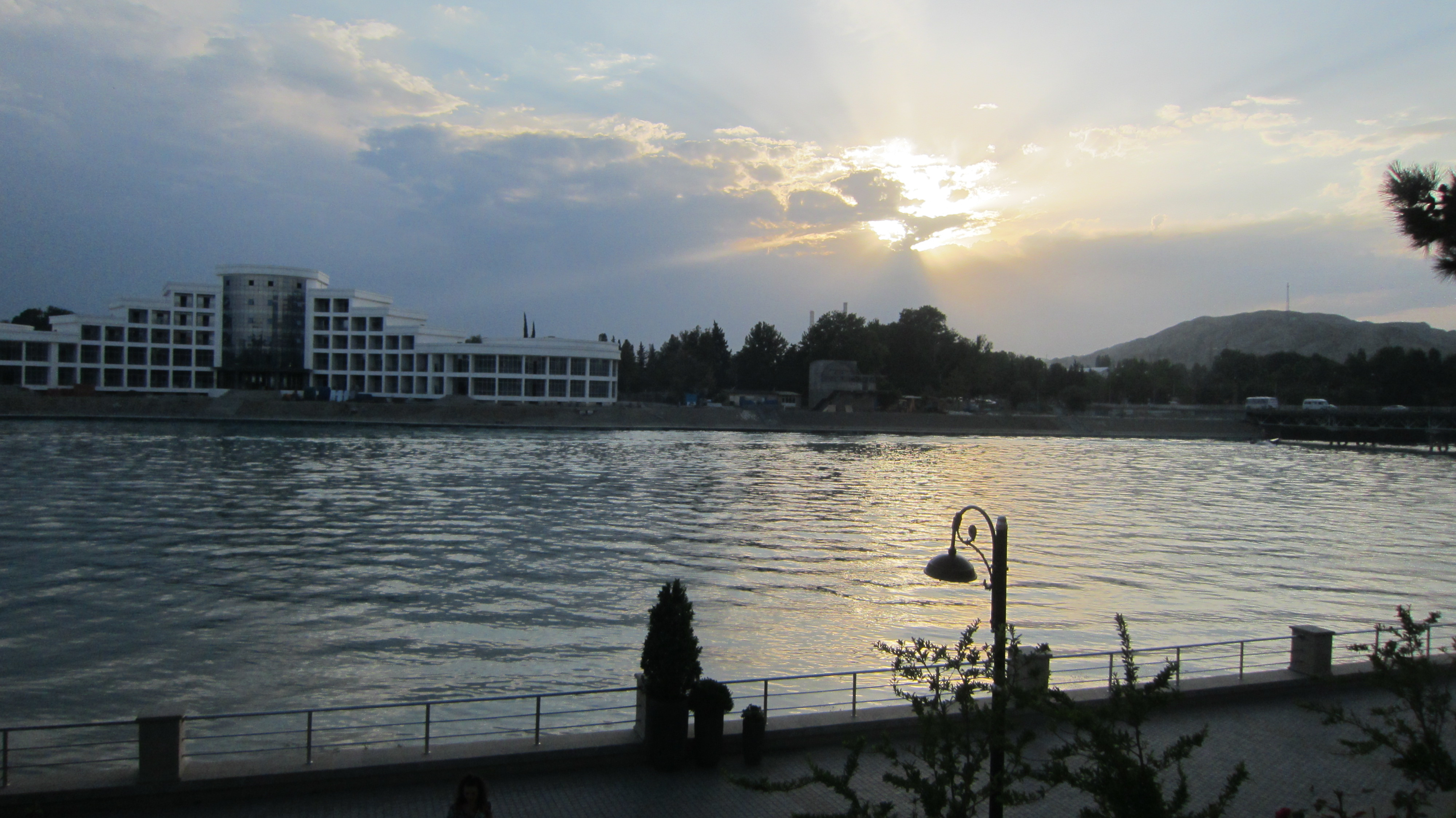
- Kura Kur Olympic Complex Tower Home built by German prisoners of war ASAN Service Boulevard Mingachevir Dam Youth home View of Mingachevir

- Coordinates: 40°46′12″N 47°02′56″E
- Country: Azerbaijan
- Region: Central Aran
- Founded: 1946

Government
  - Governor: Ilham Ismayilov

Area
  - Total: 130 km^{2} (50 sq mi)
- Elevation: 55 m (180 ft)

Population (2020)
  - Total: 106,048
  - Density: 820/km^{2} (2,100/sq mi)
  - Population Rank in Azerbaijan: 4th
- Time zone: UTC+4 (AZT)
- Website: mingechevir-ih.gov.az

Mingachevir (Azerbaijani: Mingəçevir) is the fourth largest city in Azerbaijan with a population of about 106,000. It is often called the "city of lights" because of its hydroelectric power station on the Kura River, which divides the city down the middle.

The current city was founded in 1948, partly by German prisoners of war captured during World War II. Mingechevir is also home to Mingachevir Polytechnic Institute. The city forms an administrative division of Azerbaijan. The district is located 323 km from the capital Baku and 17 km from the Baku-Tbilisi railway. Geographically, the region is located in the center of the republic, straddling the Kura River.

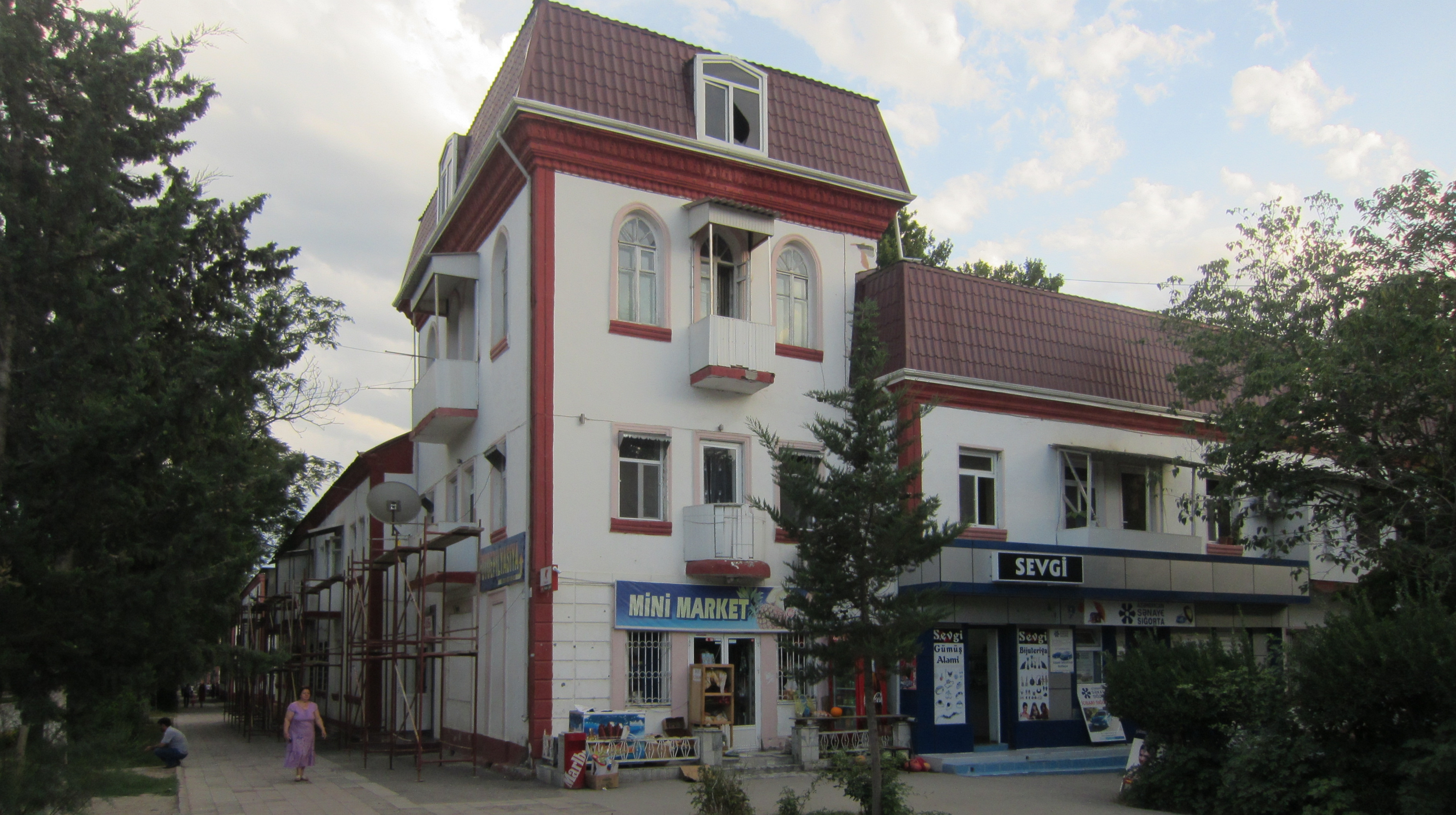
Mingachevir home built by German prisoners of war

== History ==
The archaeological history of this area extends from the eneolith era (3000 BC) to the AD 17th century. In 1871, Adolf Berge, chairman of the Caucasus archaeological committee, gave information about the archaeological monuments of Mingachevir at the second congress of archaeologists in St Petersburg, wrongfully presenting Mingachevir as an ancient settlement.

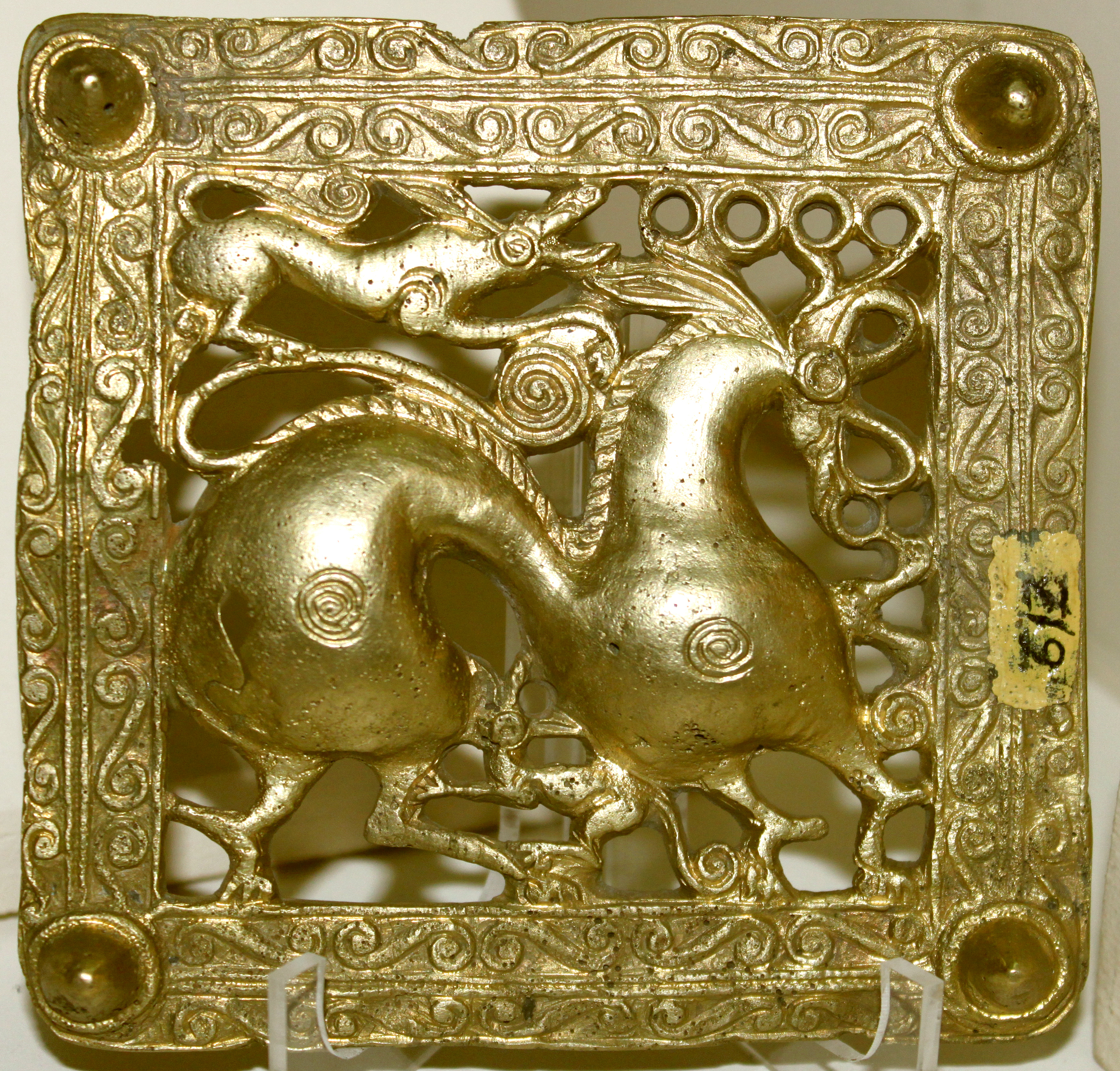
Gold Scythian belt title, Mingachevir (ancient Scythian kingdom), Azerbaijan, 7th century BC.

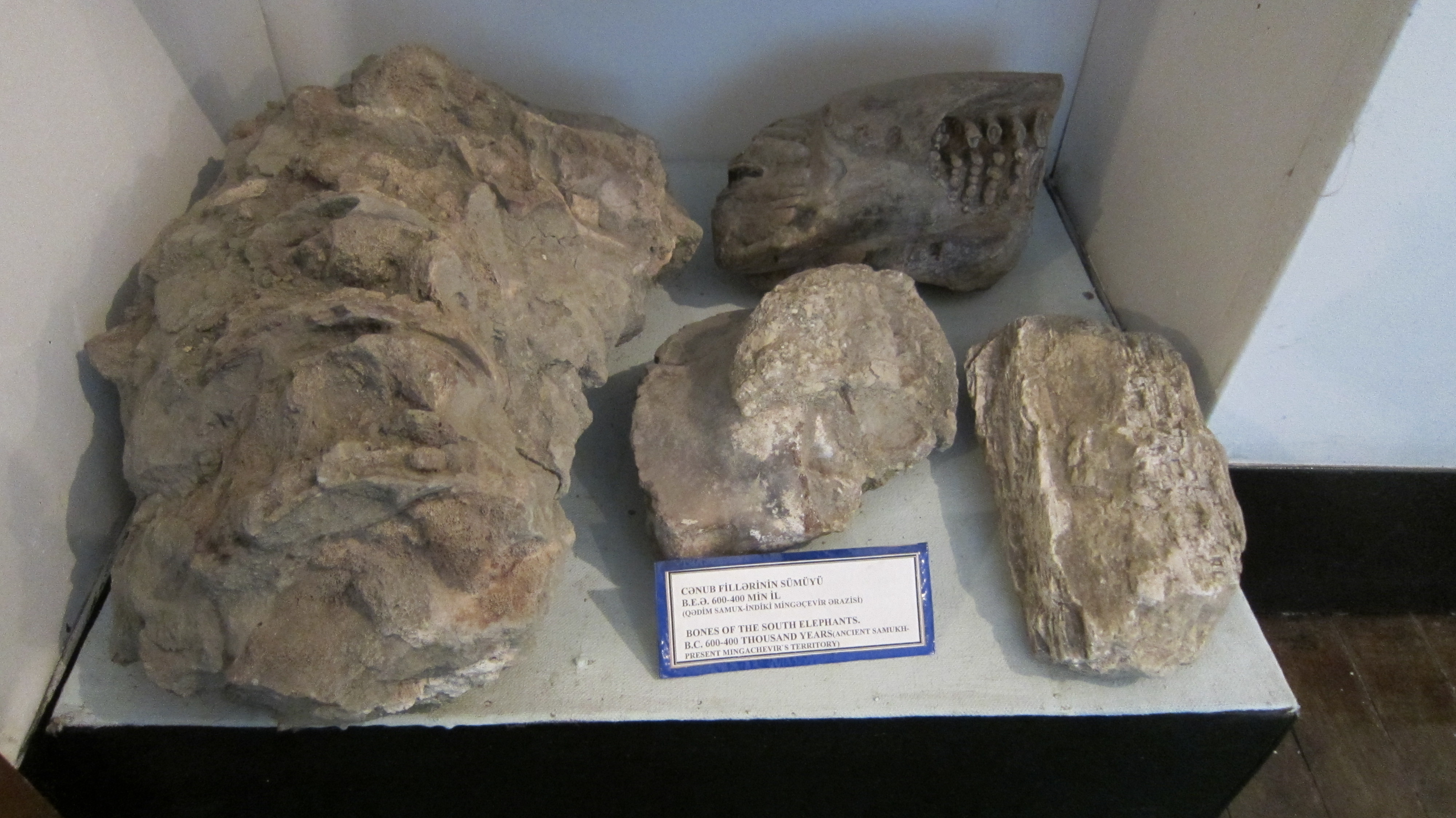
Bones of the south elephants B.C 600-400 thousand years (Museum of History Mingachevir)

After this, Mingachevir remained out of archaeologists' attention until the mid-1930s when archaeological researches resumed as part of the construction of the hydroelectric power station. In 1935, researches under the leadership of Prof. Pakhomov revealed two ancient settlements and cemeteries, which were composed of various types of graves. Unfortunately, World War II prevented the research from being completed.

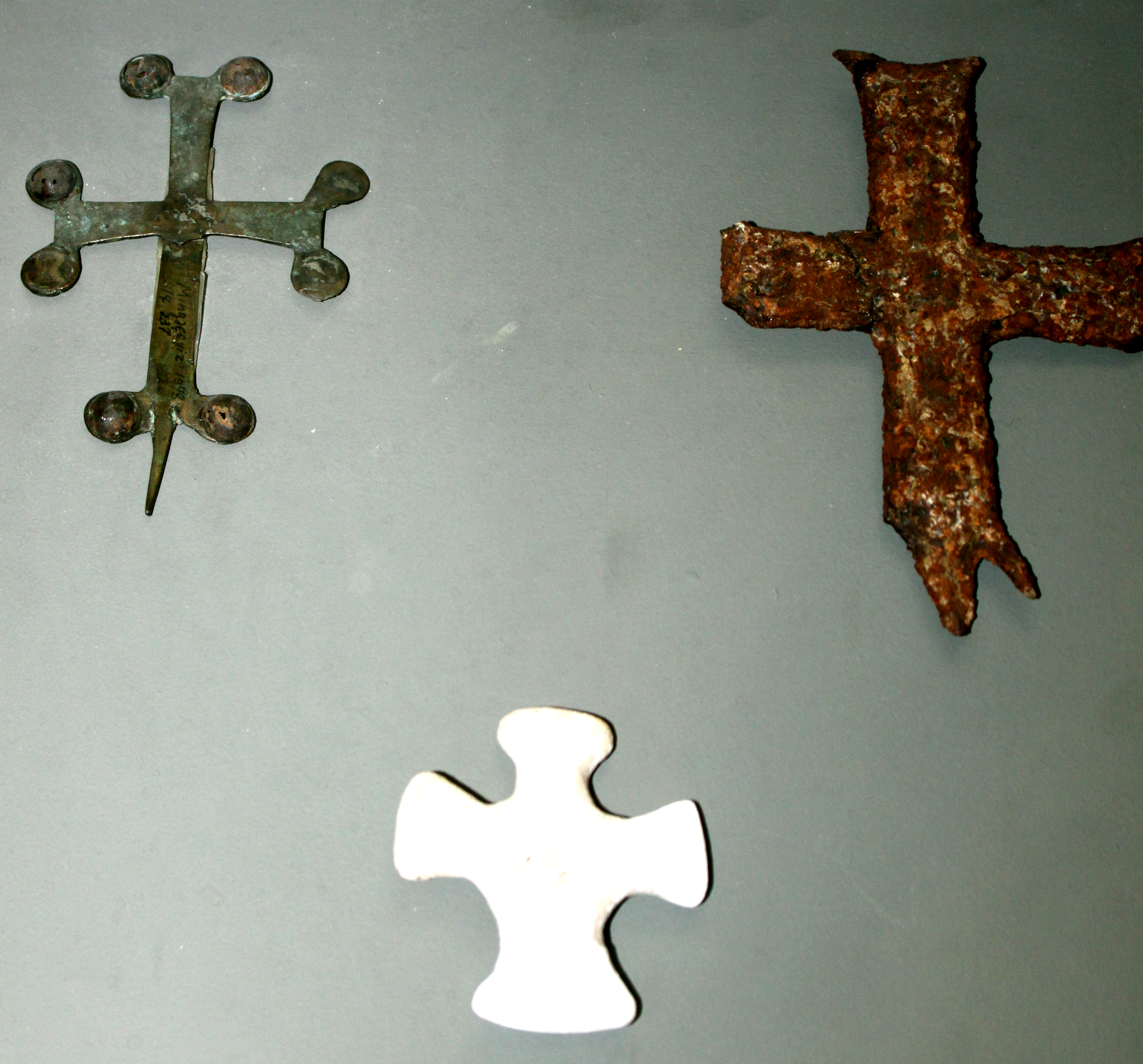
Crosses from Migachevir church complex, Caucasian Albania

The construction of the hydroelectric power station started immediately after the war. This marked the start of systematic and planned research of Mingachevir as an ancient settlement. Archaeological excavations were carried out from April 1946 to August 1953 by a group of archaeologists headed by S. M. Qaziyev in connection with the construction of the Mingachevir hydroelectric power station under a decision by the Supreme Board of the Azerbaijani Academy of Sciences.

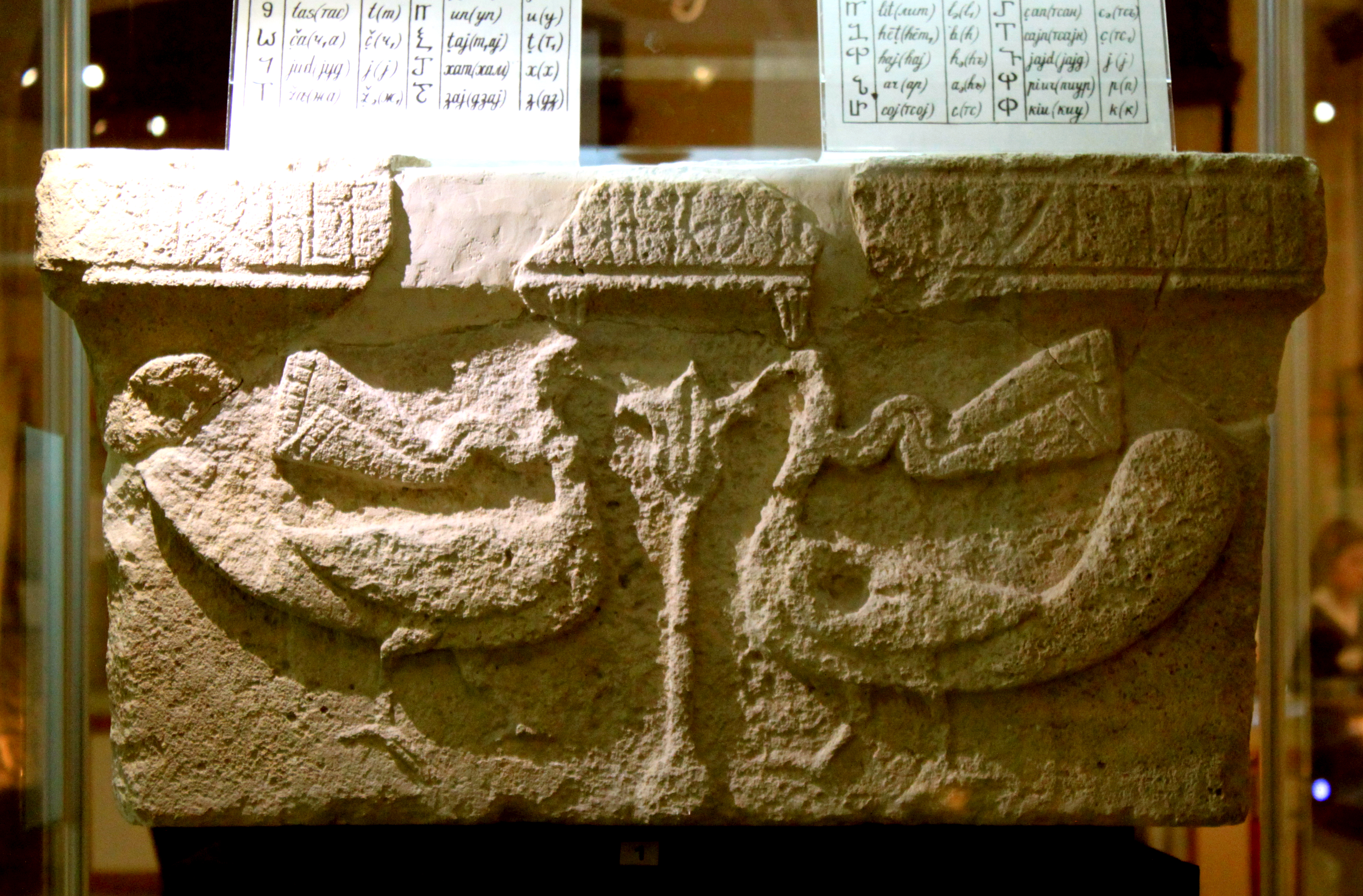
Base of a column with Albanian inscription, Caucasian Albania

Historical sources indicate that a fierce battle took place between the powerful army of Roman commander Pompey and the army of Albanian governor Oris just on the territory of the current dam on the bank of the Kura river in the 1st century BC.

Renowned Turkish traveller Evliya Çelebi, who lived in the 17th century AD, wrote about Mingachevir and described it as a large settlement on the right bank of the River Kur near the Bozdag Mountain. According to him, several mosques, workshops manufacturing fibre silk and silk cloth, bathhouses, etc., were operating in this settlement. The road passing from there used to be called the "road of the messenger". The "road of the messenger" connected camelcase and trade roads to Middle East countries and Azerbaijani towns like Saki, Qabala, Samaxi, Barda, Beylaqan, and others.

A significant number of people came to Mingachevir from all districts in Azerbaijan in connection with the construction of the Mingachevir hydroelectric power station, and a total of 20,000 people took part in the construction of this power station. About 10,000 German POWs were among those who contributed to the construction of the power station by the end of the 1940s. The most experienced specialists of the country were involved in the construction of this building site as the biggest hydroelectric power station of the then Soviet Union.

The area of the town is 139.53 km^{2}. Mingachevir is situated 55 meters above sea level on the foothill of the southeast of the Bozdag Mountain chain and on the edge of the Mingachevir reservoir in the Kur-Araz lowland in central Azerbaijan. The town was built in a mild and warm zone and has warm and dry summers and mild winters. The average annual temperature is 14 - 15 °C, highest temperature 42 °C (July–August) and the lowest temperature (January–February) -10 °C. The average annual rainfall is 250–300 mm.

The town lies on both banks of the Kura river - a 1515 km-long river, which is the biggest and longest one in the South Caucasus. Mingachevir is situated 280–300 km west of the capital of the republic, Baku.

Mingachevir has been developing rapidly over the last 54 years since it has been established. It is currently considered to be the fourth most developed city of the country both for its economic potential and the number of inhabitants, it is one of the most important cities of the republic in terms of energy, industry, science, education and culture. The number of able-bodied people in Mingachevir is 53,000, while the number of people actually involved in labour is 16,000. The number of people engaged in small-sized businesses stands at 4,000.

== Economy ==
As of 2008, Mingachevir fish farm functions in the city, which farms three types of fish: carp, silver carp and sturgeon.

=== Reservoir and Hydroelectric power station ===
The construction of the Mingachevir Dam creating the Mingachevir reservoir and Mingachevir Hydro Power Plant was completed in 1953. The hydroelectric power station's soil dam, whose total capacity is 15.6 cubic kilometers of water, is one of the highest dams in Europe that was constructed through sprinkling. The reservoir is located 3 km north-west of the district. The length of the reservoir is 70 km, width from 3 to 18 km, deepest point is about 75 meters, and the total area 605 km^{2}.

Apart from the River Kur, the reservoir feeds two channels of the 172 km-long Upper Qarabag Channel and the 123 km-long Upper Sirvan Channel. These channels are used to irrigate 10,000 square kilometres of area in the steppes of Mil, Mugan, and Sirvan. The Varvara reservoir and the Varvara hydroelectric power station are in 20 km east of the Mingachevir reservoir on the River Kur. The volume of the Varvara hydroelectric power station's energy blocks is 16 MW.

=== Geothermal Power Station ===
In June 2025, Mingachevir further strengthened its role as a national energy centre with the commissioning of the 8 November Power Station, the largest thermal power plant constructed in Azerbaijan since independence. The plant, built on the site of the historic Azerbaijan Thermal Power Plant, was initiated by presidential decree in October 2022 and constructed from February 2023 with local firms and international partners, including Italian and Chinese equipment suppliers. With a total installed capacity of 1,880 MW, it significantly boosts the city’s electricity generation, helps meet rising domestic demand, and enhances energy security while reducing natural gas consumption. The development reflects Mingachevir’s cultural and economic importance as an energy hub in the South Caucasus, a role first established in the Soviet era.

== Demographics ==
Population of Mingechevir by the year (at the beginning of the year)
Years	thsd. persons
2010	96.9
2011	97.8
2012	98.8
2013	99.7
2014	100.6
2015	101.6
2016	102.4
2017	103.2
2018	104.5

=== Ethnic groups ===
According to the 2009 census, the total population of the city is 96,304, including 95,700 Azerbaijanis, 413 Russians, 52 Lezgins and others.

Mingechevir	96304	100,0	46492	100,0	49812	100,0
including						
Azerbaijanis	95700	99,37	46355	99,7	49345	99,1
Russians	413	0,43	87	0,2	326	0,7
Lezgins	52	0,05	23	0,0	29	0,1
Tatars	38	0,04	5	0,0	33	0,1
Ukrainians	20	0,02	0	0,0	20	0,0
Turks	16	0,02	8	0,0	8	0,0
Kurds	7	0,01	3	0,0	4	0,0
Avars	6	0,01	0	0,0	6	0,0
Georgians	6	0,01	2	0,0	4	0,0
Others	46	0,05	9	0,0	37	0,1

== Climate ==
Mingachevir has a cold semi-arid climate (Köppen climate classification: BSk) with fairly evenly distributed precipitation.

Climate data for Yevlakh Airport (1991–2020 normals)
Month	Jan	Feb	Mar	Apr	May	Jun	Jul	Aug	Sep	Oct	Nov	Dec	Year
Mean daily maximum °C (°F)	8.8 (47.8)	10.5 (50.9)	14.5 (58.1)	22.3 (72.1)	27.0 (80.6)	32.0 (89.6)	34.6 (94.3)	34.2 (93.6)	28.6 (83.5)	22.6 (72.7)	14.5 (58.1)	10.0 (50.0)	21.6 (70.9)
Daily mean °C (°F)	4.5 (40.1)	5.5 (41.9)	8.8 (47.8)	15.9 (60.6)	20.7 (69.3)	25.5 (77.9)	28.1 (82.6)	27.9 (82.2)	22.7 (72.9)	17.0 (62.6)	9.9 (49.8)	5.9 (42.6)	16.0 (60.9)
Mean daily minimum °C (°F)	0.1 (32.2)	0.4 (32.7)	3.6 (38.5)	9.4 (48.9)	14.3 (57.7)	18.9 (66.0)	21.6 (70.9)	21.6 (70.9)	16.8 (62.2)	11.3 (52.3)	5.3 (41.5)	1.7 (35.1)	10.4 (50.7)
Average precipitation mm (inches)	16 (0.6)	20 (0.8)	22 (0.9)	34 (1.3)	47 (1.9)	45 (1.8)	22 (0.9)	22 (0.9)	17 (0.7)	49 (1.9)	25 (1.0)	20 (0.8)	339 (13.3)
Average precipitation days	4	5	6	6	7	5	3	2	3	5	4	4	54
Mean monthly sunshine hours	104.5	97.7	130.4	189.6	222.3	262.2	280.1	261.1	217.9	162.3	112.4	104.5	2,145
Source 1: NOAA (precipitation and sun 1971–1990)
Source 2: Meteostat

Climate data for Mingachevir (1956–1991 normals)
Month	Jan	Feb	Mar	Apr	May	Jun	Jul	Aug	Sep	Oct	Nov	Dec	Year
Average precipitation mm (inches)	20 (0.8)	25 (1.0)	32.5 (1.28)	34.3 (1.35)	42 (1.7)	40 (1.6)	21.4 (0.84)	19 (0.7)	25.1 (0.99)	40 (1.6)	27.2 (1.07)	18 (0.7)	344.5 (13.63)
Average precipitation days (≥ 0.01 in)	6.3	6.9	8.1	7.6	8.4	7	4.3	3.8	4.4	6	5.5	5.4	73.7
Source: NOAA

== Culture ==
The Davudova Mingacevir State Theatre was established on the basis of folk theatre in 1969. Every clubhouse has its own ensemble. There are also singing and music circles, as well as training courses on computers, tailoring, board games, and arts in the clubhouses. There are 8 clubhouses, including the Martyr Azar Niftaliyev clubhouse, Samad Vurgun clubhouse, Nariman Narimanov clubhouse, and others, in the town.

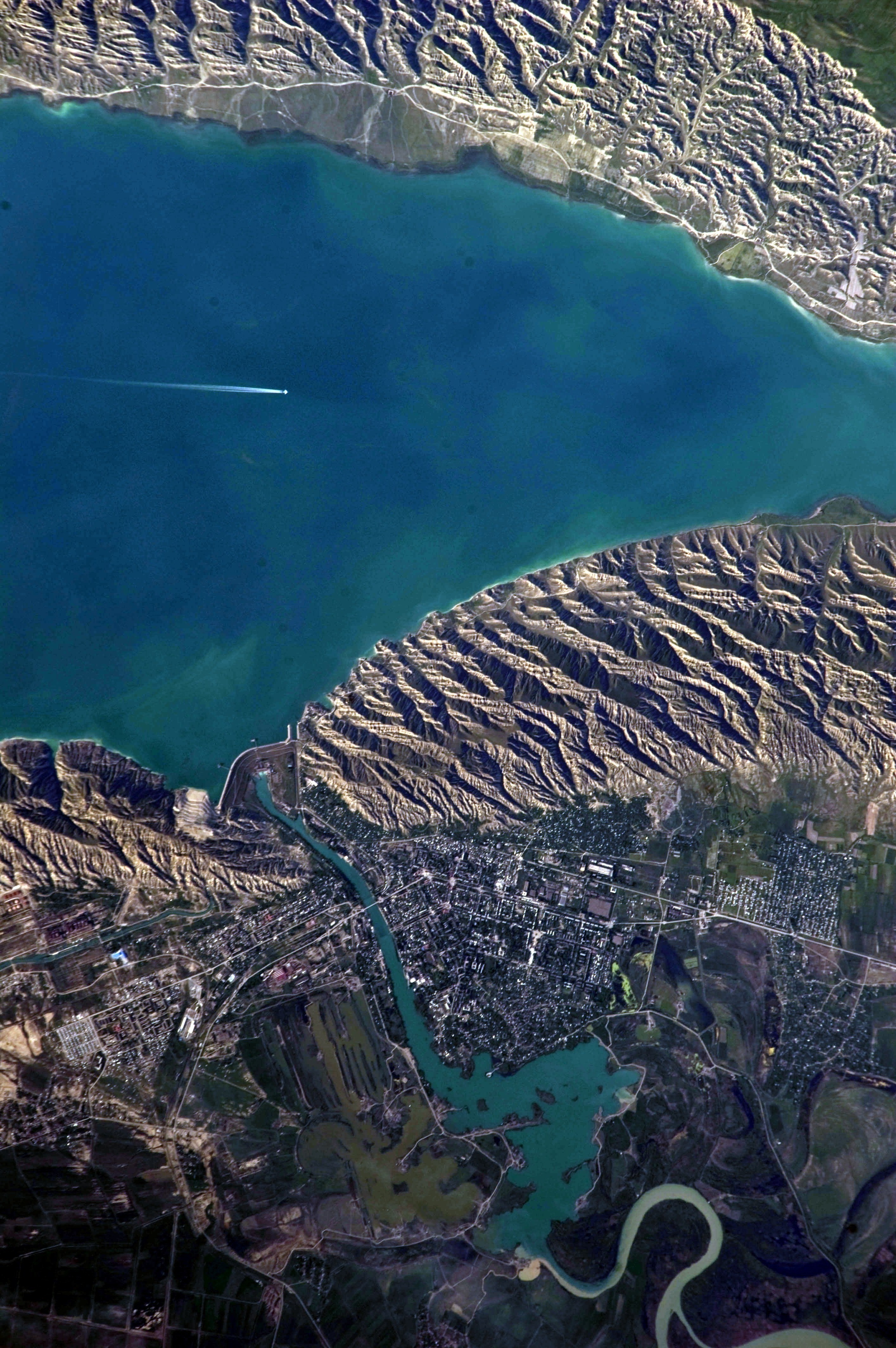
View of Mingachevir reservoir from a satellite.

=== Museums ===
The Mingacevir Historical Museum was established in January 1968. The museum has two branches—Martyrs' Memorial and Independence Museum. The museum has 14,461 exhibits. The city is also home to Mingachevir Gallery, which includes 310 works of art by Azerbaijani and Russian artists, including works by Mikhail Vrubel and Ilya Repin.

=== Music and media ===
There are 3 musical schools—Hacibayov School, Bulbul School, and Martyr Qasimov School—functioning in the city. The study in these schools lasts 7 years. A total of 1,500 students attend these schools, and 350 professional teachers train them. The schools have different courses on national musical instruments such as tar, kamancha, nagara, saz, and others, like piano, violin, and vocal.

The regional channel Mingachevir TV is headquartered in the city.

=== Parks ===
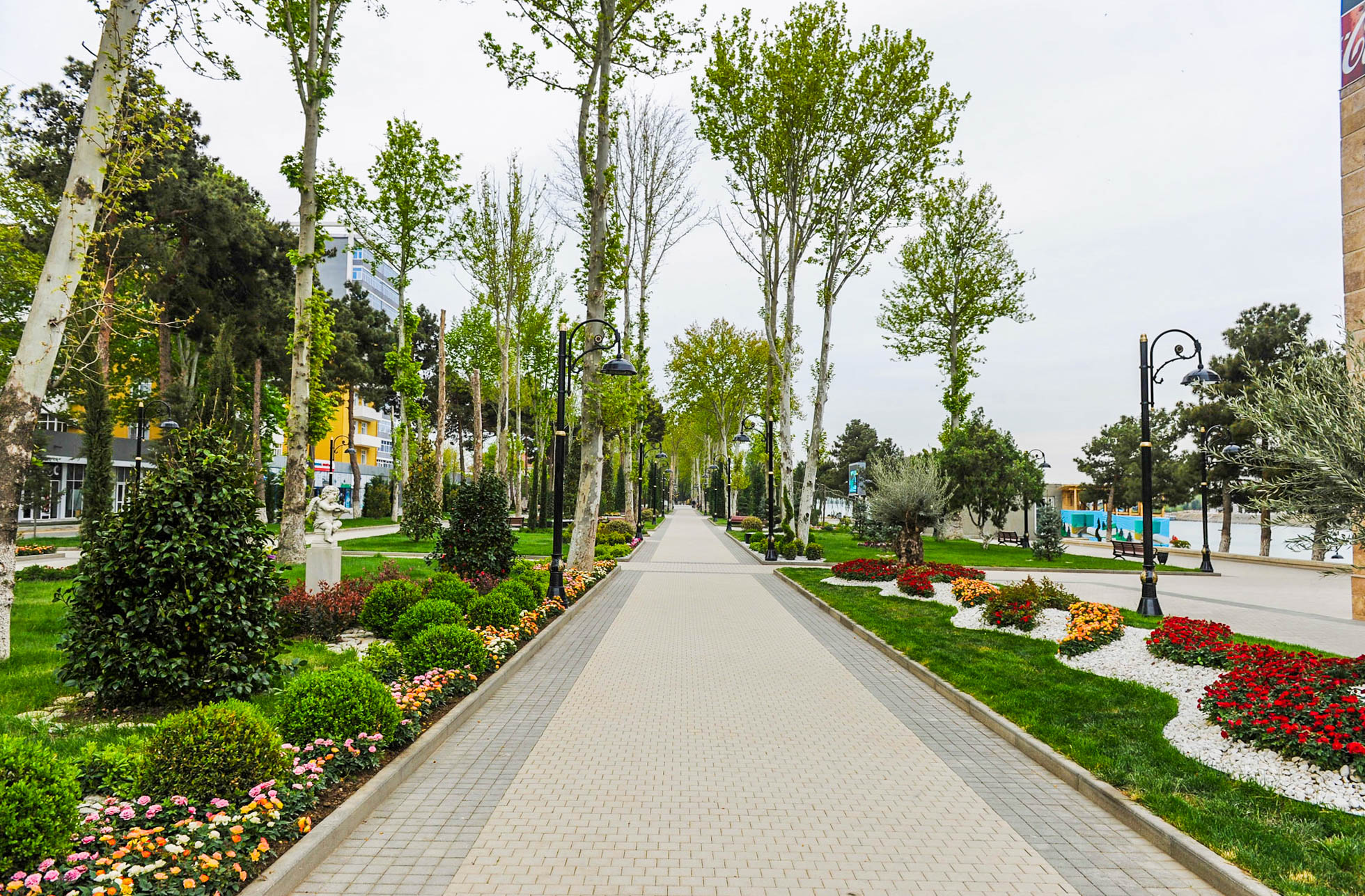
Seaside Park

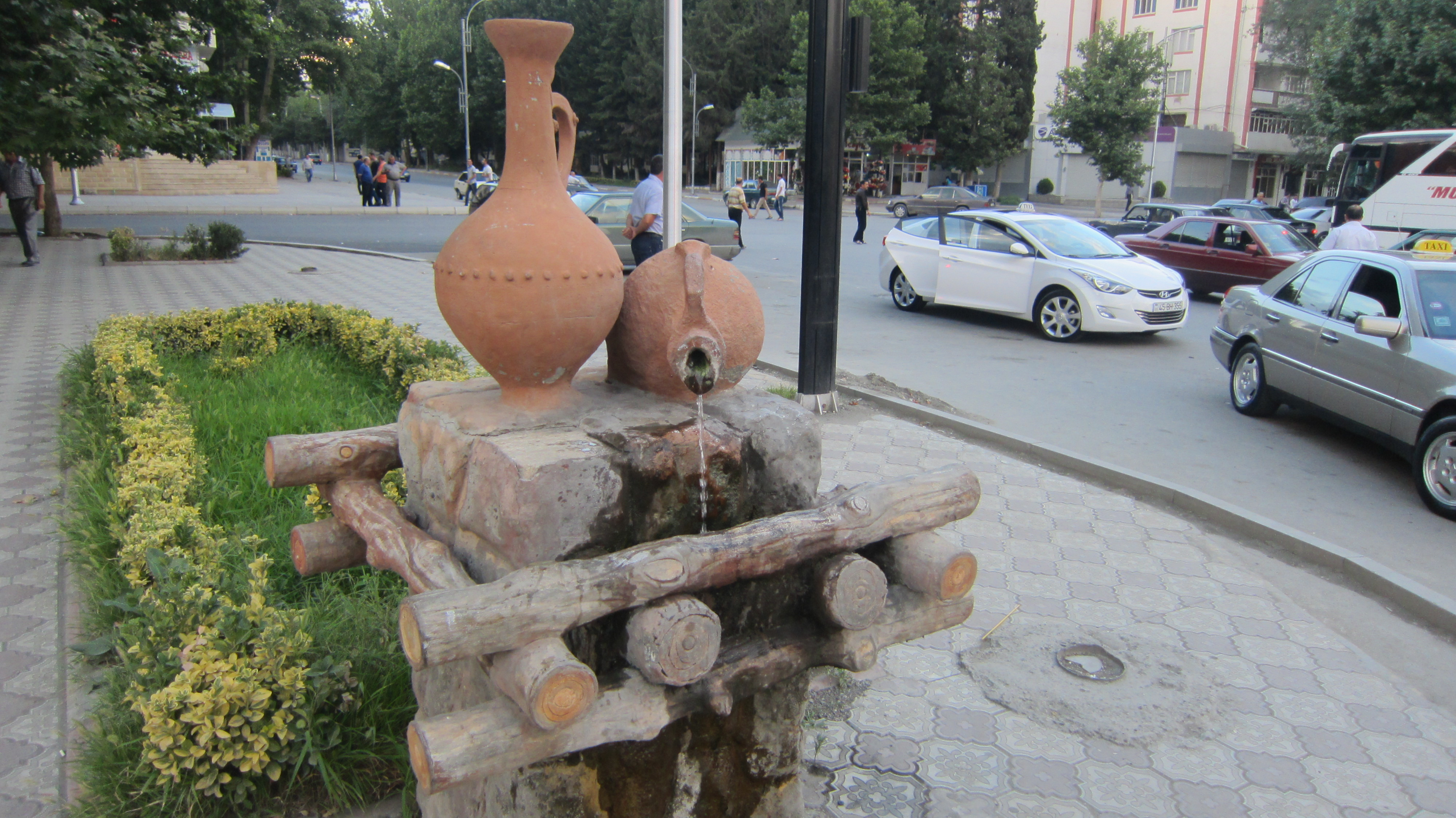
Mingachevir spring

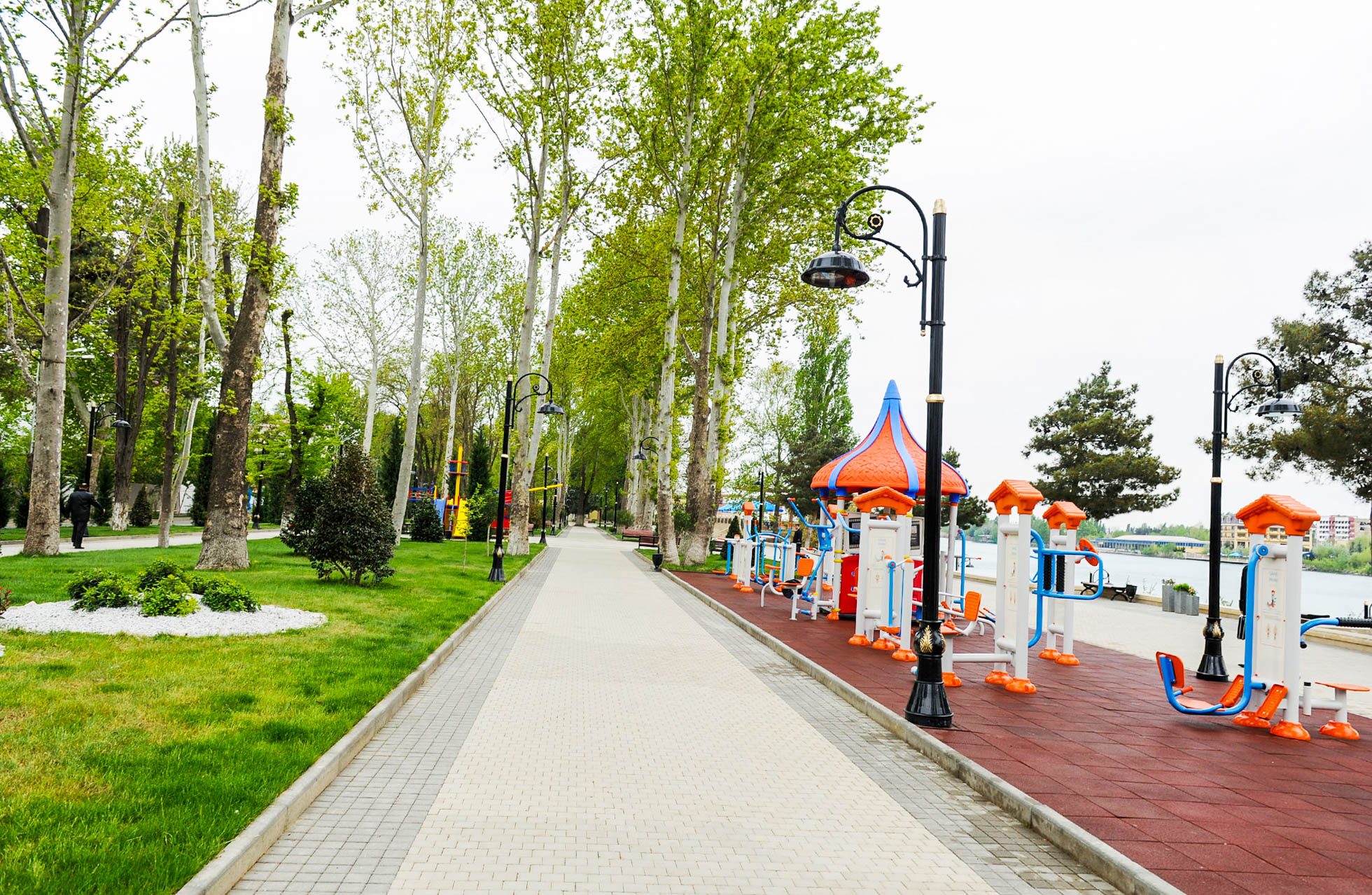
Seaside Park

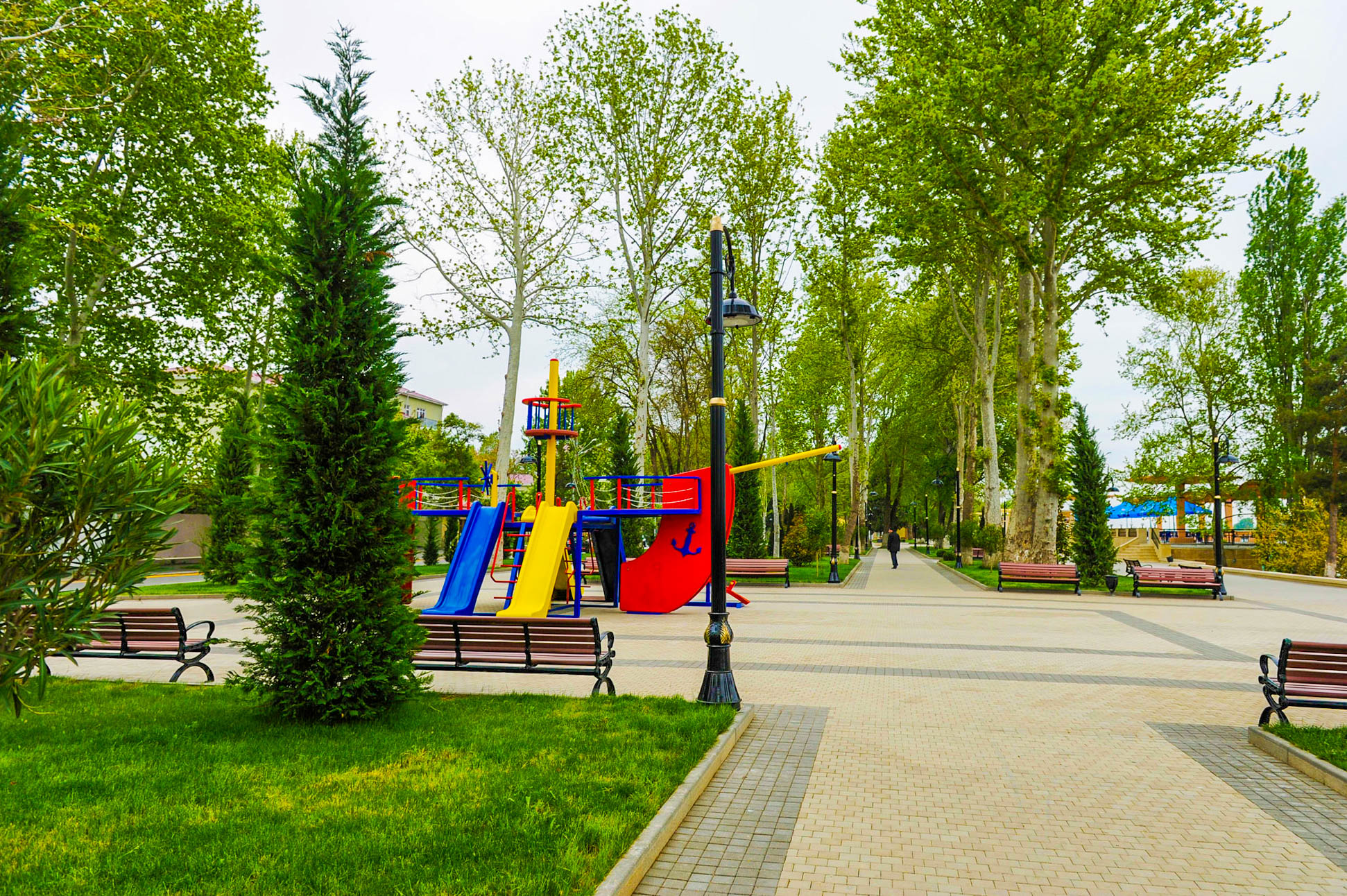
Seaside Boulevard

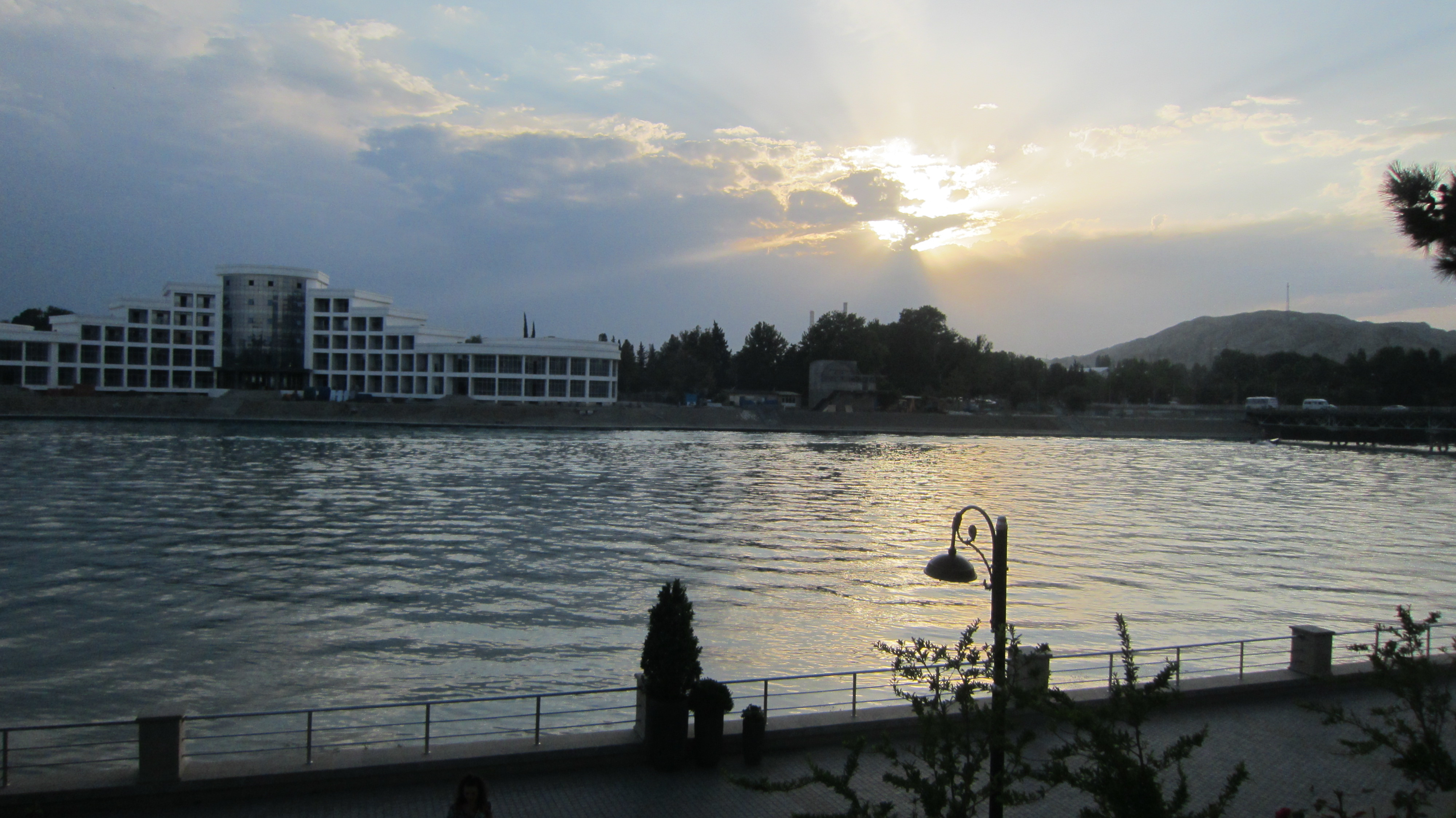
Mingachevir city sunset

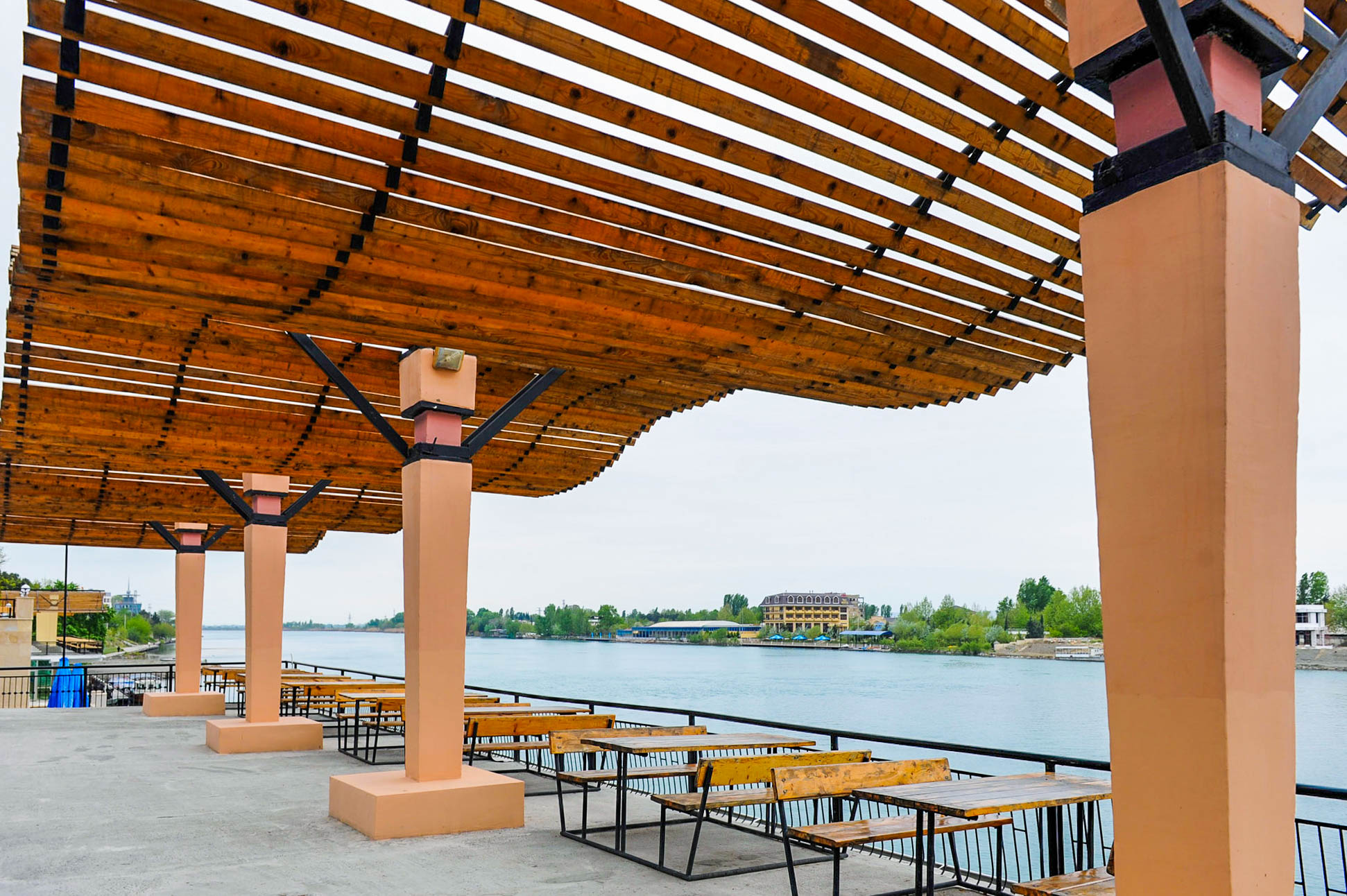
Seaside Boulevard

The city has many parks, including Sahil Park and Friendship Park.

=== Sports ===
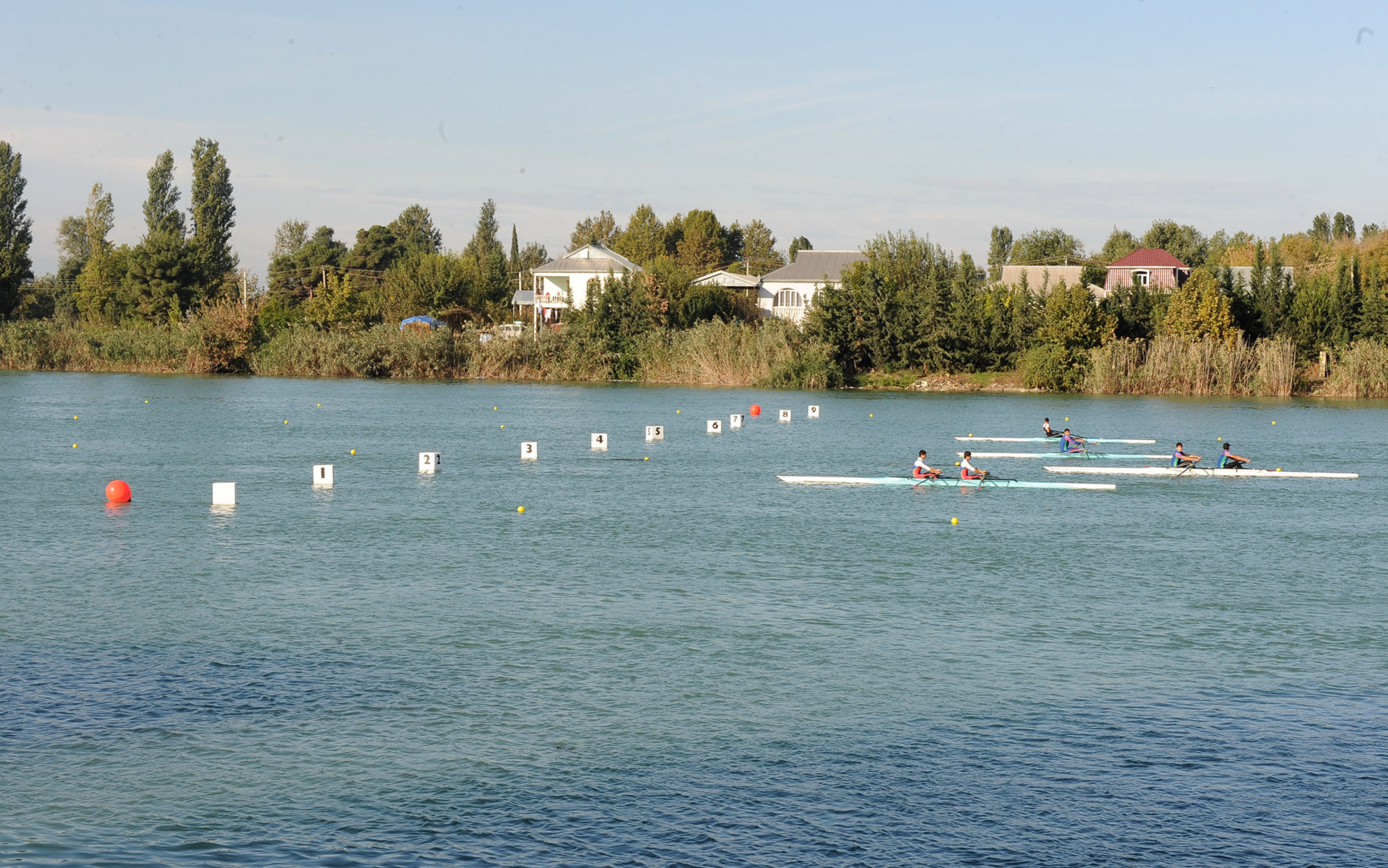
Kura Olympic training center in Mingachevir

The city has one professional football team, Energetik, competing in the top-flight of Azerbaijani football: the Azerbaijan First Division.

The city also contains the high-modern rowing Kur Sport and Rowing Centre, which was renovated and unveiled in 2010. The venue is expected to host canoe sprint at 2015 European Games.

== Transportation ==
September 28, 2025 – The first interregional train is launched between Agstafa and Mingachevir.

=== Public system ===
At its height, Mingachevir's trolleybus system consisted of three lines and existed until 2005.

== Education ==
Mingachevir State University, founded in 1991, is the oldest Azerbaijani educational institution in the city. Although originally part of Azerbaijan State Oil Academy, the institute became independent in 1991. Mingachevir Medical School, founded in 1991, includes 17 study halls for anatomy, therapy, surgery and pediatrics. The city also includes the local branch of the Azerbaijani Teachers Training Institute.

== Notable natives ==
Notable residents include politician Aydin Mirzazade.

== Twin towns—sister cities ==
Mingachevir is twinned with:

- Gölbaşı, Turkey (2007)
- Polotsk, Belarus (2012)
- Kars, Turkey (2013)
- Afula, Israel (2015)
- Kahramanmaraş, Turkey (2017)
- Orhangazi, Turkey

== See also ==
- Shaki
- Lankaran
- Nakchivan
- Sumgait
