= Mount Bozdağ =

Mountain in Azerbaijan

- Location within Caucasus Mountains

Highest point
- Elevation: 524.4 m (1,720 ft)
- Coordinates: 40°50′00″N 46°45′00″E

Geography
- Location: Azerbaijan
- Parent range: Greater Caucasus

The Mount Bozdağ (Azerbaijani: Bozdağ dağı) is a mountain in the Caucasus Mountains near Mingechevir, the fourth most populous city of Azerbaijan. Near the mount, where the Kura River flows, Mingachevir reservoir was built in 1953.

== See also ==
- Ganja, Azerbaijan
- Mingachevir reservoir
