= Aydin Mirzazade =

Azerbaijani politician (born 1957)

Aydin Mirzazade Aydın Mirzəzadə
- Incumbent
- Assumed office 2005

Personal details
- Born: 2 July 1957 (age 69) Mingachevir, Azerbaijan SSR, Soviet Union
- Party: New Azerbaijan Party

Aydin Mirzazade (Azerbaijani: Mirzəzade Aydın Böyükkişi oğlu, born 2 July 1957) is an Azerbaijani civil engineer and politician. He serves in the National Assembly.

== Early life ==
Aydin Mirzezade was born on July 2, 1957, in the city of Mingachevir. He finished high school No 10 in 1974. In 1975, he entered the Azerbaijan Civil Engineering Institute, Construction faculty, Division of Industrial and Civil Construction. He graduated from the Institute in 1980 and became a civil engineer.

In 1980, he worked as construction master of the mobile mechanized division of No 1315 located in Rjev town of Tver Oblast of the USSR. (Russia)

He served in the Azerbaijani Armed Forces during 1980-82.

From 1982 to 1993, he worked in different positions in the construction of Azerbaijan's QRES in Mingechevir.

In 1992 he graduated with honours from the Academy of Public Administration.

== Career ==
In 1993 he served as assistant and Deputy Head of Mingechevir Town Executive Government.

Between 1997 and 2000, he was Sector Manager of the social and political department of the Presidential Administration of Azerbaijan.

He took part in the establishment of the New Azerbaijan Party's Minghachevir branch and led it from 1992 to 1999.

He was elected to the Political Council of the New Azerbaijan Party at the I (1999), II (2001) and III (2005) Congresses.

He was reelected to Milli Mejlis from Mingechevir Constituency No 47 and serves as Deputy Chairman of the Security and Defense Committee of the Parliament.

In 2001, he defended a thesis for obtaining the degree of Candidate on "Peculiarities of forming of the multiparty system in the Republic of Azerbaijan".

He was named "Deputy of the year" in a survey conducted among parliamentary journalists during 2002-2009.

He was a representative of the presidential candidate Heydar Aliyev in 2003 and Representative of the presidential candidate Ilham Aliyev in the pre-electoral period in 2008.

== Personal life ==
He is an expert of the Azerbaijan National Encyclopedia and author of ten books.

He speaks two foreign languages: Russian and English.

He is married, with two children.

== Books ==
1. Azərbaycan Respublikasında çoxpartiyalı sistemin formalaşması xüsusiyyətləri. Bakı, 2001-ci il ( Peculiarities of forming of the multiparty system in the Republic of Azerbaijan. Baku, 2001)
2. Yeni Azərbaycan Partiyasi: yaranması, formalaşması və əsas fəaliyyət istiqamətləri. Bakı, 2002-ci il ( New Azerbaijan Party : Creation, formation and primary activity directions, Baku, 2002)
3. Demokratiya plyus. Bakı, 2004-ci il (Democracy plus. Baku, 2004)
4. Azərbaycan, Zaman, İnkişaf. Bakı, 2008-ci il. ( Azerbaijan, Time, Development. Baku, 2008)
5. Qarabağ düyünü, Bakı, "Azərbaycan", 2012.
6. "Müdriklik dərsləri. I hissə", Bakı, "Azərbaycan", 2014.
7. Karabag dügümü (Turk.)
8. Ermənistan-Azərbaycan, Dağlıq Qarabağ münaqişəsi: tarixi, mövcud durum və həlli yolları, Bakı, "Azərbaycan", 2015, səh 206.
9. Müdriklik dərsləri. II hissə , Bakı, "Azərbaycan", 2016.
10. Qarabağ düyünü (arm.), Sankt-Peterburq, 2016.
11. Heydər Əliyev siyasi irsinin politoloji aspektləri, Bakı, 2016.
12. Ermənistanın Azərbaycana hərbi təcavüzünün yaşyarımlıq Zəhra Quliyeva faciəsi, Bakı, 2017.
13. Müdriklik dərsləri. III hissə, Bakı, 2018.

== Photogallery ==
Former speaker of the Azerbaijani parliament Murtuz Aleskerov and Aydin Mirzazade

== See also ==
- 2005 Azerbaijani parliamentary election
- National Assembly of Azerbaijan
- New Azerbaijan Party
