= Zakatal okrug =

Former county in Caucasus, Russian Empire

Coordinates: 41°38′01″N 46°38′36″E

Zakatal okrug Закатальский округ
- Okrug
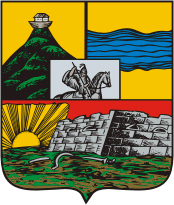
- Coat of arms

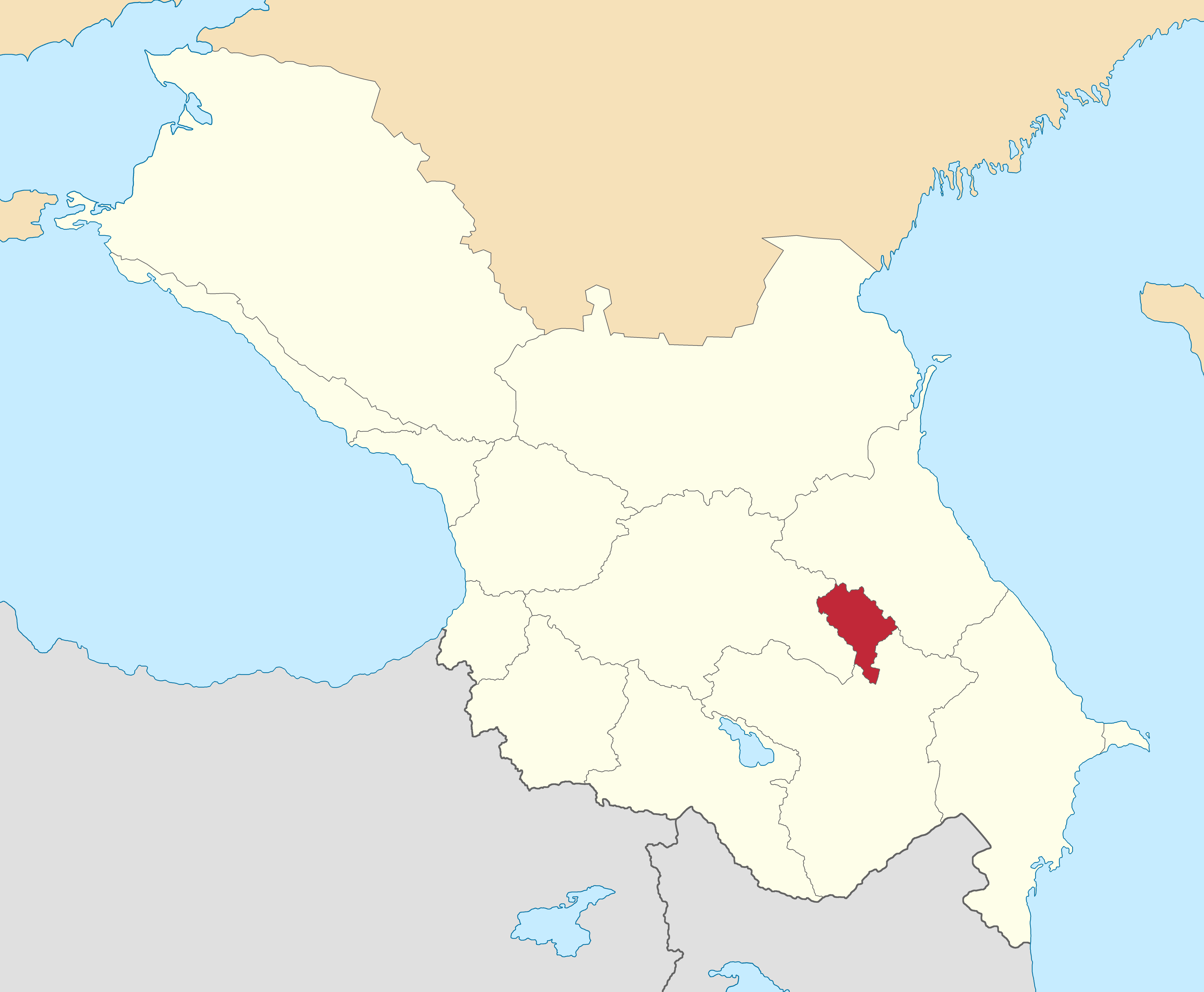
- Location in the Caucasus Viceroyalty
- Country: Russian Empire
- Viceroyalty: Caucasus
- Established: 1859
- Abolished: 1918
- Capital: Zakataly (present-day Zaqatala)

Area
  - Total: 3,985.77 km^{2} (1,538.91 sq mi)

Population (1916)
  - Total: 92,608
  - Density: 23.235/km^{2} (60.177/sq mi)
  - Urban: 4.86%
  - Rural: 95.14%

The Zakatal okrug (Note: Russian: Закатальский округ, pre-reform orthography: Закатальскій округъ, romanized: Zakatalskiy okrug [zəkɐˈtalʲskʲɪj ˈokrʊk]; Azerbaijani: زاقاتالا دائره‌سی, romanized: Zaqatala dairəsi) was a special administrative district (okrug) of the Caucasus Viceroyalty of the Russian Empire, part of the Tiflis Governorate from 1893 to 1905. The administrative centre of the district was Zakataly (present-day Zaqatala), and it corresponded to most of the contemporary districts of Balakan, Zaqatala and Qax of Azerbaijan. The Zakatal okrug was established from the territories of the erstwhile Free Jamaats of Jar-Balakan, bordering the Tiflis Governorate to the west, the Elizavetpol Governorate to the south and the Dagestan Oblast to the north. The district was the smallest independent (not part of any province or region) administrative unit of the Russian Empire, similarly to the Sukhumi okrug.

== History ==
The district was originally established under the name Belokan in 1842, within the Georgia-Imeretia Governorate, two years after it was renamed to Jaro-Belokan. The autonomous status of the district was confirmed in 1846, leading to its renaming to Zakataly in 1860 and its placement into the temporary administration of Dagestan during which its administration was organised into a military council, of which the chief was the head of the district, concurrently with Dagestan. In 1881, an independent administration was introduced. The Zakatal okrug was incorporated into the 'civilian' administration of the Tiflis Governorate from 1893 until 1905 when was removed and placed directly under the Viceroy of the Caucasus.

The social structure of the Zakatal okrug was multi-layered in its patriarchal-clans which were involved in "mountain feudalism", which became muddled by growing ethno-nationalism and the social differences they bore. The Free Jamaats (Society) peoples were the collective owners of the lands in which the Ingiloys and Tatars (later Azerbaijanis) lived, for which the latter paid tax to them. In 1863, a rumor circulated that the administration of Zakataly was planning to emancipate the Georgians and Tatars from their financial obligations to the Free Jamaats peoples, leading to an anti-Russian uprising of its Dagestani inhabitants. The uprising became elevated by the declaration of jihad (holy war) until its suppression by local troops assisted by Tatar volunteers.

Following the Russian Revolution, most of the district was incorporated into the Azerbaijan Democratic Republic and transformed into the Zaqatala Governorate, despite also being claimed by the neighboring Democratic Republic of Georgia. On account of the dispute, the authorities of both states agreed to resolve the territorial dispute over Zakatal strictly by peaceful means. A few hundred Armenians remained in the district by 1919 and were harassed by outlaws.

Despite the Russian SFSR initially recognising the Zakatal okrug as part of Georgia in the Treaty of Moscow, a mixed commission consisting of Georgians and Azerbaijanis was formed to arbitrate the dispute following the region's sovietisation. During the administrative-territorial reforms of the 1920s, the Zakataly district was separated into the raions of Balakan, Zagatala, and Gakh.

== Economy ==
The main occupations of the predominantly Sunni population included cattle breeding, agriculture, viticulture, picking fruits (mainly walnuts), handicrafts and silkworm breeding.

== Administrative divisions ==
The prefectures (участки, uchastki) of the Zakatal okrug were:

Name	Administrative centre	1912 population	Area
Aliabadskiy prefecture (Алиабадский участок)	Aliabad	14,254	430.45 square versts (489.88 km^{2}; 189.14 mi^{2})
Dzharo-Mukhakhskiy prefecture (Джаро-Мухахский участок)	Zakataly (Zaqatala)	38,879	1,737.01 square versts (1,976.83 km^{2}; 763.26 mi^{2})
Kakhskiy prefecture (Кахский участок)	Kakh (Qax)	17,595	1,334.78 square versts (1,519.06 km^{2}; 586.51 mi^{2})
Almalinskiy rayon (Алмалинский район)	Almalo (Almalı)	–	–
Belokanskiy rayon (Белоканский район)	Belokany (Balakən)	–	–
Mukhakhskiy rayon (Мухахский район)	Mukhakh (Muxax)	–	–

There once existed a Gornye magaly (lit. 'mountain quarters') district "along the headwaters of the Samur", however, it was dissolved in 1860. There was also a Belokanskiy prefecture (Белоканский участок) prior to 1912.

== Demographics ==
=== Russian Empire Census ===
According to the Russian Empire Census, the Zakatal okrug—then part of the Tiflis Governorate—had a population of 84,224 on 28 January [O.S. 15 January] 1897, including 45,418 men and 38,806 women. The plurality of the population indicated Avar-Andean to be their mother tongue, with significant Tatar, (Note: Before 1918, Azerbaijanis were generally known as "Tatars". This term, employed by the Russians, referred to Turkic-speaking Muslims of the South Caucasus. After 1918, with the establishment of the Azerbaijan Democratic Republic and "especially during the Soviet era", the Tatar group identified itself as "Azerbaijani".) Georgian, and Dargin speaking minorities.

Linguistic composition of the Zakatal okrug in 1897
Language	Native speakers	%
Avar-Andean	31,670	37.60
Tatar	28,950	34.37
Georgian	12,389	14.71
Dargin	7,441	8.83
Armenian	2,100	2.49
Kyurin	975	1.16
Russian	315	0.37
Ukrainian	118	0.14
Polish	115	0.14
Kazi-Kumukh	61	0.07
German	11	0.01
Jewish	11	0.01
Persian	7	0.01
Ossetian	6	0.01
Mingrelian	3	0.00
Turkish	3	0.00
Greek	2	0.00
Imeretian	2	0.00
Belarusian	1	0.00
Kist	1	0.00
Other	43	0.05
TOTAL	84,224	100.00

=== Kavkazskiy kalendar ===
According to the 1917 publication of Kavkazskiy kalendar, the Zakatal okrug had a population of 92,608 on 14 January [O.S. 1 January] 1916, including 48,323 men and 44,285 women, 86,128 of whom were the permanent population, and 6,480 were temporary residents:

Nationality	Urban		Rural		TOTAL	
Nationality	Number	%	Number	%	Number	%
Sunni Muslims (Note: Primarily Turco-Tatars.)	288	6.39	42,491	48.23	42,779	46.19
North Caucasians	1,068	23.71	40,712	46.21	41,780	45.11
Georgians	204	4.53	4,370	4.96	4,574	4.94
Armenians	2,165	48.06	365	0.41	2,530	2.73
Shia Muslims (Note: Primarily Tatars.)	486	10.79	91	0.10	577	0.62
Russians	270	5.99	56	0.06	326	0.35
Other Europeans	21	0.47	2	0.00	23	0.02
Asiatic Christians	0	0.00	16	0.02	16	0.02
Jews	3	0.07	0	0.00	3	0.00
TOTAL	4,505	100.00	88,103	100.00	92,608	100.00

== Bibliography ==
- Bournoutian, George A. (2018). Armenia and Imperial Decline: The Yerevan Province, 1900–1914. Milton Park, Abingdon, Oxon: Routledge. ISBN 978-1-351-06260-2. OCLC 1037283914.
- Hovannisian, Richard G. (1971). The Republic of Armenia. Vol. 1: The First Year, 1918–1919. Berkeley: University of California Press. ISBN 978-0520019843.
- Hovannisian, Richard G. (1982). The Republic of Armenia. Vol. 2: From Versailles to London, 1919–1920. Berkeley: University of California Press. ISBN 978-0520041868.
- Hovannisian, Richard G. (1996a). The Republic of Armenia. Vol. 3: From London to Sèvres, February–August 1920. Berkeley: University of California Press. ISBN 978-0520088030.
- Janeliże, Otʻar (2018). The Democratic Republic of Georgia, 1918-1921. Tbilisi. ISBN 978-9941-8-0096-2. OCLC 1110424382.
- Javakhishvili, Ivane (2011). Caucasiologic Papers (PDF). Tbilisi: Tbilisi State University. Archived (PDF) from the original on 16 April 2022.
- Kacharava, Andro; Daushvili, Aleko (1 January 2012). The Democratic Republic of Georgia: Struggle for Independence 1918-1921.
- Кавказский календарь на 1910 год [Caucasian calendar for 1910] (in Russian) (65th ed.). Tiflis: Tipografiya kantselyarii Ye.I.V. na Kavkaze, kazenny dom. 1910. Archived from the original on 15 March 2022.
- Кавказский календарь на 1913 год [Caucasian calendar for 1913] (in Russian) (68th ed.). Tiflis: Tipografiya kantselyarii Ye.I.V. na Kavkaze, kazenny dom. 1913. Archived from the original on 19 April 2022.
- Кавказский календарь на 1917 год [Caucasian calendar for 1917] (in Russian) (72nd ed.). Tiflis: Tipografiya kantselyarii Ye.I.V. na Kavkaze, kazenny dom. 1917. Archived from the original on 4 November 2021.
- Kazemzadeh, Firuz (1951). The Struggle for Transcaucasia (1917–1921). New York City: Philosophical Library. OCLC 1943521.
- Tsutsiev, Arthur (2014). Atlas of the Ethno-Political History of the Caucasus (PDF). Translated by Nora Seligman Favorov. New Haven: Yale University Press. ISBN 9780300153088. Archived (PDF) from the original on 17 June 2023.
- Wright, John F. R.; Goldenberg, Suzanne; Schofield, Richard N. (1996). Transcaucasian boundaries. London: UCL Press. ISBN 0-203-21447-1. OCLC 252906502.
- Yilmaz, Harun (1 June 2009). "An Unexpected Peace: Azerbaijani–Georgian Relations, 1918–20". Revolutionary Russia. 22 (1): 37–67. doi:10.1080/09546540902900288. ISSN 0954-6545. S2CID 143471218.
