= Lahıc =

Lahıc may refer to:

- Lahıc, Goygol, Azerbaijan
- Lahıc, Ismailli, Azerbaijan
- Lahıc, Zaqatala, Azerbaijan
