= Aslan bey Gardashov =

Azerbaijani politician (1866–1920)

Aslan bey Gardashov Aslan bəy Qardaşov
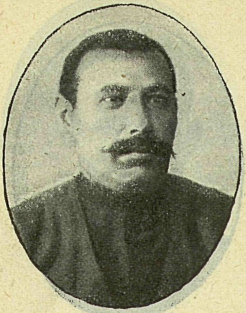

Minister of Agriculture of Azerbaijan Democratic Republic (ADR)
- In office April 14, 1919 – December 22, 1919
- President: Nasib Yusifbeyli Prime Minister, (Chairman of Azerbaijani Parliament)
- Preceded by: Khosrov bey Sultanov
- Succeeded by: Ahmed bey Pepinov

Personal details
- Born: 1866 Çökəkoba, Zaqatala Rayon, Azerbaijan
- Died: 1920 (aged 53–54) Baku, Azerbaijan

Aslan bey Gardashov Aliagha oglu (Azerbaijani: Aslan bəy Qardaşov Əliağa oğlu; 1866–1920) was an Azerbaijani statesman who served as Minister of Agriculture in the fourth cabinet of Azerbaijan Democratic Republic, and was member of Parliament of Azerbaijan.

== Early years ==
Gardashov was born in Çökəkoba village of Zaqatala Rayon, Azerbaijan, Russian Empire. He studied in Zaqatala uyezd school and graduated from Pedagogical Seminary. Before the February Revolution, he attended the Istanbul University Faculty of Law and was a member of the Transcaucasian Sejm. After the revolution he joined the ranks of Musavat.

== Political career ==
Gardashov was a member of the Azerbaijani National Council on the eve of declaration of independence who voted in favor of establishing an independent republic. After establishment of Azerbaijan Democratic Republic on May 28, 1918, Gardashov was elected to the National Assembly of Azerbaijan from Ahrar Party. When the fourth government under Nasib Yusifbeyli was formed on April 14, 1919, he was appointed Minister of Agriculture of ADR.

After Bolshevik take over of Azerbaijan on April 28, 1920, Gardashov was one of the members of Azerbaijani parliament who voted in favor of giving up the power to Bolsheviks. He was subsequently arrested and executed by Bolsheviks.

== See also ==
- Azerbaijani National Council
- Cabinets of Azerbaijan Democratic Republic (1918–1920)
- Current Cabinet of Azerbaijan Republic
