= Tala, Azerbaijan =

Tala, Azerbaijan may refer to:

- Aşağı Tala, Azerbaijan
- Yuxarı Tala, Azerbaijan
