= Chardakhly =

Chardakhly may refer to:

- Çardaqlı (disambiguation), places in Azerbaijan
- Çardaqlar (disambiguation), places in Azerbaijan
