= National Center of Azerbaijan =

The National Center of Azerbaijan (Azerbaijani: Azərbaycan Milli Mərkəzi) is a secret organization that operated from 1924 to 1931 in the Azerbaijan Soviet Socialist Republic(AzSSR).

== History ==
According to the investigative work carried out by the State Political Department of the Azerbaijan SSR under the name "The Case of the National Center of Azerbaijan", this center was established in Baku in 1924 to overthrow the Soviet government and creating the independent Republic of Azerbaijan. The center was headed by representatives of the intelligentsia, including former ministers and members of the government of the Azerbaijan Democratic Republic, representatives of the Musavat and Ittihad parties.

In order to jointly fight against the Soviet government, the "United Transcaucasian Committee" was created at the beginning of 1928, which united the Musavat and Ittihad parties under its leadership. Cooperation was also established with an anti-Soviet organization in Dagestan, and with the local peasant party. In its activities, the center was guided by the political charters of the "Joint Committee of Caucasian Political Emigrants", headed by Alimardan bek Topchubashev in Paris, and the Istanbul Bureau of "Musavat", headed by Mahammad Amin Rasulzade.

There were committees on the industry, agriculture, transport, and a military group functioning under the leadership of the center. Financial assistance to the center was provided by political immigrants in Istanbul and Paris.

Links of the National Center with foreign emigration centers were established in 1926 after the return of the former emigrant Yagub Vezirov from Istanbul. Along with the foreign emigration centers, communication was maintained with their offices in Ardabil and Tabriz. According to the investigation materials, these departments served as a transfer point for the delivery of tasks from Paris and Istanbul. Among the members of the Ardabil group were such political emigrants as Gafar Gafarov and Jafar Jafarov, the Tabriz group - Teymur bey Melik-Aslanov, Kalbali Khan of Nakhchivan.

On September 30, 1931, at a court session of the Board of the State Political Administration of the Azerbaijan SSR, and on February 2, 1932, in Tiflis, at the court of the Board of the Transcaucasian GPU, the "Case of the National Center of Azerbaijan" was considered, the activities of which were terminated, and its members were sentenced to various terms of imprisonment.

== Goals and objectives ==
One of the center's main tasks was to create an economic base for the future independent republic. At the first stage, it was planned to allocate national capital in all sectors of industry and agriculture; create an independent national energy base; complete Baku-Julfa railway construction and build the Nukha-Zagatala, Shusha-Karyagin, Shusha-Qubadli highways.

In addition, the members of the organization sought to achieve a national revival among the Azerbaijani youth and intelligentsia.

== Members ==
The organization consisted of 53 members.

The leadership of the National Center included Mammad Hasan Hajinsky, Khudadat bey Melik-Aslanov, Firuz bey Ordubadsky, Ahmad bey Pepinov, Rza Shabanov, Chingiz Yildirim, Muhammad Khalilov, Muhammad Mulaev, Zeynal Tagiyev, Alesker Bey Baylarbekov and Mirza Latif Mirzoev.

== See also ==
- Azerbaijan Soviet Socialist Republic
- History of Azerbaijan
