= Kəpənəkçi =

Kəpənəkçi or Kepenekchi or Kyapyanyakchi or Kapanakchi or Kapanachkhi may refer to:

- Kəpənəkçi, Goranboy, Azerbaijan
- Kəpənəkçi, Zaqatala, Azerbaijan
