= Jar-Balakan =

Historical self-governing communities in the Caucasus

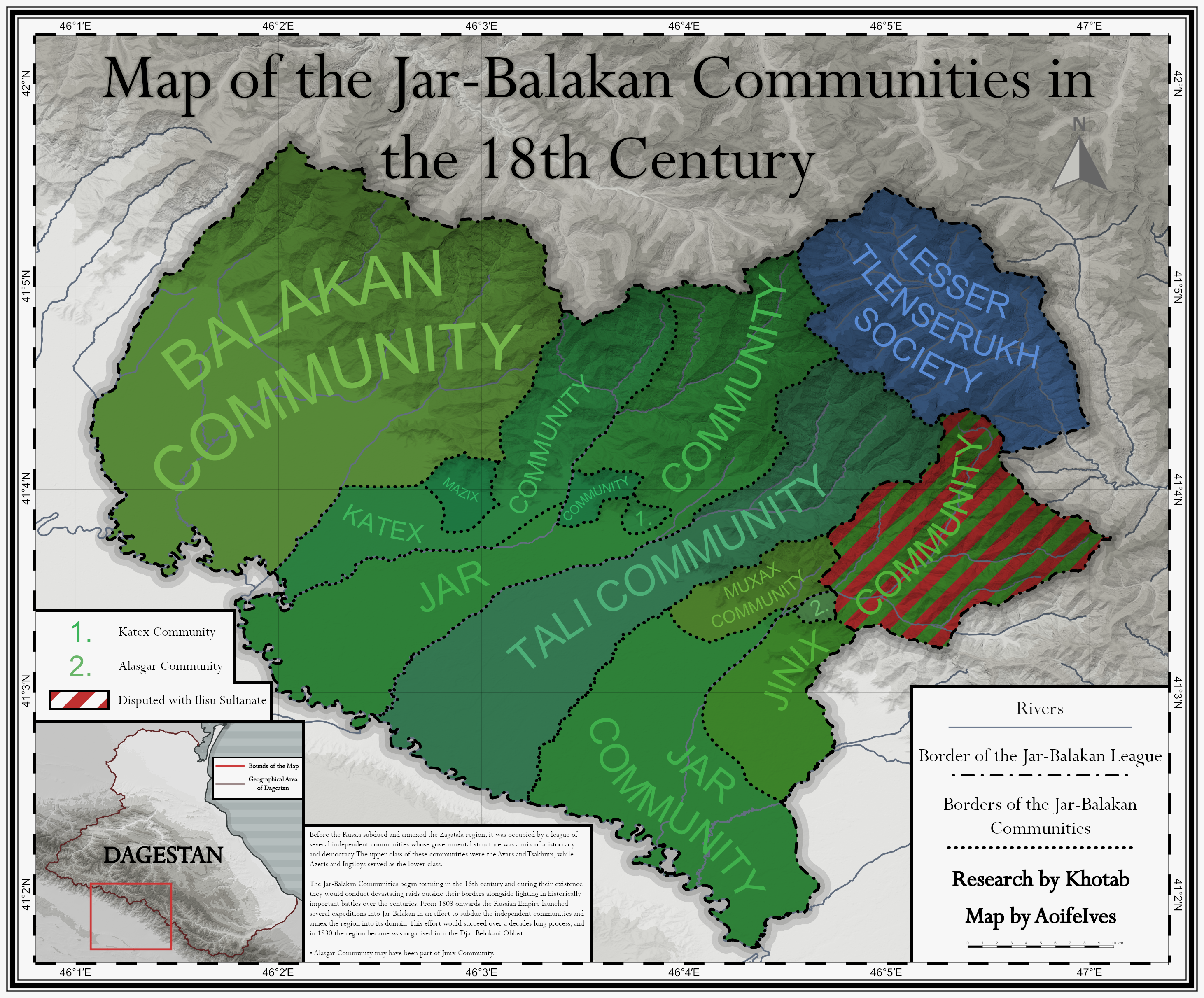
Map of Jar-Balakan Communities in the 18th Century

The Djaro-Belokani communities (also Char, Car, Jar, Djari, Chary, rarely Chartalah) were a group of self-governing communities in the Caucasus from the 17th to the 19th centuries. They had close ties with the Elisu Sultanate to the southeast.

== Geography, peoples and government ==
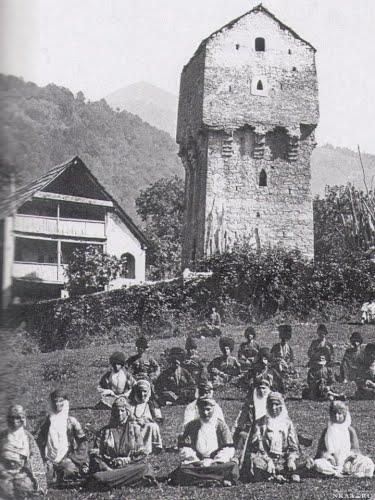
Chingizgala

The entity extended for about 60 kilometres along the south slope of the Caucasus Mountains in what is now Azerbaijan. Here a series of valleys extended down from the mountain crest southwest to the lowlands of the Alazan River. The population was centered in the lower valleys and their outwash plains. To the southeast was the Elisu Sultanate and beyond that the Shaki Khanate. To the west was the Georgian Kingdom of Kakheti and north over the mountains was Dagestan. The lowlands to the southwest were inhabited by Georgians in the west and Azerbaijanis in the east. Its location near the Christian-Muslim divide and proximity to Dagestani raiders made it a battleground.

The ruling class was a mixture of Avars and Tsakhurs. The common people were Azeris and Ingiloys (ie Georgian Muslims). The four peoples tended to live in separate villages. The Tsakhurs came from north of the mountains (see Elisu Sultanate) and "Avar" may have originally been a vague term for Dagestani. Tsutsiev gives the predominant population as Avar and shows a migration south from the uppermost Avar Koysu River. Early Russian documents tended to call the ruling class "Lezgians".

The political system has been described as an "aristo-democratic republic". It was a league of five communities with theoretically equal power. In terms of real power they ranked: Djari, Belokan, Tali, Mukhakh and Dzhinikh. Some add Katekh as a sixth. Djari had by far the most wealth and power. Decisions were made by one or more Jamaats or assemblies. The Jamaat elected a Qadi who had judicial and executive powers. Early writers emphasized the rightlessness of the common people. Recent writers reverse this. The Tsakhurs and Avars confined themselves to collecting a land tax and villages were led by "Agsakkals" (meaning 'White-beards' ie elders) who administered Sharia law.

Belokan is today a regionally important town as is Zaqatala 25 km southeast. From old maps (Baddeley, page 250) Tali is shown just south of the centre of modern Zaqatala, consistent with the site of the present sub-village of Yuxari Tala home to the 1910 Tala mosque. Mukhakh (now spelled Muxax) is shown south of that while Djari is almost certainly the modern village of Car (pronounced Jar) at the head of the valley that runs 8 km southwest to Zaqatala. Dzhinikh may have been near the modern Lekit. Katekh (modern spelling Katex) is 8 km west of Zaqatala. In 1830 seven of the 64 legal villages were north of the mountain crest near the original home of the Tsakhurs. In the early 18th century a Turkish firman recognized Djaro-Belokani control as far southwest as the Iori River. The western boundary seems to have been near Lagodekhi across the modern Georgian border.

== History ==
This was near the area of Lekianoba where Dagestanis would cross the mountains to raid Georgia. Baddeley says that the Djaris were much involved and sold slaves at the Pashalik of Akhaltsikhe. Gammer thinks the economy was injured when the Russians defeated the Turks and blocked the slave trade. For the arrival of the Tsakhurs see Elisu Sultanate.

In 1562 Shah Tahmasp I granted lands west of the Shaki Khanate to a Tsakhur called Adi-Kurkul Beg. The Georgian kings of Kakheti claimed the area and lost a decisive battle in 1695. The Djaris won some battles and in 1715 submitted to Imam Gulu Khan who was Wali of Kakheti. The Djaris fought Nadir Shah's army in 1738 near Dzhinikh and killed his brother Ibraham-Khan.

Following the annexation of Georgia, several members of the royal family found protection with the mountaineers. It took seven campaigns for the Russians to subdue the area. On 9 March 1803, the Russians stormed Belokan and killed many civilians. On 29 March they entered the abandoned village of Djari. In 1804 General Gulyakov was killed on a punitive expedition in the area. There was another rebellion about 1806 and near this time the Djaris failed to take Fort Alexandrovsky on the Alazani. In 1830, after a 6-month rebellion, the inhabitants of Djari and other villages were resettled in the lowlands. Another attempted resettlement led to another rebellion in 1832. The Russian conquest in 1830 produced a strong backlash in Dagestan and contributed to the origin of the Murid War. In May and December of that year Dagestanis fought the Russians in the Alazani valley. General Strekalov was severely defeated at Zaqatali. Hamzad Bek seems to have been involved in this when he was arrested. Hamzad Bek campaigned here in 1832, Daniyal Bek in 1848 and Shamil in 1853. Shamil's 1853 defeat was largely due to Argutinsky's remarkable march across the snow-covered mountains from Akhty.

The community was gradually whittled away. Its legal extinction is given by some as 1806 and others as 1830. In 1830 72,900 acres of their land were taken for settlement by Ukrainian Cossacks. (It is not clear what happened to these people.) In 1832 they were forbidden to use grazing lands between the Alazani and Iori Rivers. There were attempts to Christianize the Ingiloys and to classify them as Georgians. In 1830 the area became the Djaro-Belokani Oblast. In 1840 it became the Belokan Uezd, then Belokan Okrug and then the Djaro-Belokani Military Okrug. In 1839 it was divided into 5 Magils each under a Naib. The Magil north of the mountains was soon transferred to the Derbent Military Okrug and after the Murid War to the Samur Okrug of the Dagestan Oblast.
