= Laqodexbinə =

Coordinates: 41.5737°N 46.5407°E

Laqodexbinə (Avar: Лагадухъ) is a village in the municipality of Yuxarı Tala in the Zaqatala Rayon of Azerbaijan.
