= Qəbizdərə =

- Location within Azerbaijan Location within Shaki-Zagatala Economic Region
- Coordinates: 41°41′46″N 46°35′13″E
- Country: Azerbaijan
- Rayon: Zaqatala
- Municipality: Mazıx
- Time zone: UTC+4 (AZT)
  - Summer (DST): UTC+5 (AZT)

Qəbizdərə (also, Kabizdara, Kabizdere, Kapiadara, and Kapizdara; Avar: КъибицIдира) is a village in the Zaqatala Rayon of Azerbaijan. The village forms part of the municipality of Mazıx.
