= Uzuntala, Azerbaijan =

Uzuntala, Azerbaijan may refer to:

- Uzuntala, Qakh
- Uzuntala, Zaqatala
