= Sabunçu =

Sabunçu or Sabunchu or Sabyncha or Sabynchy or Sabunchy may refer to:

- Sabunçu, Baku, Azerbaijan
- Sabunçu, Zaqatala, Azerbaijan
- Sabunçu raion, Azerbaijan
