= Ziliban =

Zilban
- Location within Azerbaijan Location within Shaki-Zagatala Economic Region
- Coordinates: 41°39′N 46°40′E
- Country: Azerbaijan
- Rayon: Zaqatala
- Municipality: Car
- Time zone: UTC+4 (AZT)
  - Summer (DST): UTC+5 (AZT)

Zilban (also, Tsilban and Silban) is a village in the Zaqatala Rayon of Azerbaijan. The village forms part of the municipality of Car.
