= Gaziyev =

Gaziyev (Azerbaijani: Qazıyev), also spelt Gaziev, is an Azerbaijani and Russian masculine surname, its feminine counterpart is Gaziyeva. It may refer to

- Arif Gaziyev (1937–2021), Azerbaijani visual artist
- Bahaddin Gaziyev (born 1965), Azerbaijani journalist
- Bakhromjon Gaziev (born 1979), Uzbek sports administrator
- Govhar Gaziyeva (1887–1960), Azerbaijani stage actress
- Martin Gaziev (born 1988), Bulgarian footballer
- Rahim Gaziyev (born 1943), Azerbaijani politician and Defense Minister (1992–1993)
- Ruslan Gaziev (born 1999), Canadian swimmer
- Sevil Gaziyeva (1940–1963), Soviet Azerbaijani worker and labor hero
- Shamil Gaziev (born 1990), Russian mixed martial artist
- Tarkhan Gaziyev (born 1965), Chechen militant commander
