= Khurshid Aghayeva =

Azerbaijani musicologist

Khurshid Agaeva
- Xurşid Ağayeva
- Born: April 7, 1906; Baku, Russian Empire
- Died: December 3, 1953 (aged 47); Baku, Azerbaijan SSR
- Occupation: musicologist
- Known for: being the first Azerbaijani female musicologist
- Notable work: The first monograph dedicated to Uzeyir Hajibeyli
- Spouse(s): Ahmad bey Pepinov, Bahadur Eyvazov
- Parents: Hasan bey Aghayev (father); Khadija Aghayeva (mother)
- Awards: Honored Art Worker of the Azerbaijan SSR

Khurshid Hasan bey gizi Aghayeva (Azerbaijani: Xurşid Həsən bəy qızı Ağayeva; April 7, 1906, Baku – December 3, 1953, Baku) was the first Azerbaijani female musicologist, pianist, and Honored Art Worker of the Azerbaijan SSR (1943).

== Biography ==
Khurshid Aghayeva was born in 1906 in Baku, into the family of Hasan bey Aghayev, a prominent public, political, and state figure of Azerbaijan. Hasan bey was the first Deputy Speaker of the Parliament of the Azerbaijan Democratic Republic. Khurshid's mother, Khadija Aghayeva, was a teacher and began working at Russian Muslim School for Girls when it opened in 1901.

In 1919, Aghayeva continued her secondary education in Baku. She received her first music education at the Piano Department of the Azerbaijan Music Technicum (now the Azerbaijan National Conservatory Music College). In 1930, she was sent to study at the Moscow Institute for the Professional Development of Music Teachers. Khurshid Aghayeva graduated from the Azerbaijan State Conservatory in 1935. She taught music history at the Azerbaijan State Conservatory from 1940 until her death, serving as Vice-Rector for Scientific Affairs of the Conservatory from 1944 to 1946.

Khurshid Aghayeva is the author of the first monograph dedicated to Uzeyir Hajibeyli, which was posthumously published in 1955. She authored several articles on Azerbaijani music and a significant research work titled Sources of Musical Culture in 19th Century Azerbaijan, which, although unfinished due to her death, remains important. Aghayeva also translated textbooks on music theory and history from Russian into Azerbaijani.

== Personal life ==
Khurshid Aghayeva married Ahmad bey Pepinov, the first Minister of Labor of the Azerbaijan Democratic Republic. They had a daughter named Sevda Pepinova. During the Stalinist repressions, her husband was arrested. Since the families of those repressed were also persecuted during this period, Khurshid Aghayeva divorced him at his own request. She later married Bahadur Eyvazov, who had been a secretary in the People's Commissariat for Education under Ahmad bey and later became a prominent doctor. Her and Pepinov's daughter, Sevda Pepinova, stayed with her grandmother Khadija Aghayeva from that time. Bahadur Eyvazov, believing that she was the daughter of an "enemy of the people," did not want her to visit their home, and Khurshid never met her again. Sevda Pepinova married a prominent actor of Azerbaijan, People's Artist of Azerbaijan (1960), one of the founders of the Azerbaijan State Academic Theatre of Musical Comedy, Lutfi Abdullayev. Sevda named her daughter after her mother. Khurshid Aghayeva's granddaughter, Khurshid Abdullayeva is currently a professor at the Baku Academy of Music, the director of the Azerbaijan State Choir Capella, and an Honored Artist of the Republic of Azerbaijan.
