= Chingizgala =

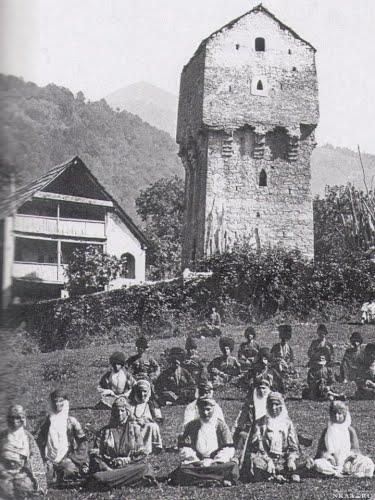
- Interactive map of the Chingizgala area

General information
- Type: tower
- Location: Car, Zagatala, Azerbaijan
- Coordinates: 41°40′22″N 46°41′03″E
- Completed: 16th century

Chingizgala or Jingozgala is a tower located in the Jar village of the Zagatala District of Azerbaijan. The towers, which gave the impression of strength and stability through their appearance, are the reflection of the harsh life of the society that created them. Chingizgala is located near the road. The adjacent area was surrounded by walls preserved only in a small part. The outline of the survived sections of the wall indicates that there was a small fortification here, and not a separate tower.

The tower is the best-preserved part of the fortification. Unfortunately, during the 20th century, the tower and the adjacent house were inhabited, which led to the distortion of the architectural features and the destruction of some parts.

== Historical and political context ==
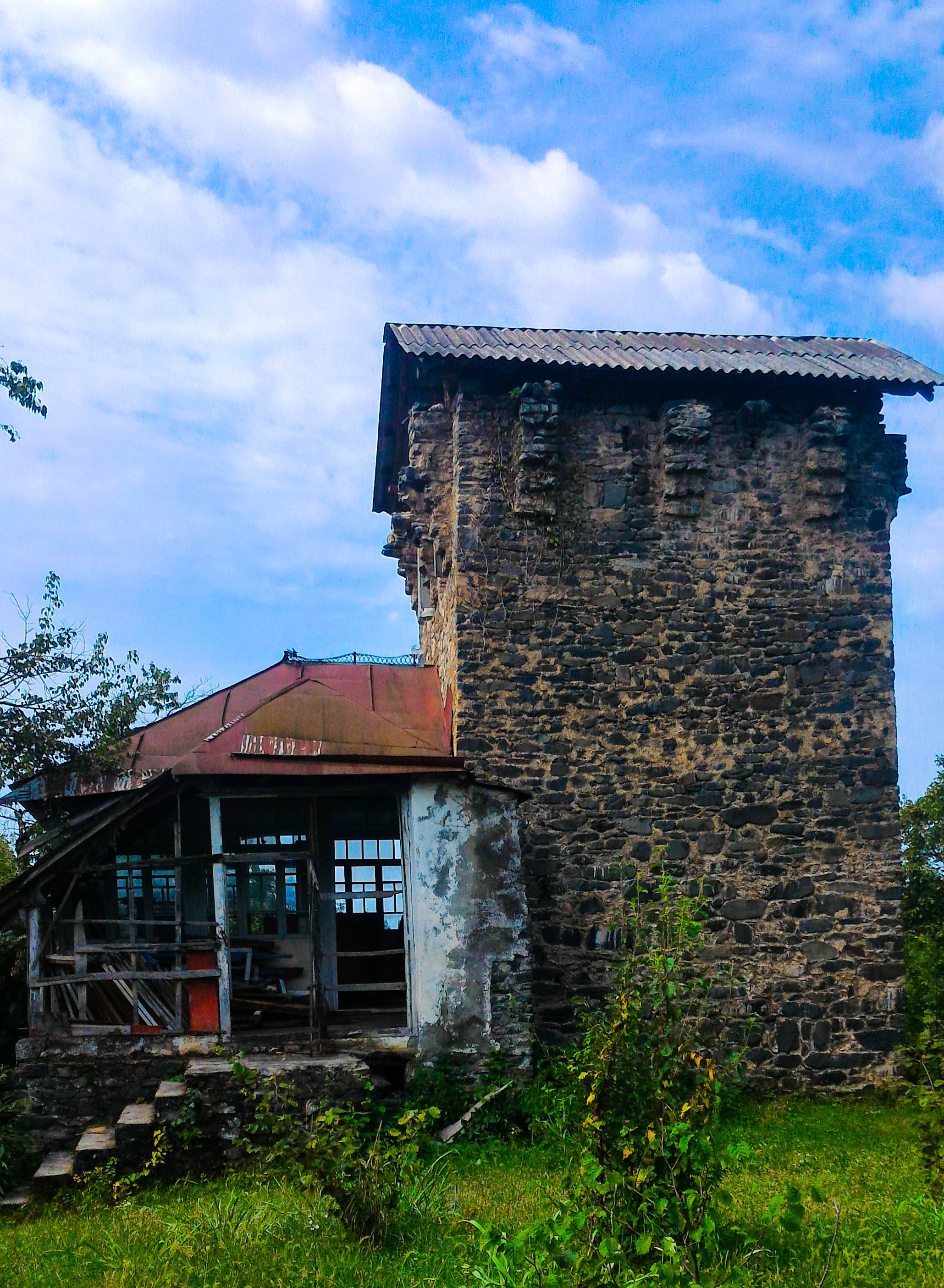
Chingizgala

The socio-political conditions inherent in the Jar-Balakan jamaats with frequent military clashes should have influenced the creation of a peculiar architecture, particularly, the development of various types of defensive structures. Here, as well as in other adjacent territories of the Caucasus, one can find combinations of residential buildings with combat towers, edifices of a castle and fortress type, and so on. Such structures were usually intended for the defence of one family or clan. The most ancient tribal fortifications could serve as a refuge not only for one, but also for several clans, a fact that should have been reflected in the size of the building.

The decomposition of the jamaat system and with the beginning of the top of the community feudalization, emphasizing the privileged families, caused the construction of a new type fortified structures; at first, these were probably separate towers around which powerful fortress walls were then raised. The further path of the development leads to the creation of a small fortified ownership.

Unfortunately, many of these structures were destroyed, most likely during the wars, especially in the last period of the communities' existence. In the anonymous "Chronicle of the Jar Wars in the 18th century" there are numerous references to the destruction of the settlements and fortresses.

== Mission ==
The towers, which gave the impression of strength and stability through their appearance, are the reflection of the harsh life of the society that created them. Nowadays these towers (even in a dilapidated form), unexpectedly growing in the dense greenery of the forests, remind of the times when the wars and the armed clashes were a daily occurrence in the life of the Jar-Balakans. People working in the field, in the garden, being in the pastures were on the alert to always have time to lock themselves in the tower and be ready to repel the enemy.

Towers were usually built on a high ground with a good visibility and natural defence conditions, as well as over the roads to control the latter. Chingizgala also belongs to this type of towers.

== Description ==
Chingizgala is located near the road. The adjacent area was surrounded by walls, preserved only in a small part. The outline of the survived sections of the wall indicates that there was a small fortification here, and not a separate tower. On the site, in addition to the tower and the remains of the walls, there is also a residential building, apparently of a later origin. It is possible that in its place there was a building of an earlier construction, which was later destroyed. No other structures were found in the immediate vicinity of the tower.

== Architectural features ==
The fortification is located at a fork of the road. The western corner of the outer walls is located directly on the fork itself. The best-preserved north-western wall of the fortification ran along the edge of the road. It is likely that there were loopholes in the wall, from which it was possible to fire on the road in the both directions, which, therefore, was completely controlled by the owner of the fortification.

The tower is the best-preserved part of the fortification. Unfortunately, during the 20th century, the tower and the adjacent house were inhabited, and this led to the distortion of the architectural features and the destruction of some parts.

The crown of the tower was completely dismantled, only strong stone brackets remained. A new door was installed in the tower, and openings for two windows were installed in the third tier.

Judging by the survived old photograph, the tower was originally five-story and was square on its plan with the external dimensions equal to an average of 5.70 x 5.60. The first floor of the tower is located at a height of 2 m from the ground. In the north-western wall of the first floor there is an entrance to the tower, in the form of a low door (1.0 x 1.6). The entrance is located at a height of 2 meters from the ground and is inaccessible to the uninvited guests.To the right and above the door, a loophole with a strong downward slope was broken through, protecting the access to the door. In the same wall there is another loophole, also turned towards the door and intended to protect it. In the north-eastern and in the south-eastern walls, two loopholes were arranged being turned towards the corners of the building. The western corner is protected by two loopholes one of which is located almost in the very corner. Both last loopholes are directed along a suitable road. All loopholes of this floor are located at a height of about 1.0 m and 1.8 m above the floor mark, respectively.

On the second floor, the loopholes are directed almost perpendicular to the facades' planes and are designed to protect the approaches to the tower's walls. There are three loopholes on the south-eastern and on the north-western sides, and two on the other two walls. The loopholes are punched at a height of 1.3-1.4 m from the floor and are designed for firing. There was a small window in the south-western wall.

The largest number of loopholes is on the third floor of the tower. In the north-eastern and south-eastern walls there are three loopholes, and in the north-western wall there are two. In addition to those indicated, loopholes are also arranged directly in all four corners of this floor, almost on the continuation of the diagonals.

The loopholes on the all three floors were obviously designed for rifle fire. Strongly expanding inside the tower, they come out on the facade in the form of very narrow low cracks, barely noticeable against the background of the unevenness of the rough masonry, and even then only from a short distance.

The fourth and fifth floors of the tower have not survived to nowadays. However, the available photograph and the survived stone brackets make it possible to almost completely restore the view of the both upper floors.

On the powerful stone brackets, three on each side of the tower, the protective walls were pushed outward, somewhat spaced from the main walls of the tower itself. The resulting gap between the main and the extended walls made it possible for the defenders of the tower to protect the base of the walls, while remaining invulnerable.

The fourth floor, judging by the photograph, was illuminated by a small window with a pointed arch located in the south-western wall. Two loopholes are visible on the both sides of the window.

The uppermost, the fifth floor of the tower was illuminated through a window blocked by a flat lintel in the same south-western wall. Two loopholes were arranged on the both sides of the window. Just like the rest of the buildings of this type, the roof of the tower was gable.

== Bibliography ==
- Бретаницкий, Л.; Мамиконов, Л. (1950). Оборонительные сооружения Закатальского и Белоканского районов (Памятники архитектуры Азербайджана). (in Russian). Baku: Азернешр.
- Хроника войн Джара в XVIII столетии (in Russian). Baku: Азернешр. 1931.
