= Qalal, Azerbaijan =

Qalal
- Location within Azerbaijan Location within Shaki-Zagatala Economic Region
- Coordinates: 41°33′31″N 46°52′29″E
- Country: Azerbaijan
- Rayon: Zaqatala
- Municipality: Əli Bayramlı
- Time zone: UTC+4 (AZT)
  - Summer (DST): UTC+5 (AZT)

Qalal (also, Kalal) is a village in the Zaqatala Rayon of Azerbaijan. The village forms part of the municipality of Əli Bayramlı.
