= Mashallah Abdullayev =

Azerbaijani national hero (1950–2022)

- Abdullayev Maşallah Babakişi oğlu
- Born: 27 May 1950; Kapanakchi, Goranboy District, Azerbaijan SSR, Soviet Union
- Died: 26 October 2022 (aged 72)
- Burial place: Goranboy
- Occupation: Military
- Children: 1
- Awards: National Hero of Azerbaijan

Mashallah Abdullayev (Abdullayev Maşallah Babakişi oğlu; 27 May 1950 – 26 October 2022) was a military serviceman of Azerbaijan Republic Armed Forces, Chief Lieutenant. He was awarded National Hero of Azerbaijan.

== Early life ==
Abdullayev was born in Kapanakchi village of Goranboy region on 27 May 1950. He studied at Gornaboy secondary school # 1 and then at the Vocational school. Mashallah started working at Goranboy Exploitation of Artesian wells project at age 15. He then worked at Sumgayit Aluminum Plant.

== Career ==
Abdullayev was called for military service in 1969. He served in Kerch city and returned to Baku after leaving the Army in 1971. When Mashallah returned, he started working at Baku Oil Rigs.

Abdullayev decided to pursue his education and entered Baku Physical Education College in 1973. He graduated from the College and returned to Goranboy in 1975 where he started working as a teacher of Physical Education at school #1.

Abdullayev gathered the youth of Goranboy region together. M. Abdullayev’s established the first Self Defense Units. He helped to combine those defense groups into a battalion. He took an active part in defending former Shaumyan (present Aghjakand) from the invaders.

Abdullayev was chosen as a Deputy to the High Counsel of the Republic (National Assembly). Abdullayev was selected as a Brigade Commander within the Ministry of Defense. The Brigade was supervising Tartar, Goranboy and Yevlakh regions.

Abdullayev was promoted to the rank of Major, and also selected as a Mayor of Goranboy region from August 1992 to May 1993. He was also awarded the medal of General M. Asadov for his bravery.

== Personal life and death ==
Abdullayev was married and had one child. He died on 26 October 2022, at the age of 72.
