= Uzuntala =

Uzuntala may refer to:

- Aygehovit, Armenia
- Uzuntala, Qakh, Azerbaijan
- Uzuntala, Zaqatala, Azerbaijan
