= Fındıqlı =

Coordinates: 41°35′N 46°27′E

Fındıqlı is a village and municipality in the Zaqatala Rayon of Azerbaijan. It has a population of 590.
