= Qarqay =

- Location within Azerbaijan Location within Shaki-Zagatala Economic Region
- Coordinates: 41°33′18″N 46°53′28″E
- Country: Azerbaijan
- Rayon: Zaqatala
- Municipality: Əli Bayramlı
- Time zone: UTC+4 (AZT)
  - Summer (DST): UTC+5 (AZT)

Qarqay (also, Karkay) is a village in the Zaqatala Rayon of Azerbaijan. The village forms part of the municipality of Əli Bayramlı. The population of the village is Tsakhurs. The postal code is AZ 6220.
