= Mişleş =

- Location within Azerbaijan
- Coordinates: 41°39′17″N 46°42′38″E
- Country: Azerbaijan
- Rayon: Zaqatala
- Municipality: Yuxarı Tala
- Time zone: UTC+4 (AZT)
  - Summer (DST): UTC+5 (AZT)

Mişleş (known as Meshlesh or Meşleş until 2001; Avar: ЧIинчIар) is a village in the Zaqatala Rayon of Azerbaijan. The village forms part of the municipality of Yuxarı Tala. The postal code is AZ 6239.
