= Chobankol Mosque =

Mosque in Zaqatala, Azerbaijan

- Azerbaijani: Çobankol kənd məscidi
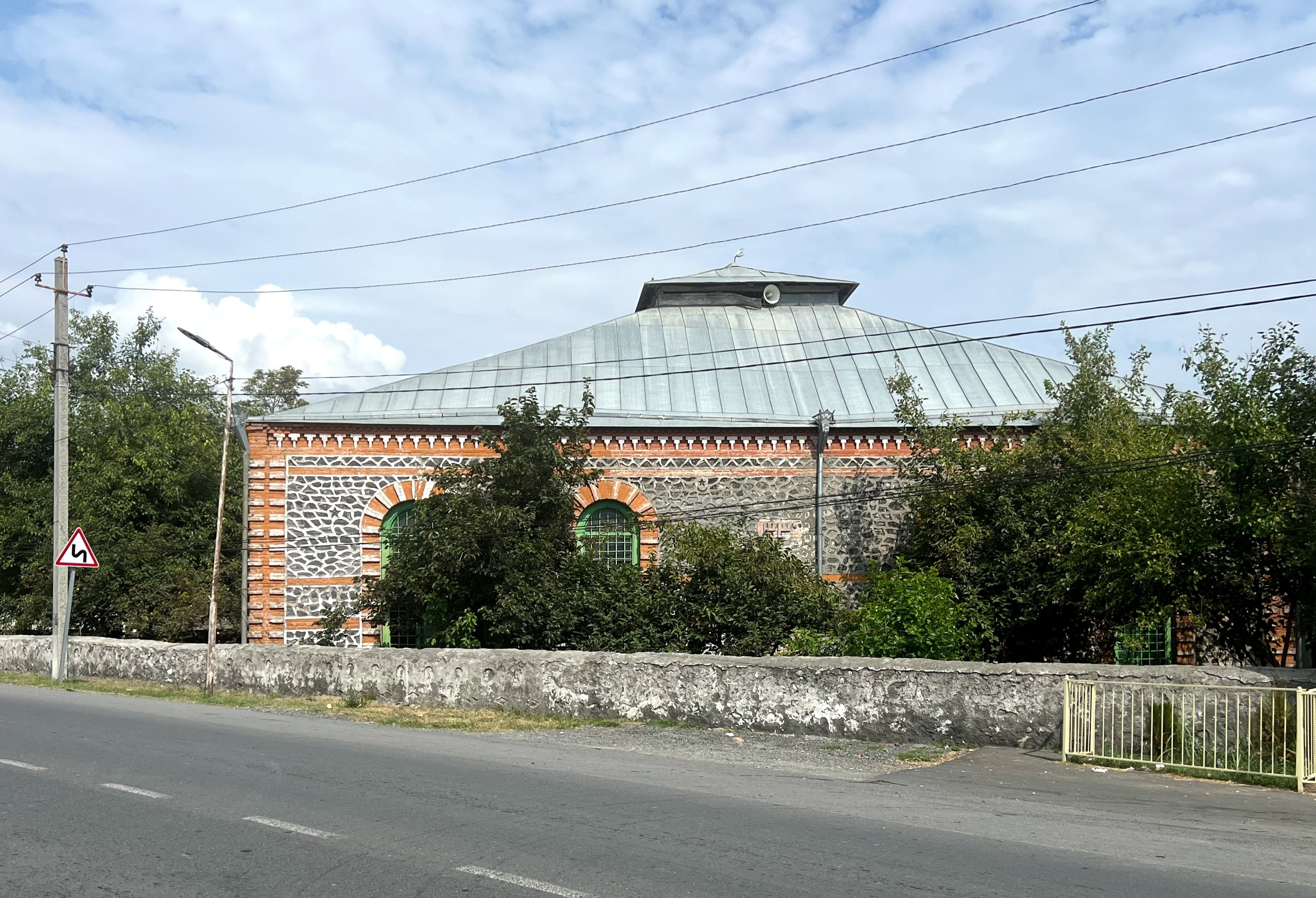
- The mosque in 2024

- Location of the mosque in Azerbaijan

Religion
- Affiliation: Islam
- Ecclesiastical or organizational status: Mosque (19th century–1928); Profane use (1928–1989); Mosque (1989–2012)
- Status: Closed (due to earthquake damage)

Location
- Location: Chobankol, Zagatala district
- Country: Azerbaijan
- Interactive map of Chobankol Mosque
- Coordinates: 41°32′17″N 46°42′03″E

Architecture
- Type: Mosque architecture
- Completed: 19th century

Specifications
- Interior area: 20 by 10 m (66 by 33 ft)
- Materials: Stone; red bricks

The Chobankol Mosque (Azerbaijani: Çobankol kənd məscidi) is a mosque and historical architectural monument, located in the village of Chobankol in the Zagatala district of Azerbaijan.

Completed in the 19th century, the mosque was included in the list of immovable historical and cultural monuments of local significance by the decision No. 132 of the Cabinet of Ministers of the Republic of Azerbaijan on August 2, 2001.

== About ==
The Chobankol Village Mosque was built in the 19th century in the village of Chobankol, located in Azerbaijan's Zagatala district, with the support of the local population.

After the Soviet occupation of Azerbaijan, an official campaign against religion began in 1928. In December of that year, the Central Committee of the Communist Party of Azerbaijan handed over many mosques, churches, and synagogues to clubs for educational purposes. While there were 3,000 mosques in Azerbaijan in 1917, the number decreased to 1,700 in 1927, 1,369 in 1928, and only 17 by 1933. During this period, the Chobankol Mosque was also closed for worship and used as a storage facility until 1988. In 1989, the mosque was returned to the faithful.

After Azerbaijan regained its independence, the mosque was included in the list of immovable historical and cultural monuments of local significance by the decision No. 132 of the Cabinet of Ministers of the Republic of Azerbaijan on August 2, 2001.

Following an earthquake in Azerbaijan's northwestern region in 2012, the mosque building was left in a state of disrepair. As of October 2022, the mosque remains in a hazardous condition and is not operational.

== Architecture ==
The courtyard of the mosque covers an area of 800 m^{2} (8,600 sq ft), and its interior measures 20 by 10 m (66 by 33 ft). The mosque is constructed from river stones and baked bricks. A stone inscription is engraved on the rear wall. It has an arched entrance door, and in front of the entrance is a porch with seven arches. The mosque also features a five-step wooden minbar.

== Gallery ==
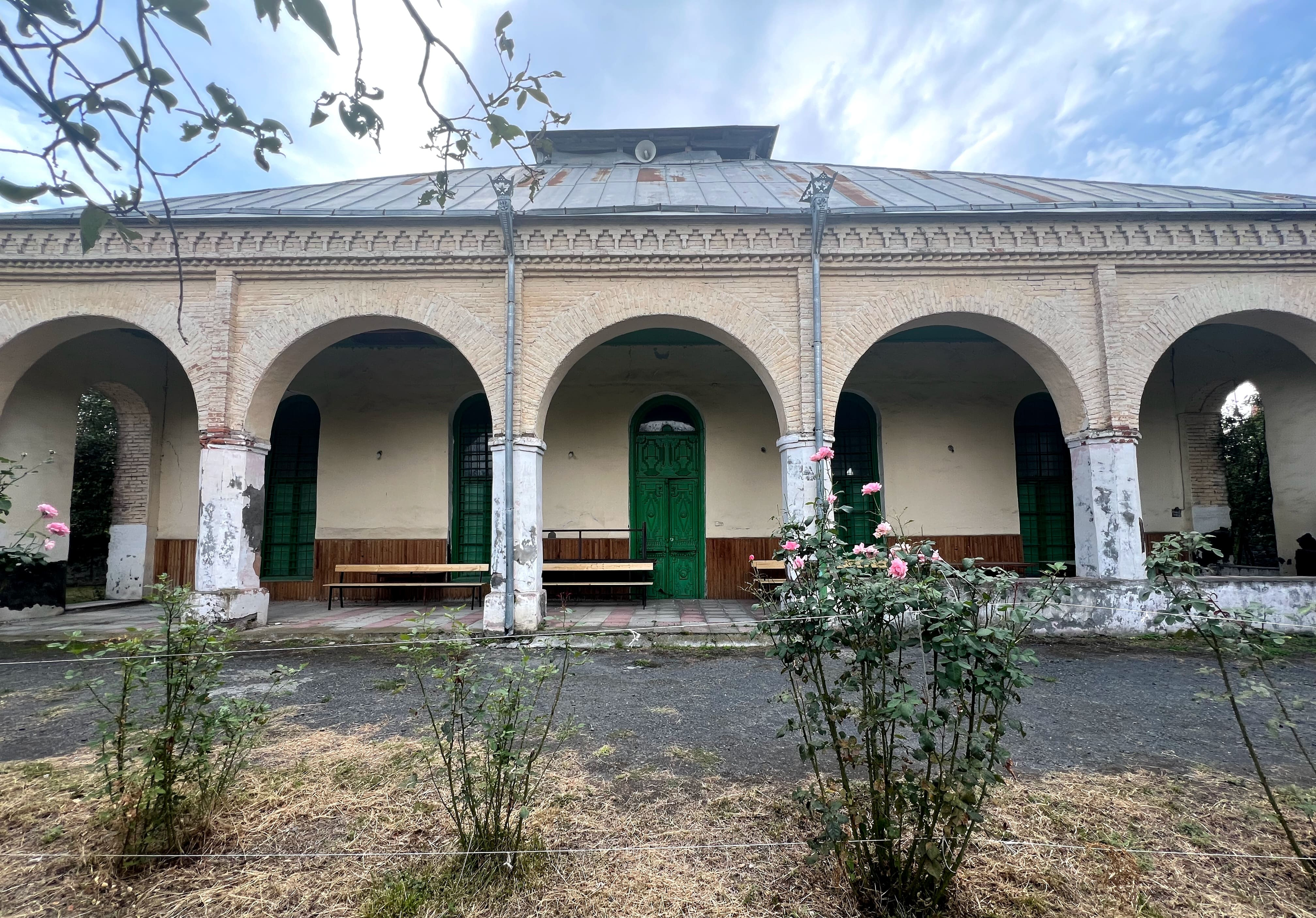

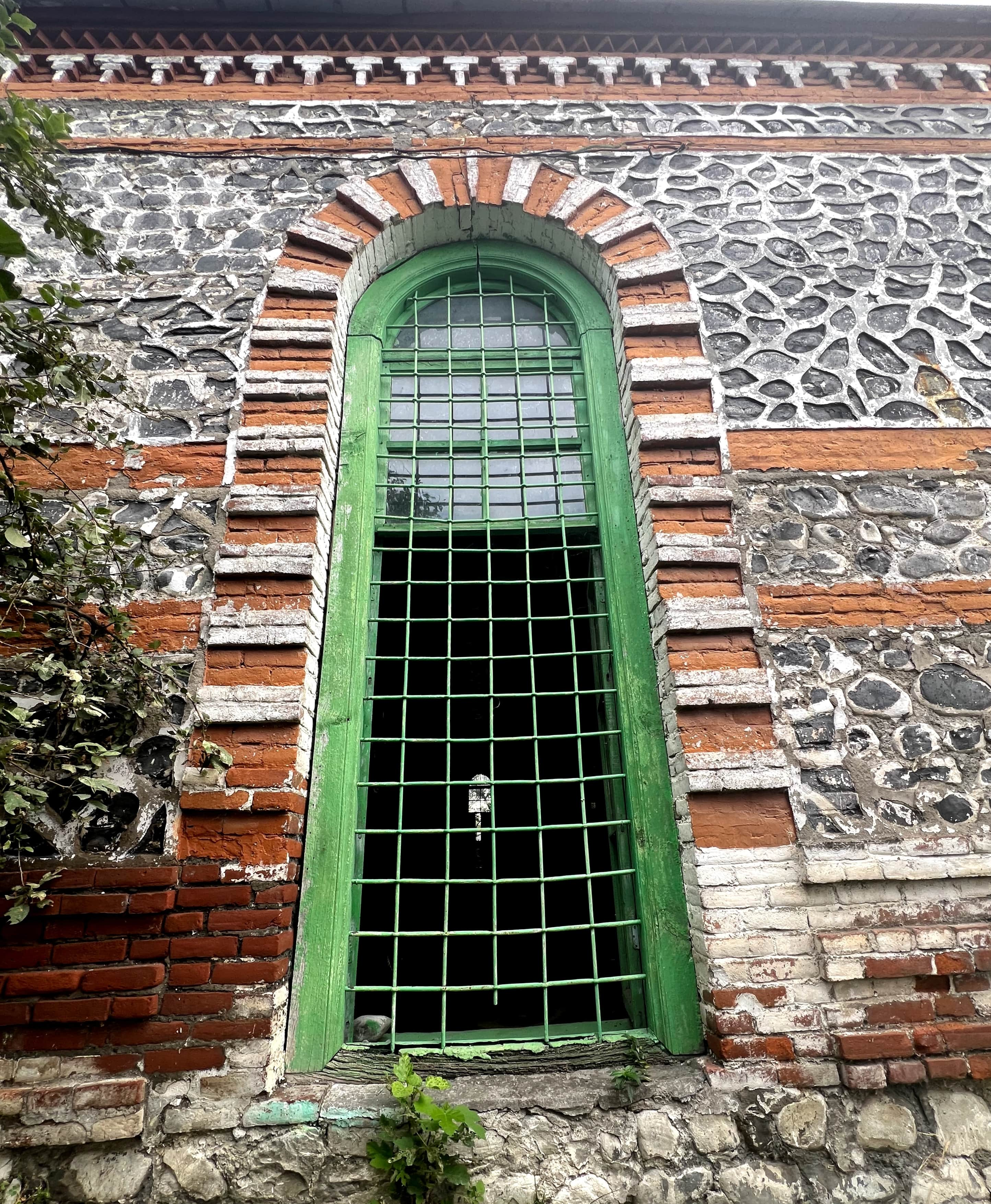

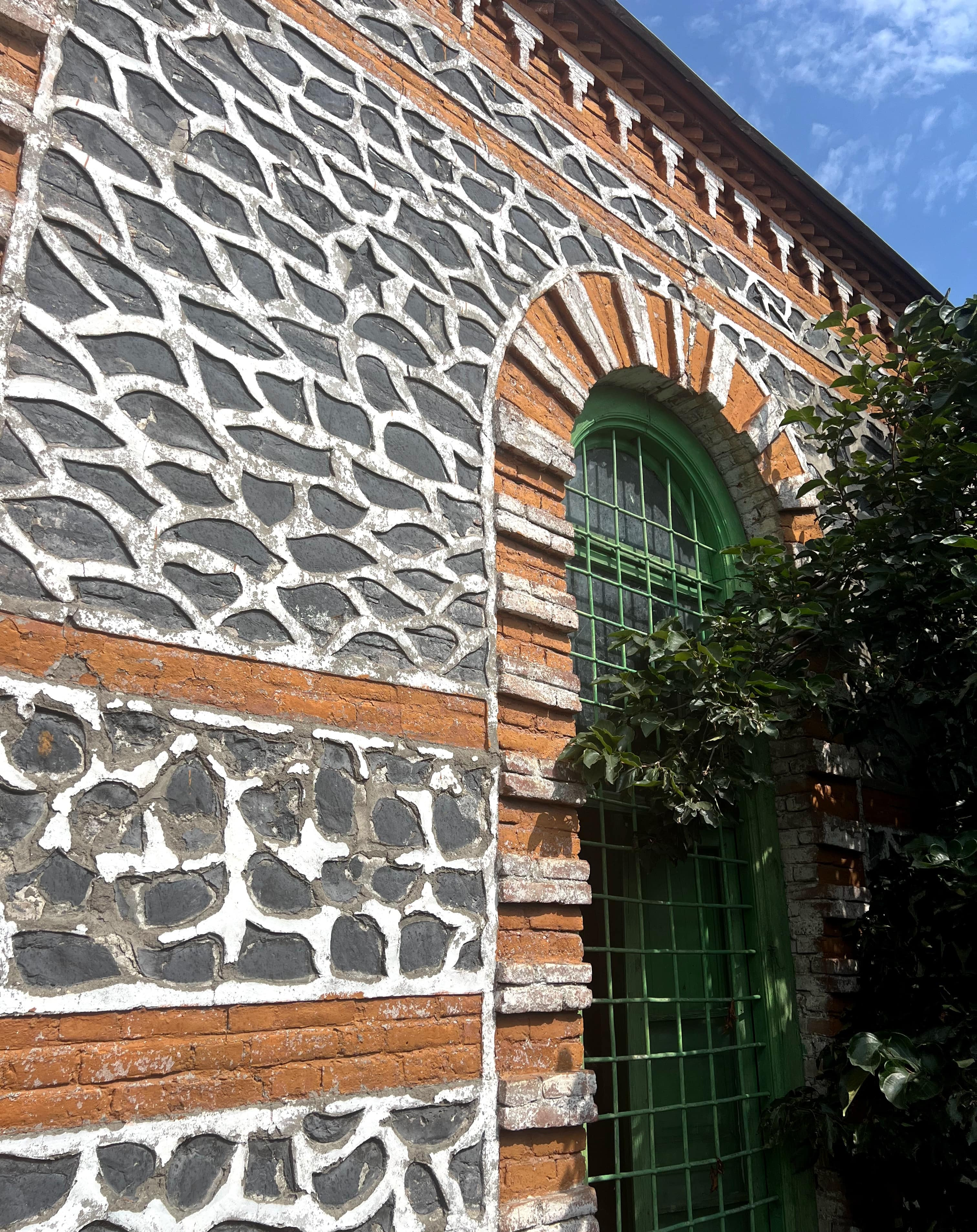

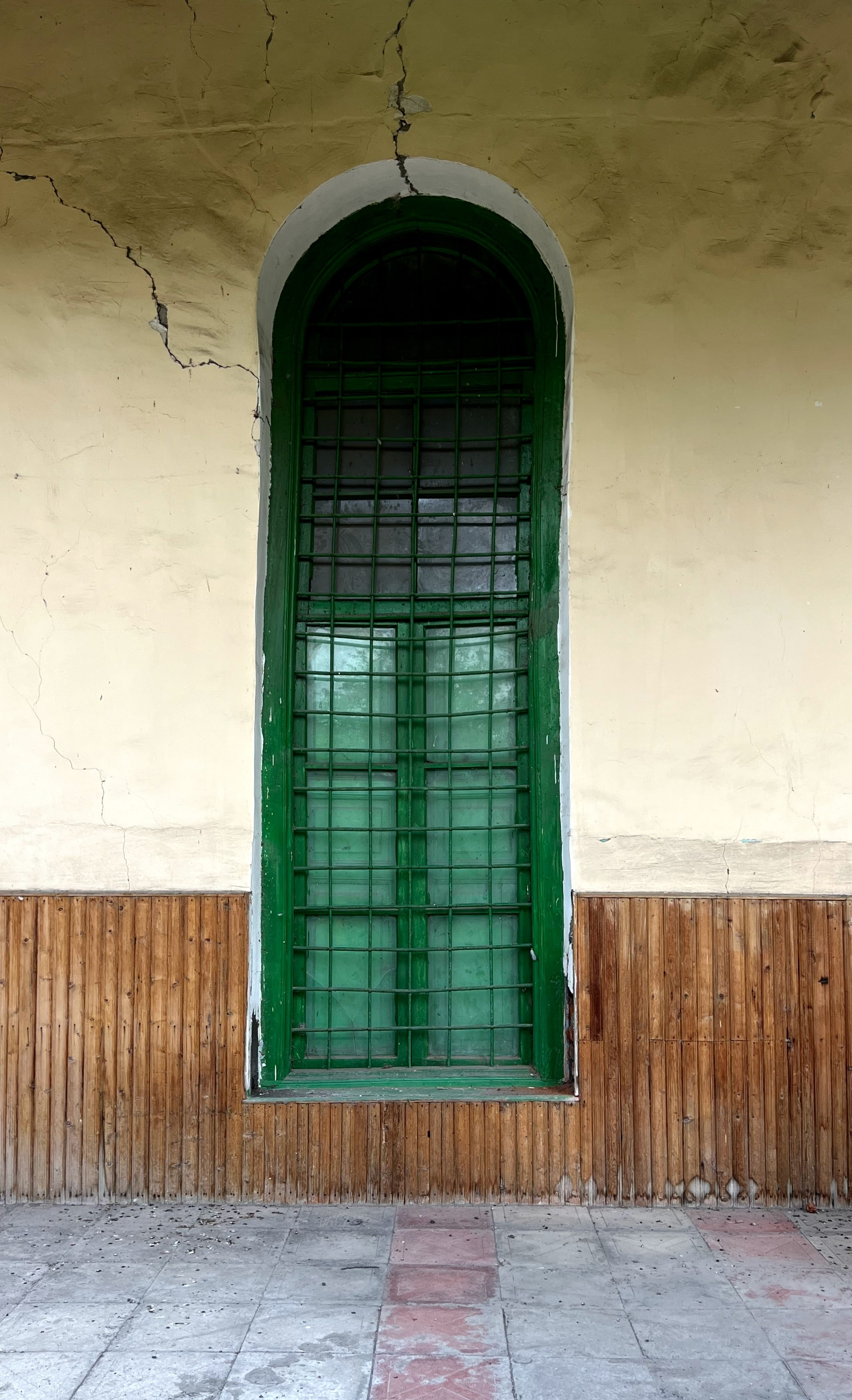

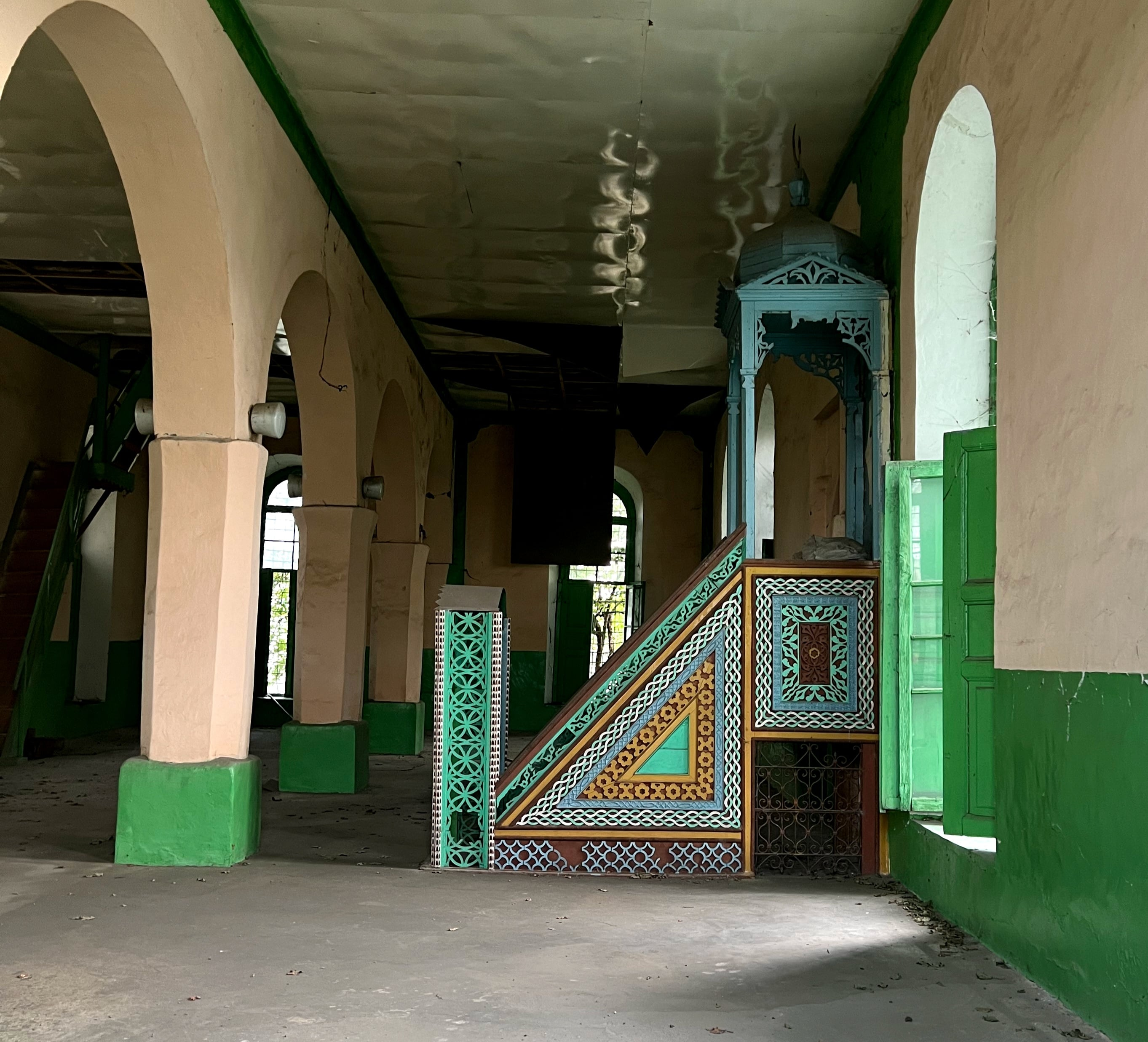

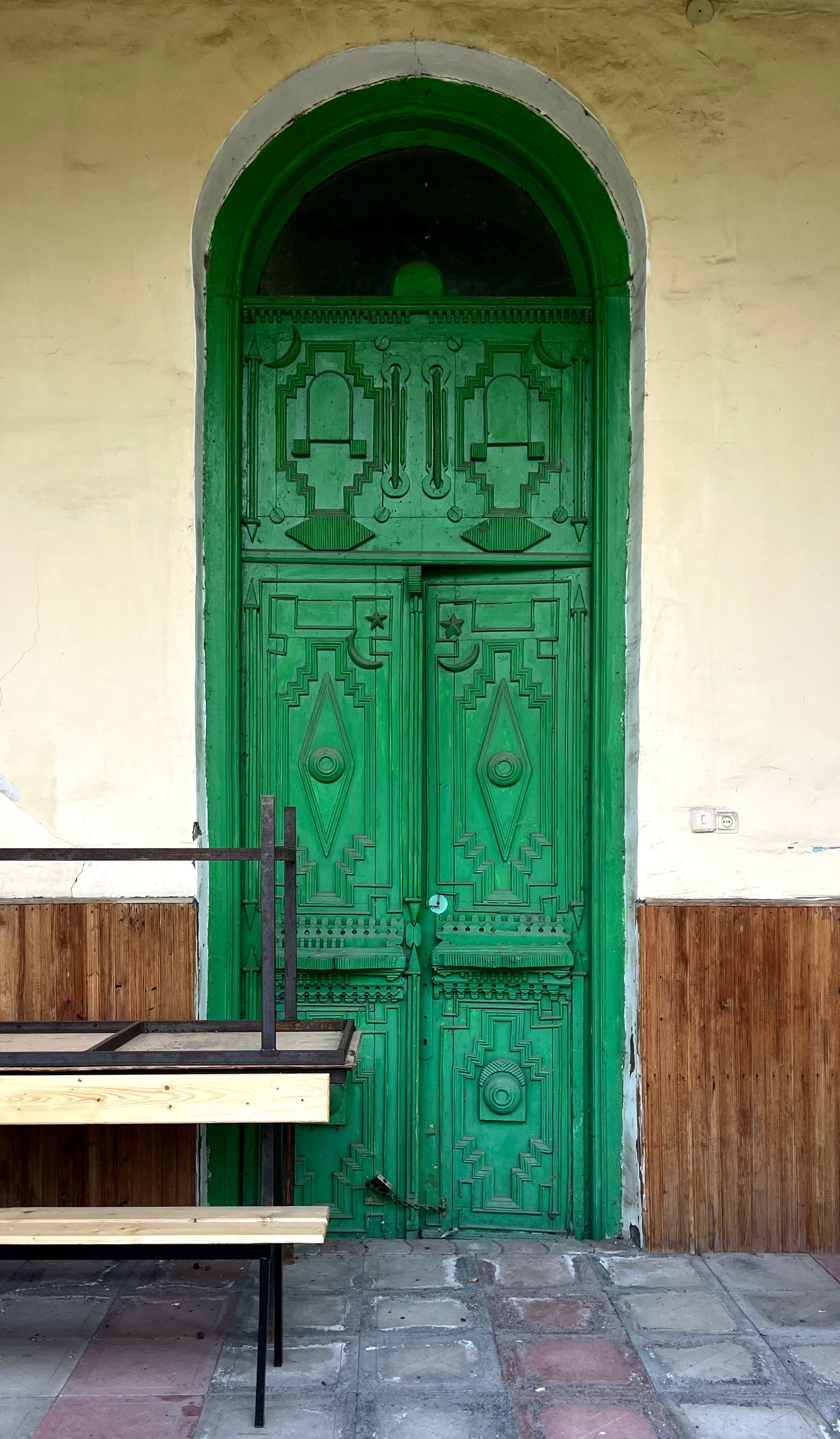

== See also ==
- Islam in Azerbaijan
- List of mosques in Azerbaijan
