= Çüdülübinə =

- Location within Azerbaijan Location within Shaki-Zagatala Economic Region
- Coordinates: 41°32′15″N 46°35′07″E
- Country: Azerbaijan
- Rayon: Zaqatala
- Municipality: Yuxarı Tala
- Time zone: UTC+4 (AZT)
  - Summer (DST): UTC+5 (AZT)

Çüdülübinə (also, Chudulobina; Avar: Чудулоб) is a village in the Zaqatala Rayon of Azerbaijan. The village forms part of the municipality of Yuxarı Tala.
