= Höytala =

- Location within Azerbaijan Location within Shaki-Zagatala Economic Region
- Coordinates: 41°34′49″N 46°29′36″E
- Country: Azerbaijan
- Rayon: Zaqatala
- Municipality: Maqov
- Time zone: UTC+4 (AZT)
  - Summer (DST): UTC+5 (AZT)

Höytala, old name Oytala (also, Voıtala) is a village in the Zaqatala Rayon of Azerbaijan. The village forms part of the municipality of Maqov.
