= Çiçibinə =

Village in Azerbaijan

Coordinates: 41°40′N 46°30′E

Çiçibinə (Avar: Жагънаб) is a village in the municipality of Mazıx (formerly Matsex) in the Zaqatala Rayon of Azerbaijan.
