= Kurdamir (disambiguation) =

- Kürdəmir, is a town in and the capital of the Kurdamir Rayon of Azerbaijan.
- Kurdamir District, is an administrative district (a 'rayon') in Azerbaijan.
- Kürdəmir, Zaqatala, is a village in the Zaqatala Rayon of Azerbaijan.
- Kurd Amir, is a village in Juqin Rural District
- Kyurdamir Air Base, is a military airbase in Kyurdamir.
