= Verxijan =

- Location within Azerbaijan Location within Shaki-Zagatala Economic Region
- Coordinates: 41°27′00″N 46°37′52″E
- Country: Azerbaijan
- Rayon: Zaqatala
- Time zone: UTC+4 (AZT)
  - Summer (DST): UTC+5 (AZT)

Verxijan (also, Varkhiyan and Verkhiyan) is a village in the Zaqatala Rayon of Azerbaijan.
