= Axaxdərə =

- Location within Azerbaijan Location within Shaki-Zagatala Economic Region
- Coordinates: 41°39′38″N 46°38′58″E
- Country: Azerbaijan
- Rayon: Zaqatala
- Municipality: Car
- Time zone: UTC+4 (AZT)
  - Summer (DST): UTC+5 (AZT)

Axaxdərə (known as Oxoxdərə, Okhakhdara and Okhakhdere until 2001) is a village in the Zaqatala Rayon of Azerbaijan. The village forms part of the municipality of Car.
