= Çardaqlar =

Çardaqlar or Chardakhlar or Chardakhlo may refer to:

- Aşağı Çardaqlar, Azerbaijan
- Yuxarı Çardaqlar, Azerbaijan

== See also ==
- Çardaqlı (disambiguation)
