= Kürdəmir, Zaqatala =

Kurdamir
- Azerbaijani: Kürdəmir
- Location within Azerbaijan Location within Shaki-Zagatala Economic Region
- Coordinates: 41°24′59″N 46°36′56″E
- Country: Azerbaijan
- District: Zagatala
- Municipality: Bəhmətli
- Time zone: UTC+4 (AZT)
  - Summer (DST): UTC+5 (AZT)

Kürdəmir (also, Kurdamir) is a village in the Zagatala District of Azerbaijan. The village forms part of the municipality of Bəhmətli.
