= Yeni Suvagil =

- Municipality
- Location within Azerbaijan Location within Shaki-Zagatala Economic Region
- Coordinates: 41°28′54″N 46°42′07″E
- Country: Azerbaijan
- Rayon: Zaqatala

Population
  - Total: 4,554
- Time zone: UTC+4 (AZT)
  - Summer (DST): UTC+5 (AZT)

Yeni Suvagil (also, Yeni Suvaqil) is a village and municipality in the Zaqatala Rayon of Azerbaijan. It has a population of 4,554 and is homogenously populated by Tsakhur people.
