= Bazar, Azerbaijan =

Bazar
- Location within Azerbaijan Location within Shaki-Zagatala Economic Region
- Coordinates: 41°32′29″N 46°39′52″E
- Country: Azerbaijan
- Rayon: Zaqatala
- Municipality: Çobankol
- Time zone: UTC+4 (AZT)
  - Summer (DST): UTC+5 (AZT)

Bazar is a village in the Zaqatala Rayon of Azerbaijan. The village forms part of the municipality of Çobankol.
