= Mazıx =

- Municipality
- Location within Azerbaijan Location within Shaki-Zagatala Economic Region
- Coordinates: 41°39′19″N 46°34′52″E
- Country: Azerbaijan
- Rayon: Zaqatala

Population
  - Total: 1,796
- Time zone: UTC+4 (AZT)
  - Summer (DST): UTC+5 (AZT)

Mazıx (also, Matsex, Matsekh, and Mazykh; Avar: МацIихъ) is a village and municipality in the Zaqatala Rayon of Azerbaijan. It has a population of 1,796. The municipality consists of the villages of Mazıx, Qəbizdərə and Çiçibinə.
