= Dağlı, Zaqatala =

Dağlı
- Municipality
- Location within Azerbaijan Location within Shaki-Zagatala Economic Region
- Coordinates: 41°31′23″N 46°31′55″E
- Country: Azerbaijan
- Rayon: Zaqatala

Population
  - Total: 2,770
- Time zone: UTC+4 (AZT)
  - Summer (DST): UTC+5 (AZT)

Dağlı (known as Ali Bayramli until 2015) is a village and municipality in the Zaqatala Rayon of Azerbaijan. It has a population of 2,770. The postal code is AZ 6220. The municipality consists of the villages of Ali Bayramli, Qalal, and Qarqay.

== Notable natives ==
- Natig Mammadov — National Hero of Azerbaijan.
