= Mamqabinə =

- Location within Azerbaijan Location within Shaki-Zagatala Economic Region
- Coordinates: 41°33′43″N 46°31′25″E
- Country: Azerbaijan
- Rayon: Zaqatala
- Municipality: Dombabinə
- Time zone: UTC+4 (AZT)
  - Summer (DST): UTC+5 (AZT)

Mamqabinə (also, Mamkabina) is a village in the Zaqatala Rayon of Azerbaijan. The village forms part of the municipality of Dombabinə.
