= Qandax =

- Municipality
- Location within Azerbaijan Location within Shaki-Zagatala Economic Region
- Coordinates: 41°28′37″N 46°32′29″E
- Country: Azerbaijan
- Rayon: Zaqatala

Population
  - Total: 1,654
- Time zone: UTC+4 (AZT)
  - Summer (DST): UTC+5 (AZT)

Qandax (also, Kandak and Kandakh) is a village and municipality in the Zaqatala Rayon of Azerbaijan. It has a population of 1,654.
