= Çobankol =

- Municipality
- Location within Azerbaijan Location within Shaki-Zagatala Economic Region
- Coordinates: 41°32′22″N 46°41′57″E
- Country: Azerbaijan
- Rayon: Zaqatala

Population
  - Total: 4,212
- Time zone: UTC+4 (AZT)
  - Summer (DST): UTC+5 (AZT)

Çobankol (also, Chobankël and Chobankol’) is a village and municipality in the Zaqatala Rayon of Azerbaijan. It has a population of 4,212. The municipality consists of the villages of Çobankol, Bazar, and Qımır. The postal code is AZ 6215.

== See also ==
- Chobankol Mosque
