= Xanmədbinə =

Village in Azerbaijan

Coordinates: 41°33′N 46°30′E

Xanmədbinə is a village in the municipality of Dombabinə in the Zaqatala Rayon of Azerbaijan.
