= Yolayrıc =

- Location within Azerbaijan Location within Shaki-Zagatala Economic Region
- Coordinates: 41°33′44″N 46°29′01″E
- Country: Azerbaijan
- Rayon: Zaqatala
- Municipality: Maqov
- Time zone: UTC+4 (AZT)
  - Summer (DST): UTC+5 (AZT)

Yolayrıc (also, Yel-Ayridzh and Yëlayrydzh) is a village in the Zaqatala Rayon of Azerbaijan. The village forms part of the municipality of Maqov.
