= Üçüncü Tala =

- Municipality
- Location within Azerbaijan Location within Shaki-Zagatala Economic Region
- Coordinates: 41°31′46″N 46°30′04″E
- Country: Azerbaijan
- Rayon: Zaqatala

Population
  - Total: 2,042
- Time zone: UTC+4 (AZT)
  - Summer (DST): UTC+5 (AZT)

Üçüncü Tala (known as Dombabinə until 2015; Avar: БитIди Тала) is a village and municipality in the Zaqatala Rayon of Azerbaijan. It has a population of 2,042. The municipality consists of the villages of Dombabinə, Mamqabinə, Bozbinə, Mücəkbinə, Masqarabinə, Həsənbinə, and Xanmədbinə.
