= Sumaylı =

Coordinates: 41°37′N 46°35′E

Sumaylı is a village in the municipality of Göyəm in the Zaqatala Rayon of Azerbaijan.
