= Abalı, Zaqatala =

Abalı
- Village
- Location within Azerbaijan Location within Shaki-Zagatala Economic Region
- Coordinates: 41°36′17″N 46°32′25″E
- Country: Azerbaijan
- Rayon: Zaqatala
- Time zone: UTC+4 (AZT)
  - Summer (DST): UTC+5 (AZT)

Abalı is a village in the municipality of Maqov in the Zaqatala Rayon of Azerbaijan.
