= Maqov =

- Municipality
- Location within Azerbaijan Location within Shaki-Zagatala Economic Region
- Coordinates: 41°35′26″N 46°29′38″E
- Country: Azerbaijan
- Rayon: Zaqatala

Population
  - Total: 4,321
- Time zone: UTC+4 (AZT)
  - Summer (DST): UTC+5 (AZT)

Maqov (also, Makov) is a village and municipality in the Zaqatala Rayon of Azerbaijan. It has a population of 4,321. The municipality consists of the villages of Maqov, Abalı, Paşan, Yolayrıc, Oytala, and Voytala.
