= Çökəkoba =

- Location within Azerbaijan Location within Shaki-Zagatala Economic Region
- Coordinates: 41°37′N 46°39′E
- Country: Azerbaijan
- Rayon: Zaqatala
- Municipality: Göyəm
- Time zone: UTC+4 (AZT)
  - Summer (DST): UTC+5 (AZT)

Çökəkoba (also, Çökəkova and Chokakoba; Avar: Чукак) is a village in the Zaqatala Rayon of Azerbaijan. The village forms part of the municipality of Göyəm.
