= Dardoqqaz =

- Location within Azerbaijan Location within Shaki-Zagatala Economic Region
- Coordinates: 41°36′29″N 46°33′14″E
- Country: Azerbaijan
- Rayon: Zaqatala
- Municipality: Göyəm
- Time zone: UTC+4 (AZT)
  - Summer (DST): UTC+5 (AZT)

Dardoqqaz (also, Dardokkaz; Avar: Дартукъаз) is a village in the Zaqatala Rayon of Azerbaijan. The village forms part of the municipality of Göyəm.
