= Parigala =

- Pəriqala
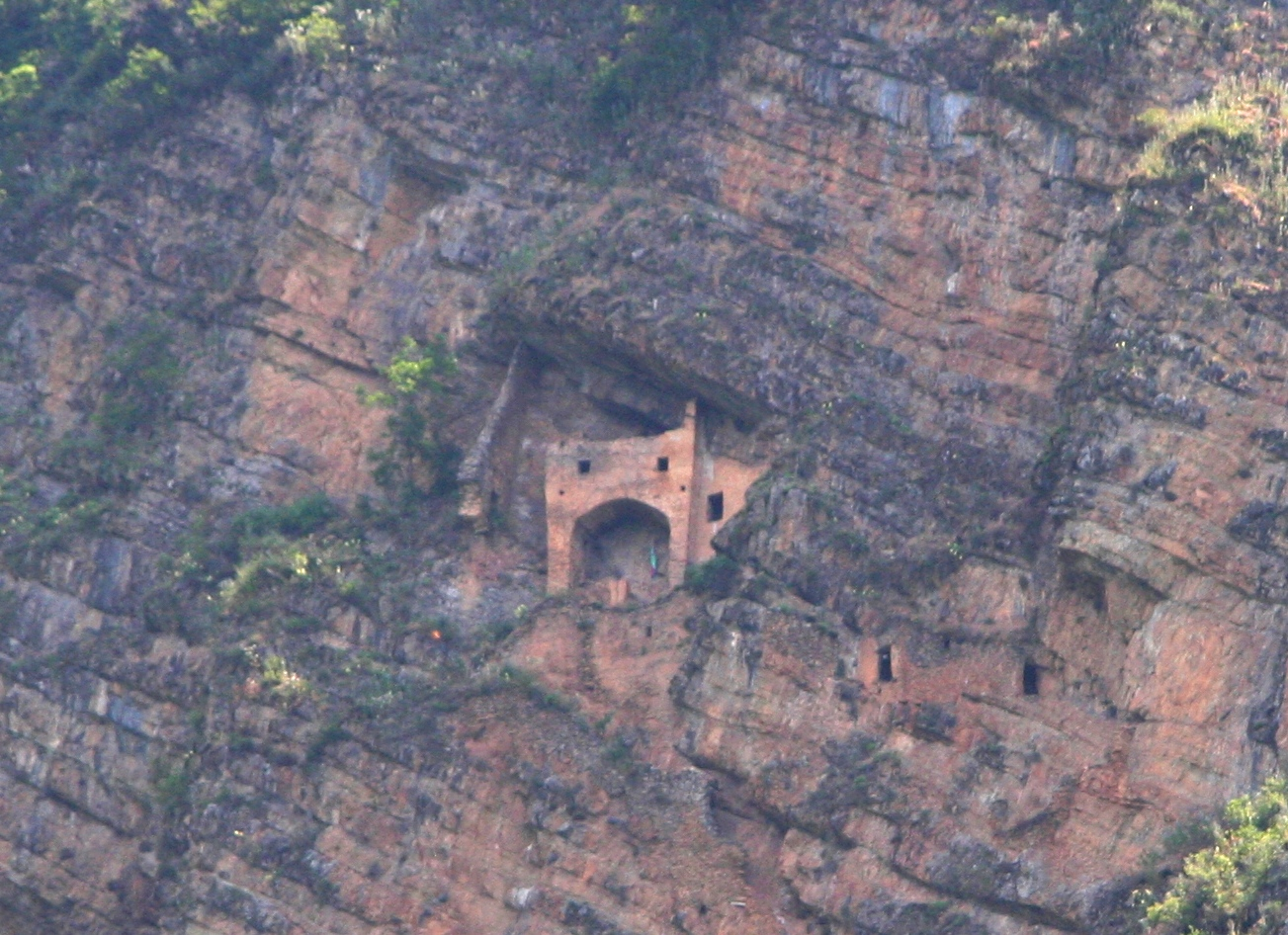
- Interactive map of the Parigala area

General information
- Type: Castle
- Location: Zaqatala District, Azerbaijan, Yuxarı Çardaqlar
- Coordinates: 41.59060°N 46.76985°E

Parigala (Azerbaijani: Pəriqala, literally Fairy Castle) is considered one of Azerbaijan's lesser-known archeological treasures and historical mysteries. The site consists of a limestone brick structure of three rooms with a window, built 300 metres up the side of a cliff in the foothills of the Caucasus Mountains near the village of Chardaghlar in northwest Azerbaijan.

The structure is believed to have been built during the Caucasian Albanian period sometime between the fourth and eighth centuries. Few visit, as it sits in a remote part of Azerbaijan and requires much effort to access. The site includes a forty-metre stairway reinforced with oak beams and also a covered walkway. Local guides have erected a ladder to access the site, which requires considerable strength and mountaineering skill to access. The site is in a state of good repair, although the top of the stairway has been separated from the rock, perhaps by an earthquake. Wear on the limestone suggests that the structure was long inhabited.

== History ==
=== Origins of the site ===
Parigala is a literal translation of "Fairy Castle", and Pari is also a female name. According to legend, Pari - a beautiful woman during the Genghis Khan (1155-1227) period - became the focus of a Mongol warlord who requested permission of her father that she join his harem. Pari had other plans. She had the castle built to allow her to flee the warlord and eventually she leapt from it to her death on the rocks below.

It has more realistically been speculated that the structure was built as a monastery for harried monks during the early Christian period, although much archaeological research remains to be done to determine the origins of the site.
