= Bəhmətli =

- Municipality
- Location within Azerbaijan Location within Shaki-Zagatala Economic Region
- Coordinates: 41°27′26″N 46°38′06″E
- Country: Azerbaijan
- Rayon: Zaqatala

Population
  - Total: 4,273
- Time zone: UTC+4 (AZT)
  - Summer (DST): UTC+5 (AZT)

Bəhmətli (known as Verxiyan until 1992) is a village and municipality in the Zaqatala Rayon of Azerbaijan. It has a population of 4,273. The municipality consists of the villages of Bəhmətli and Kürdəmir.

== Notable natives ==
- Faig Amirov — National Hero of Azerbaijan.
