= Gözbarax =

- Municipality
- Location within Azerbaijan Location within Shaki-Zagatala Economic Region
- Coordinates: 41°31′19″N 46°44′36″E
- Country: Azerbaijan
- Rayon: Zaqatala

Population
  - Total: 1,841
- Time zone: UTC+4 (AZT)
  - Summer (DST): UTC+5 (AZT)

Gözbarax (also, Gözparaq and Gëzbarakh) is a village and municipality in the Zaqatala Rayon of Azerbaijan. It has a population of 1,841.
