= Həsənbinə =

- Location within Azerbaijan Location within Shaki-Zagatala Economic Region
- Coordinates: 41°32′35″N 46°28′49″E
- Country: Azerbaijan
- Rayon: Zaqatala
- Municipality: Dombabinə
- Time zone: UTC+4 (AZT)
  - Summer (DST): UTC+5 (AZT)

Həsənbinə (also, Gasanbina) is a village in the Zaqatala Rayon of Azerbaijan. The village forms part of the municipality of Dombabinə.
