= Muğanlı, Zaqatala =

Mughanly
- Municipality
- Azerbaijani: Muğanlı
- Location within Azerbaijan
- Coordinates: 41°28′30″N 46°29′05″E
- Country: Azerbaijan
- Rayon: Zagatala

Population
  - Total: 2,466
- Time zone: UTC+4 (AZT)
  - Summer (DST): UTC+5 (AZT)

Muğanlı (also, Mughanly and Mughanlo) is a village and municipality in the Zagatala District of Azerbaijan. It has a population of 2,466.
