= Sevil Gaziyeva =

Soviet mechanizator (1940–1963)

Sevil Gaziyeva Sevil Qazıyeva
- Born: June 1, 1940; Aşağı Tala, Zagatala District, Azerbaijan SSR, USSR
- Died: September 23, 1963 (aged 23); Zhdanov, Zhdanov District, Azerbaijan SSR, USSR
- Awards: Hero of Socialist Labour

Sevil Hamzat gizi Gaziyeva (Azerbaijani: Sevil Həmzət qızı Qazıyeva, June 1, 1940 — September 23, 1963) was the first female mechanizator in the Azerbaijan SSR, Hero of Socialist Labor, deputy of the Supreme Soviet of the Azerbaijan SSR.

== Biography ==
Sevil Gaziyeva was born on June 1, 1940, in Aşağı Tala village of Zagatala District. After graduating from high school in 1958, Sevil applied to the Azerbaijan Medical Institute, but was not accepted. In the same year, she submitted her documents to Vocational School No. 5 in Baku.

In December 1959, Sevil read an article in the newspaper. After reading an article about Uzbek girl Tursunoy Akhunova, Sevil decided to become a mechanic.

In the summer of 1960, Sevil and her friends were sent to the cotton farm No. 5 in Beylagan District. During the production experiment, Sevil harvested 97 tons of cotton by machine. After graduating from the school of agricultural mechanization in Bina, Sevil Gaziyeva voluntarily goes to work in Beylagan District. Sevil Gaziyeva was a member of the Azerbaijani delegation to the 1961 national meeting of Soviet cotton growers in Uzbekistan. While in Uzbekistan, Sevil gets acquainted with the work experience of famous Soviet cotton grower Tursunoy Akhunova. After returning from Tashkent, she created a complex brigade like Tursunoy Akhunova in Beylagan and headed that brigade.

Sevil Gaziyeva, who entered the mechanization faculty of the Azerbaijan Agricultural Institute in 1962, also works and studies by correspondence. Sevil Gaziyeva, who soon became one of the most famous cotton growers in Azerbaijan, harvested 190 tons of cotton in 1962 with her machine. The brigade led by Sevil was awarded the Order of the Red Banner of Labor for taking 30 quintals of cotton per hectare that year.

In 1963, Sevil Gaziyeva was elected a deputy of the Supreme Soviet of the Azerbaijan SSR.

== Death ==
There are several versions of the death of Sevil Gaziyeva, but at the same time they all agree on one thing - the girl died while working in the field.

According to one version, Gaziyeva's death was not a coincidence, but falsified. According to the second version, Sevil Gaziyeva died while trying to save her tractor during a fire in the field.

Since the first two versions are not corroborated by the testimony of witnesses, the third version is considered the most reliable and accurate. According to this version, Sevil Gaziyeva died in a really fatal accident. On the night of September 22–23, 1963, while working in the fields, part of her long hair rolled on a combine harvester drum and tore off part of her head. When the doctor came, she was already dead. Gaziyeva's friends Ganimat and Chingiz Farajev, who were with her during the incident, witnessed the incident. Forensic expert Sabir Aliyev did not find any signs of violence on the body of the deceased.

== Memorial ==
In 1970, the film "Sevil Gaziyeva" dedicated to her was made by "Azerbaijanfilm".

A monument was erected in the park named after her in Baku in the early 1970s. The sculptor of the monument is Munavvar Rzayeva, the architect is S. Zeynalov.

== Awards ==
- Hero of Socialist Labour — April 30, 1966
- Order of Lenin — April 30, 1966
- Medal "For Labour Valour" — April 26, 1963
- Order of the Red Banner of Labour — February 16, 1963

== Sources ==
- "Азәрбајҹан ССР-ин Жданов рајонундакы 5 нөмрәли совхозун памбыгјыған машынынын кечмиш сүрүҹү-механики С. Һ. Газыјеваја Сосиалист Әмәји Гәһрәманы ады верилмәси һаггында ССРИ АЛИ СОВЕТИ РӘЈАСӘТ ҺЕЈӘТИНИН ФӘРМАНЫ". 112 (13198). Коммунист. 18 May 1966. 1.
- "Казиева Севиль Гамзат кызы". warheroes.ru.
