= Faldarlı =

- Municipality
- Location within Azerbaijan Location within Shaki-Zagatala Economic Region
- Coordinates: 41°28′N 46°31′E
- Country: Azerbaijan
- Rayon: Zaqatala

Population
  - Total: 1,767
- Time zone: UTC+4 (AZT)
  - Summer (DST): UTC+5 (AZT)

Faldarlı (also, Faldar and Faldarly) is a village and municipality in the Zaqatala Rayon of Azerbaijan. It has a population of 1,767.
