= Sabunçu, Zaqatala =

Sabunçu
- Location within Azerbaijan Location within Shaki-Zagatala Economic Region
- Coordinates: 41°35′22″N 46°47′52″E
- Country: Azerbaijan
- District: Zagatala
- Municipality: Lahıc
- Time zone: UTC+4 (AZT)
  - Summer (DST): UTC+5 (AZT)

Sabunçu (Subunchu) is a village in the Zagatala District of Azerbaijan. The village forms part of the municipality of Lahıc.
