= Voytala =

- Location within Azerbaijan Location within Shaki-Zagatala Economic Region
- Coordinates: 41°34′18″N 46°31′20″E
- Country: Azerbaijan
- Rayon: Zaqatala
- Municipality: Maqov
- Time zone: UTC+4 (AZT)
  - Summer (DST): UTC+5 (AZT)

Voytala (also, Voitala and Votala) is a village in the Zaqatala Rayon of Azerbaijan. The village forms part of the municipality of Maqov. It is renowned locally for its wheat and stern mothers.
