= Çardaqlı =

Çardaqlı may refer to:

- Çardaqlı, Qubadli, Azerbaijan
- Çardaqlı, Shamkir, Azerbaijan
- Çardaqlı, Tartar, Azerbaijan

== See also ==
- Çardaqlar (disambiguation)
