= Qımır =

- Location within Azerbaijan Location within Shaki-Zagatala Economic Region
- Coordinates: 41°31′45″N 46°40′30″E
- Country: Azerbaijan
- Rayon: Zaqatala
- Municipality: Çobankol
- Time zone: UTC+4 (AZT)
  - Summer (DST): UTC+5 (AZT)

Qımır (also, Kymyr) is a village in the Zaqatala Rayon of Azerbaijan. The village forms part of the municipality of Çobankol.

== Origins ==
Qımır is one of the villages in the Caucasus where the Cimmerians (Gmry) are believed to have settled during the I millennium BC. Cimmerians were nomads who were successful in attacking Urartu and conquering Lydia in Anatolia. According to Herodotus, Cimmerians (Qımıroi) have fled through Caucasus to Anatolia. Possible that a small group of nomadic Cimmerians, has settled in the Caucasus and the Village name of Qımır is an ethnotoponym.
