= Göyəm =

- Municipality
- Location within Azerbaijan Location within Shaki-Zagatala Economic Region
- Coordinates: 41°36′58″N 46°35′36″E
- Country: Azerbaijan
- Rayon: Zaqatala

Population
  - Total: 4,155
- Time zone: UTC+4 (AZT)
  - Summer (DST): UTC+5 (AZT)

Göyəm (also, Gegam, Gegem, and Gëgyam; Avar: Кукам) is a village and municipality in the Zaqatala Rayon of Azerbaijan. It has a population of 4,155. The municipality consists of the villages of Göyəm, Dardoqqaz, Çökəkoba, and Sumaylı.
