= Yengiyan =

- Municipality
- Location within Azerbaijan Location within Shaki-Zagatala Economic Region
- Coordinates: 41°27′49″N 46°34′15″E
- Country: Azerbaijan
- Rayon: Zaqatala

Population
  - Total: 1,247
- Time zone: UTC+4 (AZT)
  - Summer (DST): UTC+5 (AZT)

Yengiyan is a village and municipality in the Zaqatala Rayon of Azerbaijan. It has a population of 1,247.
