= Mücəkbinə =

- Location within Azerbaijan Location within Shaki-Zagatala Economic Region
- Coordinates: 41°32′57″N 46°31′22″E
- Country: Azerbaijan
- Rayon: Zaqatala
- Municipality: Dombabinə
- Time zone: UTC+4 (AZT)
  - Summer (DST): UTC+5 (AZT)

Mücəkbinə (also, Mudzhakhbina) is a village in the Zaqatala Rayon of Azerbaijan. The village forms part of the municipality of Dombabinə.
