= Çardaqlı, Qubadli =

Çardaqlı
- Location within Azerbaijan
- Coordinates: 39°20′48″N 46°31′03″E
- Country: Azerbaijan
- Rayon: Qubadli
- Time zone: UTC+4 (AZT)
  - Summer (DST): UTC+5 (AZT)

Çardaqlı (also, Çardaxlı, Chardakhly and Karadzhally) is a village in the Qubadli Rayon of Azerbaijan.

Under the ceasefire agreement signed at the end of the Second Nagorno-Karabakh War, the area was ceded to Azerbaijan on December 1, 2020 after occupation by Armenian forces following the First Nagorno-Karabakh War.
