= Lahıc, Zaqatala =

Lahıc
- Municipality
- Location within Azerbaijan Location within Shaki-Zagatala Economic Region
- Coordinates: 41°25′53″N 46°39′06″E
- Country: Azerbaijan
- Rayon: Zaqatala

Population
  - Total: 1,954
- Time zone: UTC+4 (AZT)
  - Summer (DST): UTC+5 (AZT)

Lahıc (also, Lagich and Laidzh; Avar: Лагьиж) is a village and municipality in the Zaqatala Rayon of Azerbaijan. It has a population of 1,954. The municipality consists of the villages of Lahıc and Sabunçu.
