= Əliabad, Zaqatala =

Aliabad
- Municipality
- Azerbaijani: Əliabad
- Location within Azerbaijan Location within Shaki-Zagatala Economic Region
- Coordinates: 41°28′42″N 46°37′03″E
- Country: Azerbaijan
- District: Zaqatala

Population
  - Total: 10,700
- Time zone: UTC+4 (AZT)
  - Summer (DST): UTC+5 (AZT)

Aliabad is a village and the most populous municipality in the Zaqatala District of Azerbaijan, apart from the district capital, Zaqatala. It has a population of about 10,700, and the majority of its residents are ethnic Georgians.
