= Aşağı Çardaqlar =

- Municipality
- Location within Azerbaijan Location within Shaki-Zagatala Economic Region
- Coordinates: 41°32′38″N 46°20′43″E
- Country: Azerbaijan
- Rayon: Zaqatala

Population
  - Total: 1,045
- Time zone: UTC+4 (AZT)
  - Summer (DST): UTC+5 (AZT)

Aşağı Çardaqlar (also, Aşağı Çardaxlar, Ashaga Chardakhly, Ashagy Chardakhlar, Ashagy-Chardakhar, and Chordakhly; Avar: Бехе Чардахъ) is a village and municipality in the Zaqatala Rayon of Azerbaijan. It has a population of 1,045.
