= Yuxarı Çardaqlar =

- Municipality
- Location within Azerbaijan Location within Shaki-Zagatala Economic Region
- Coordinates: 41°34′34″N 46°45′03″E
- Country: Azerbaijan
- Rayon: Zaqatala

Population
  - Total: 2,083
- Time zone: UTC+4 (AZT)
  - Summer (DST): UTC+5 (AZT)

Yuxarı Çardaqlar (also, Yuxarı Çardaxlar, Chardakhlo, Yukhari Chardakhly, Yukhary Chardakhlar, and Yukhary-Chardakhly; Avar: Эхеди Чардахъ) is a village and municipality in the Zaqatala Rayon of Azerbaijan. It has a population of 2,083.

The castle of Parigala is located in this village.
