= Car, Azerbaijan =

Jar
- Municipality
- Azerbaijani: Car
- Location within Azerbaijan Location within Shaki-Zagatala Economic Region
- Coordinates: 41°40′19″N 46°41′14″E
- Country: Azerbaijan
- District: Zagatala

Population
  - Total: 4,633
- Time zone: UTC+4 (AZT)
  - Summer (DST): UTC+5 (AZT)

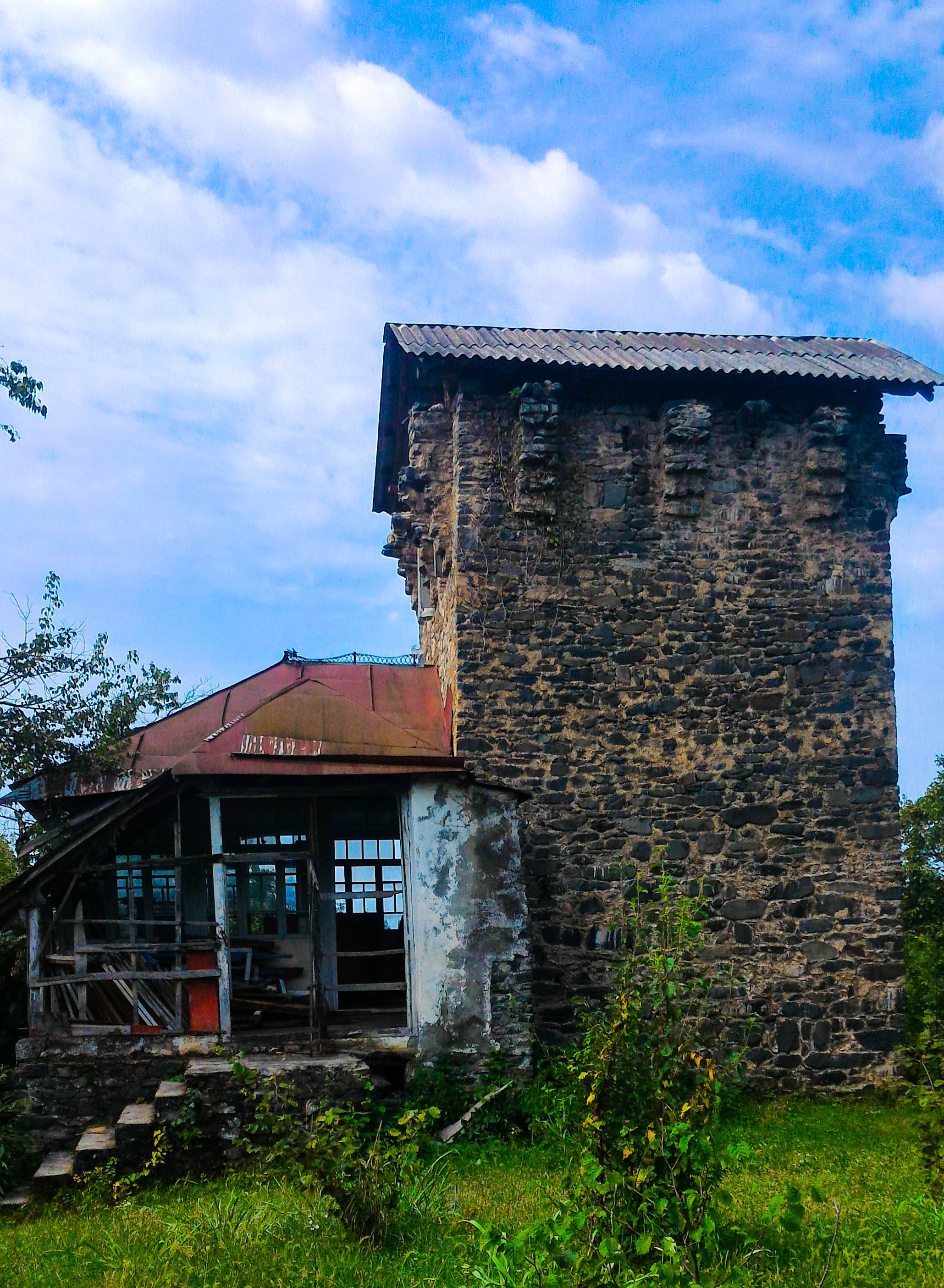
Chingizgala

Car (Jar) is a village and municipality in the Zagatala District of Azerbaijan. It has a population of 4,633. The municipality consists of the villages of Jar, Kebeloba, Akhakhdere, and Siliban.
