= Kəpənəkçi, Zaqatala =

Kəpənəkçi
- Municipality
- Location within Azerbaijan Location within Shaki-Zagatala Economic Region
- Coordinates: 41°27′30″N 46°32′28″E
- Country: Azerbaijan
- Rayon: Zaqatala

Population
  - Total: 965
- Time zone: UTC+4 (AZT)
  - Summer (DST): UTC+5 (AZT)

Kəpənəkçi (also, Kapanachkhi and Kyapyanyakchi) is a village and municipality in the Zaqatala Rayon of Azerbaijan. It has a population of 965.
