= Aşağı Tala =

Ashaghy Tala
- Municipality
- Azerbaijani: Aşağı Tala
- Location within Azerbaijan
- Coordinates: 41°36′12″N 46°38′22″E
- Country: Azerbaijan
- District: Zagatala

Population (2012)
  - Total: 6,830
- Time zone: UTC+4 (AZT)
  - Summer (DST): UTC+5 (AZT)

Aşağı Tala (Ashaghy Tala) is a village and municipality in the Zagatala District of Azerbaijan. It has a population of 6,027.

== Notable natives ==
- Sevil Gaziyeva — Hero of Socialist Labor.
- Gurban Gurbanov - Azerbaijani football manager and former footballer.
