= Muxax =

- Municipality
- Location within Azerbaijan Location within Shaki-Zagatala Economic Region
- Coordinates: 41°34′09″N 46°42′15″E
- Country: Azerbaijan
- Rayon: Zaqatala

Population
  - Total: 7,236
- Time zone: UTC+4 (AZT)

Muxax (also, Muchach and Mukhakh; Avar: Мухъахъ) is a village and municipality in the Zaqatala Rayon of Azerbaijan. It has a population of 7,236.
