= Uzuntala, Zaqatala =

Uzuntala
- Municipality
- Location within Azerbaijan Location within Shaki-Zagatala Economic Region
- Coordinates: 41°36′56″N 46°27′06″E
- Country: Azerbaijan
- Rayon: Zaqatala

Area
  - Total: 6.22 km^{2} (2.40 sq mi)

Population
  - Total: 657
  - Density: 105.6/km^{2} (274/sq mi)
- Time zone: UTC+4 (AZT)
  - Summer (DST): UTC+5 (AZT)

Uzuntala is a village and municipality in the Zaqatala Rayon of Azerbaijan. It has a population of 371.
