= Yuxarı Tala =

- Municipality
- Location within Azerbaijan Location within Shaki-Zagatala Economic Region
- Coordinates: 41°37′24″N 46°39′38″E
- Country: Azerbaijan
- Rayon: Zaqatala

Population
  - Total: 7,386
- Time zone: UTC+4 (AZT)
  - Summer (DST): UTC+5 (AZT)
- Postal code: AZ6239

Yuxarı Tala (also, Birindzhi-Tala and Yukhary-Tala; Avar: Эхеди Тала) is a village and municipality in the Zaqatala Rayon of Azerbaijan. It has a population of 7,386. The municipality consists of the villages of Yuxarı Tala, Çudulubinə, Laqodexbinə, and Meşleş.
