= Ahmad bey Pepinov =

Azerbaijani politician (1893–1938)

Ahmad bey Pepinov Ahmet Bey Pepinov
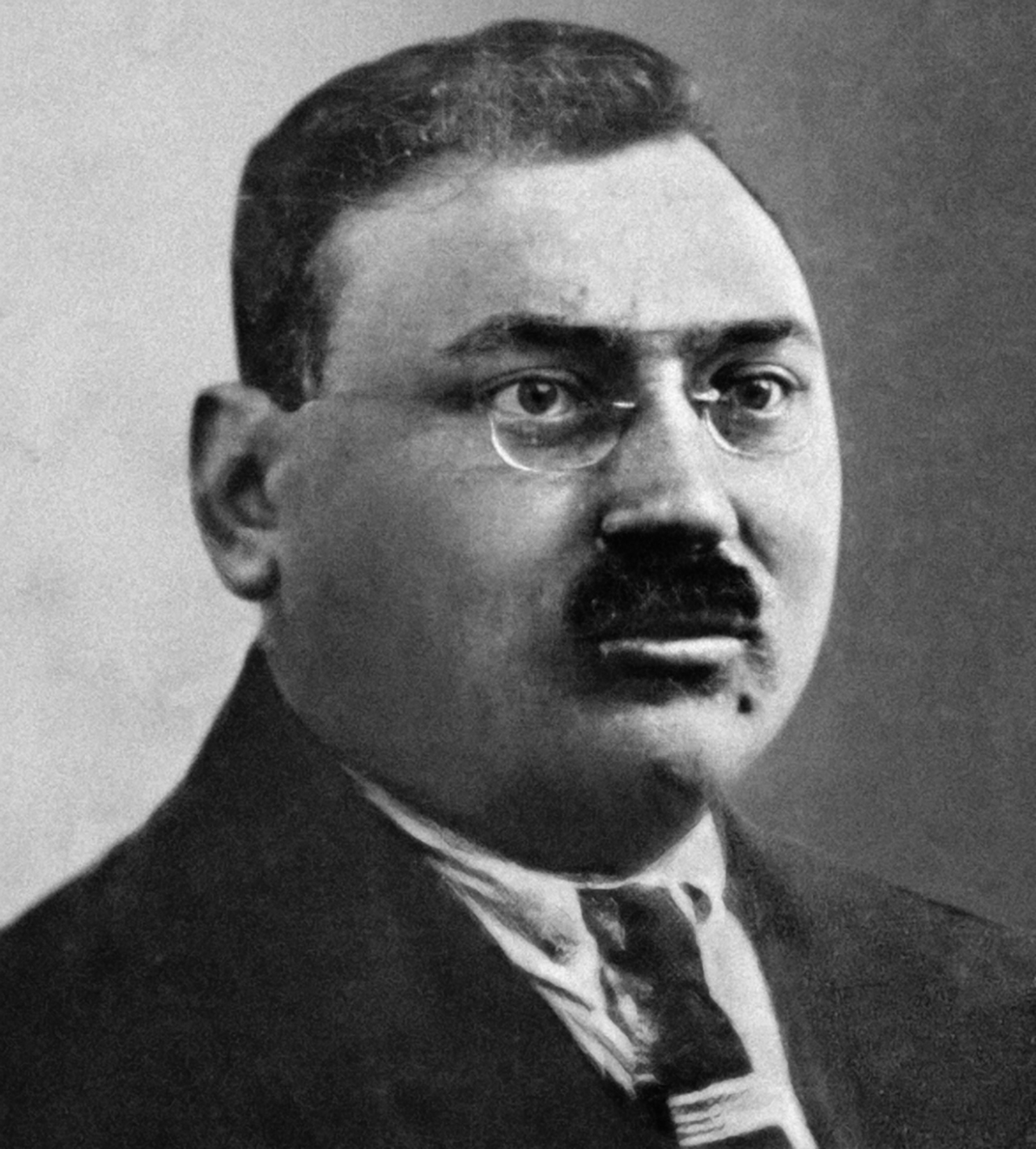

Minister of Agriculture of Azerbaijan Democratic Republic (ADR)
- In office December 22, 1919 – April 1, 1920
- President: Nasib Yusifbeyli Prime Minister, (Chairman of Azerbaijani Parliament)
- Preceded by: Aslan bey Gardashov
- Succeeded by: office terminated

Personal details
- Born: September 11, 1893 Bolojur, Akhaltsikhe Uyezd, Russian Empire
- Died: July 3, 1938 (aged 44) Alma Ata, Kazakhstan

Ahmad bey Pepinov Omar oglu (Turkish: Ahmet Bey Ömeroğlu Pepinov; September 11, 1893 – July 3, 1938), also known as Ahmet bey Pepinov, was an statesman of Turkish Meskhetian origin who served as Minister of Agriculture in the fifth cabinet of Azerbaijan Democratic Republic, and was member of Parliament of Azerbaijan.

== Early years ==
Pepinov was born on September 11, 1893, in a small village of Bolojur in Akhaltsikhe Uyezd of Tiflis Governorate. After completing Tiflis Gymnasium in 1913, he left for Russia to study at the Law Department of Moscow State University. In Moscow, he joined the Azerbaijani Compatriots Organization and published articles in the local Open Argument newspaper under pseudonym "Ahmad Jovdat from Akhalkalaki". In 1918, he graduated from the university and moved to Baku. He was then elected as a deputy to Muslim faction of Transcaucasian Sejm.

== Political career ==
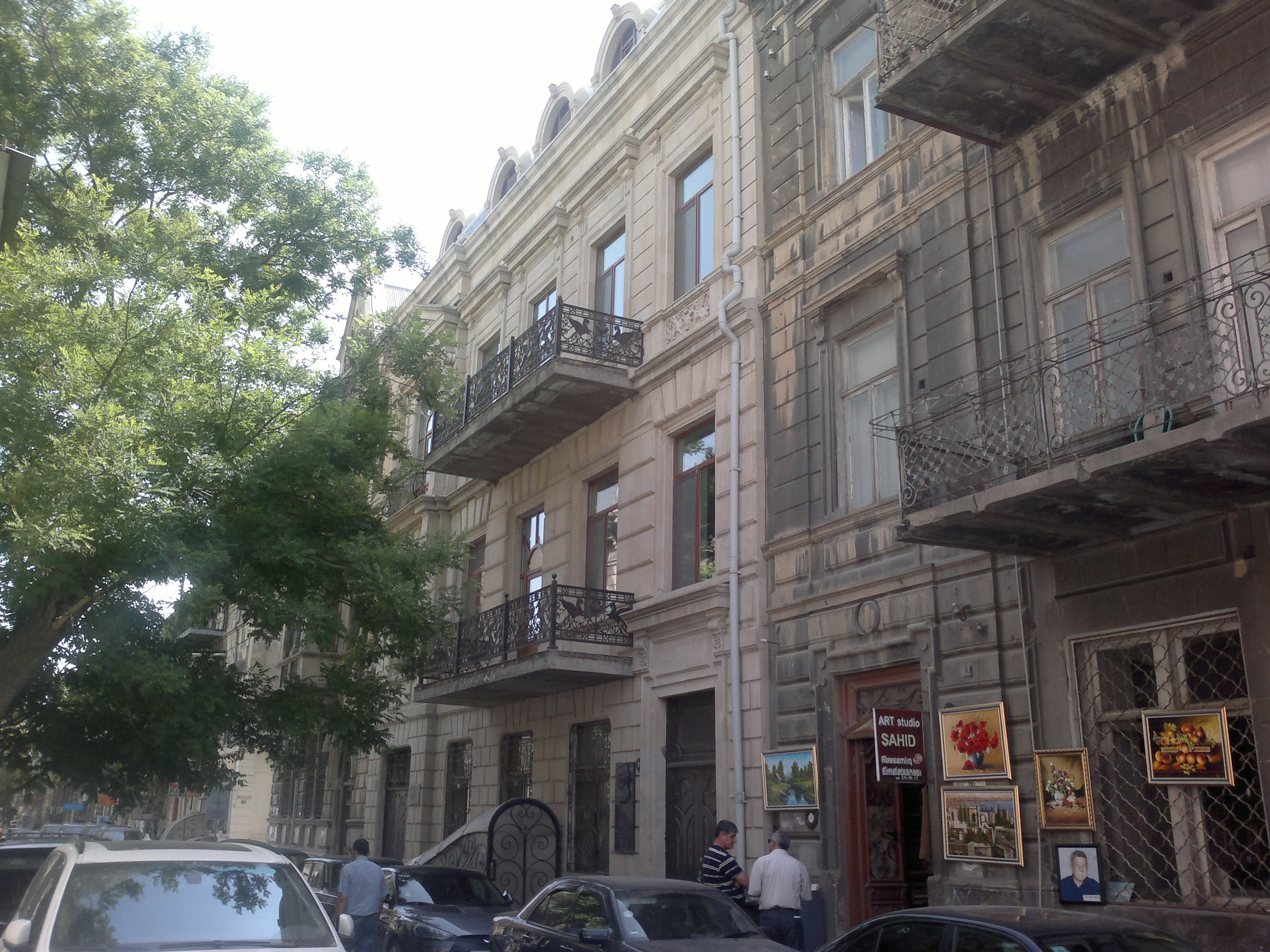
Building in Baku where Pepinov lived

In the first half of 1918, he joined the Azerbaijani National Council and was among the members who proclaimed independence of Azerbaijan on May 28, 1918. After being elected a deputy to the National Assembly of Azerbaijan from Muslim Socialist Bloc, Pepinov wrote draft laws for the developing press publishing sector. On December 22, 1919, when the fifth government of ADR under the leadership of Nasib Yusifbeyli was formed, he was appointed the Minister of Agriculture serving until April 1, 1920, when the government dissolved. He played an important part in establishment of Baku State University in 1919.

After Bolshevik takeover of Azerbaijan, he supervised cultural and educational activities within the government of Azerbaijan SSR. Avoiding constant persecution, he moved to Ulyanovsk in 1930, and from there to Alma Ata. In 1934, he was appointed Deputy Minister of Education of Kazakh SSR. In 1938, Pepinov was arrested as a result of Stalinist repressions. On July 3, 1938, he was shot.

== See also ==
- Azerbaijani National Council
- Cabinets of Azerbaijan Democratic Republic (1918–1920)
- Current Cabinet of Azerbaijan Republic
