= Kəpənəkçi, Goranboy =

Kəpənəkçi
- Location within Azerbaijan
- Coordinates: 40°37′N 46°48′E
- Country: Azerbaijan
- Rayon: Goranboy
- Time zone: UTC+4 (AZT)
  - Summer (DST): UTC+5 (AZT)

Kəpənəkçi (also, Kapanakchi) is a village in the Goranboy Rayon of Azerbaijan.
