= General Chavchavadze =

General Chavchavadze may refer to:

- Alexander Chavchavadze (1786–1846), Imperial Russian Army lieutenant general
- Nikolay Zurabovich Chavchavadze (1830–1897), Imperial Russian Army adjutant general and General of the cavalry
- Zakhary Gulbatovich Chavchavadze (1825–1905), Imperial Russian Army adjutant general and General of the cavalry
