= Battle of Niakhura =

Battle between the Avar Khanate and a Russian–Georgian alliance (1800)

Coordinates: 41.7083°N 45.4944°E

- Part of Lekianoba
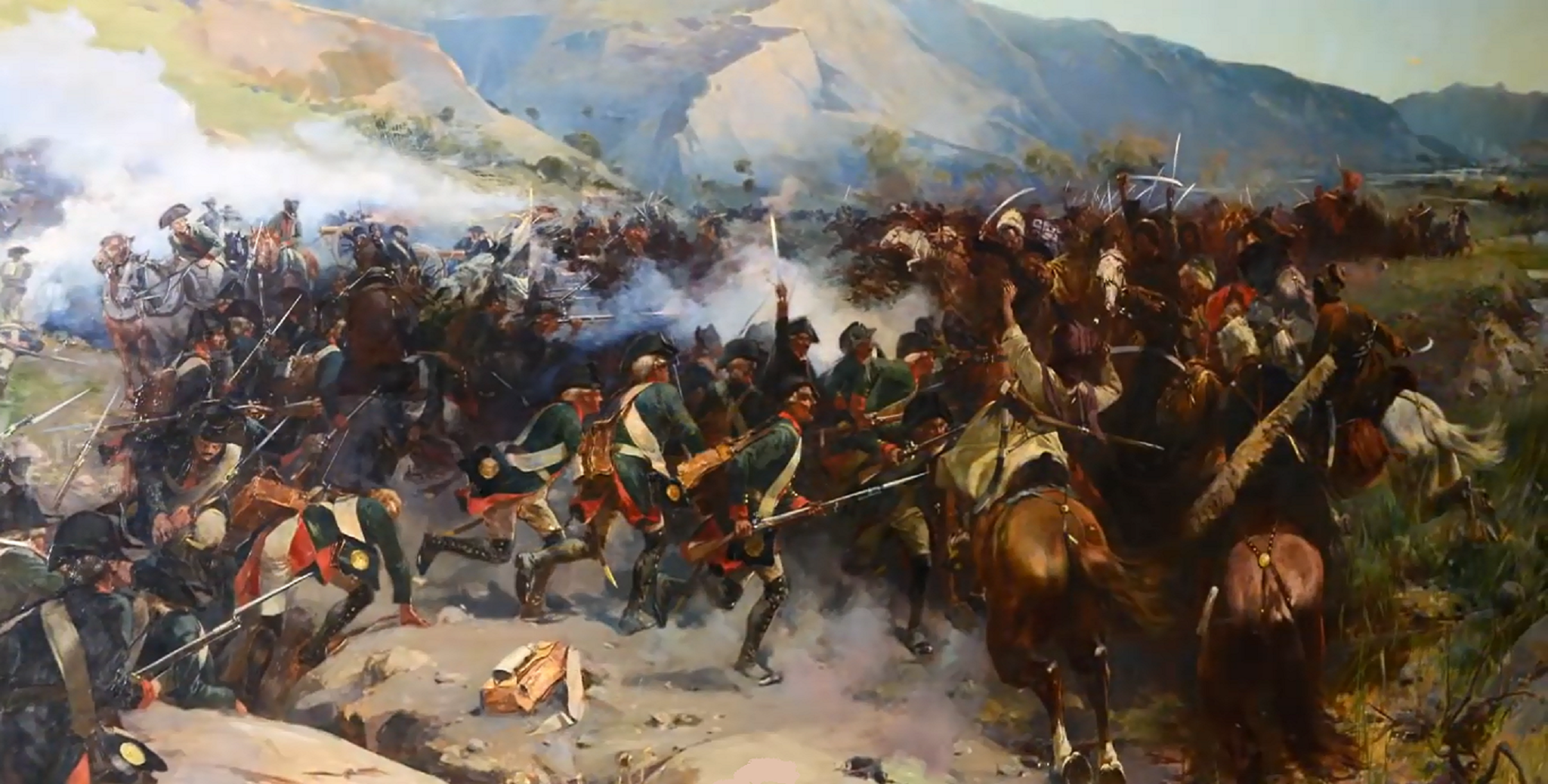
- The battle by Nikolay Samokish
Date	7 November 1800
Location	Niakhura, Iori river, Kingdom of Kartli-Kakheti
Result	Russian–Georgian victory

Belligerents
Russian Empire; Kingdom of Kartli-Kakheti	Avar Khanate; Georgian rebels

Commanders and leaders
(Russian Empire) Ivan Lazarev (Russian Empire) Vasily Gulyakov; Prince Ioane; Prince Bagrat	Umma Khan (WIA); Prince Alexander (WIA)

Strength
4,224–11,224 men (1,224 Russians and 3,000–10,000 Georgians)	15,000–20,000 men

Casualties and losses
Russian: 3 men (1 killed and 2 wounded); Georgians: Unknown	1,500–2,000 killed

The Battle of Niakhura, also known as the Battle of Iori River and Battle of Kakabeti, took place on 7 November 1800. During this battle, the invading army of Umma Khan V, which had entered the territory of the Kingdom of Kartli-Kakheti (Georgia) in alliance with the Georgian prince Alexander, suffered a crushing defeat.The victorious forces consisted of two Russian battalions under Major Generals Ivan Lazarev and Vasily Gulyakov, supported by the Georgian militia commanded by princes Ioane and Bagrat.

This battle marked a decisive episode in the defense of eastern Georgia against incursions from the north Caucasian highlands, consolidating Russian influence in the region and weakening the opposition to the reigning Georgian monarch.

== Background ==
At the end of the 18th century, the Kingdom of Kartli-Kakheti faced constant attacks from the Persian and Ottoman Empires (the latter from the direction of Akhaltsikhe), as well as systematic raids by North Caucasian mountaineers. These incursions caused irreparable damage to both the material and human resources of Georgia. At the same time, internal strife within the ruling Bagrationi dynasty intensified following the death of King Heraclius II in 1798 and the accession of his son by his second marriage, George XII. Although the raids inflicted severe losses upon the kingdom, George XII, seeking protection from his rebellious brothers, was compelled to maintain in his service up to 7,000 of the same mountaineers (the Lezgin Corps), paying them substantial wages while overlooking their acts of lawlessness, including looting and violence even in Tbilisi itself.

The most influential Dagestani ruler of the time, Umma Khan V, received from George an annual tribute of 5,000 rubles (presented as a “gift”) to deter him from raiding Georgian territory. Nevertheless, other Dagestani chieftains continued to conduct independent incursions into Georgian lands. The population suffered under unbearable taxation, while the central authority of the monarchy was effectively abolished.

In addition, at the beginning of 1798, an outbreak of the plague spread rapidly across eastern Georgia, exacerbating the crisis. Faced with so many hardships, many inhabitants abandoned the country altogether.

At the same time, the Russian Emperor Paul I did not yet recognize George XII as king of Kartli-Kakheti and, contrary to the Treaty of Georgievsk of 1783—concluded between Catherine II and Heraclius II (at the latter's request), placing Georgia under Russian protection—Paul refused to provide any assistance to the Georgian kingdom.

In 1798, the Persian shah Fath-Ali offered George his patronage, warning that otherwise the Persian army would again devastate his land and capital. Losing hope in Russia, George that same year secretly sent Prince Aslan Orbeliani to the Ottoman sultan Abdul Hamid I with a request to accept Georgia under the Porte's protection. However, while Orbeliani was still in Akhaltsikhe, George's son David arrived in Tbilisi from St. Petersburg, bringing news of “the emperor Paul’s gracious disposition toward Georgia.” George immediately recalled Orbeliani and sent the same petition to Paul, explaining the situation and requesting the dispatch of 3,000 (or, in another letter, 5,000) Russian soldiers “fully armed and equipped with all military provisions.”

== Arrival of Russian troops in Georgia ==
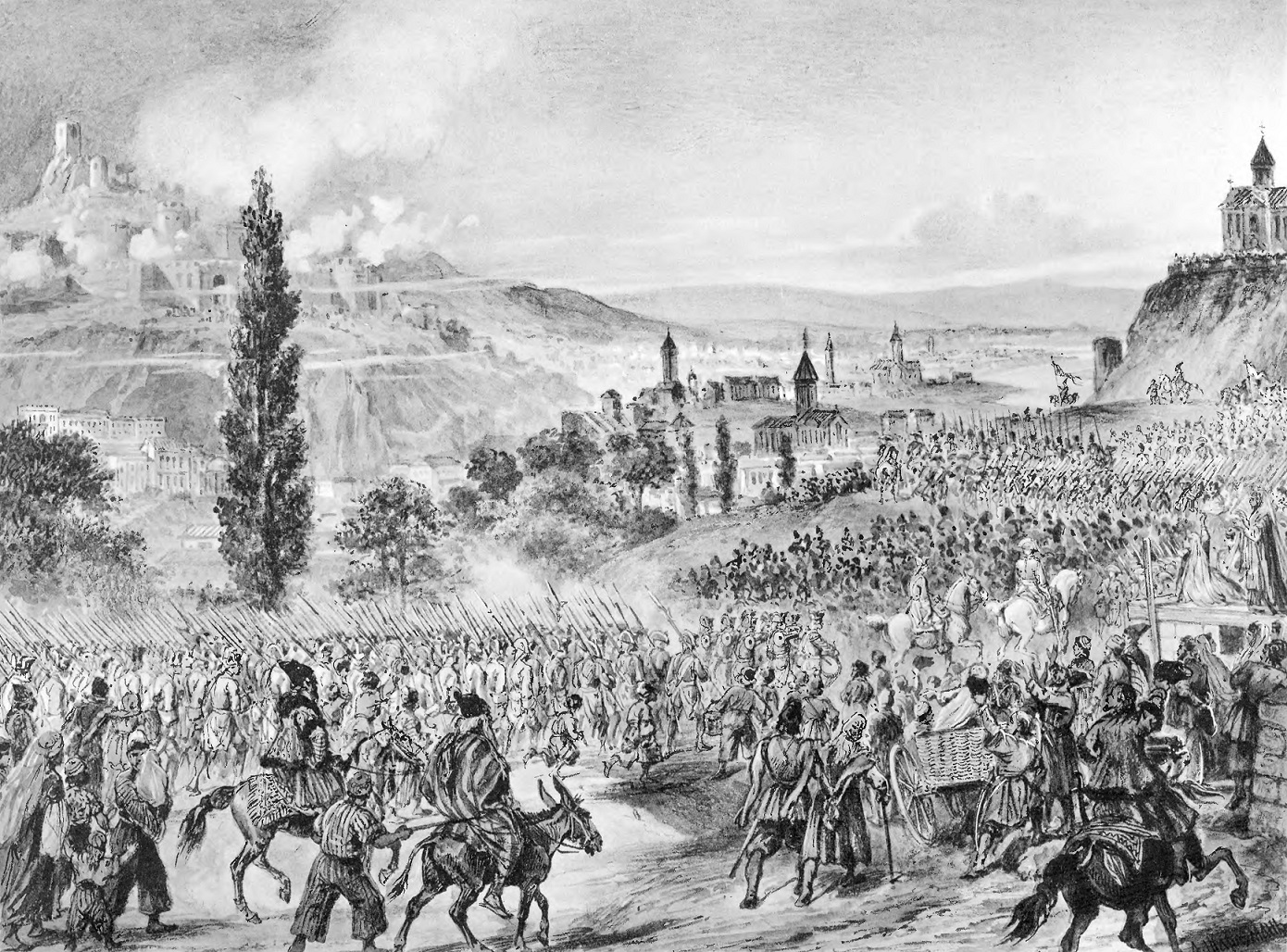
Entry of the Jaeger Major General Lazarev regiment into Tbilisi on November 26, 1799.

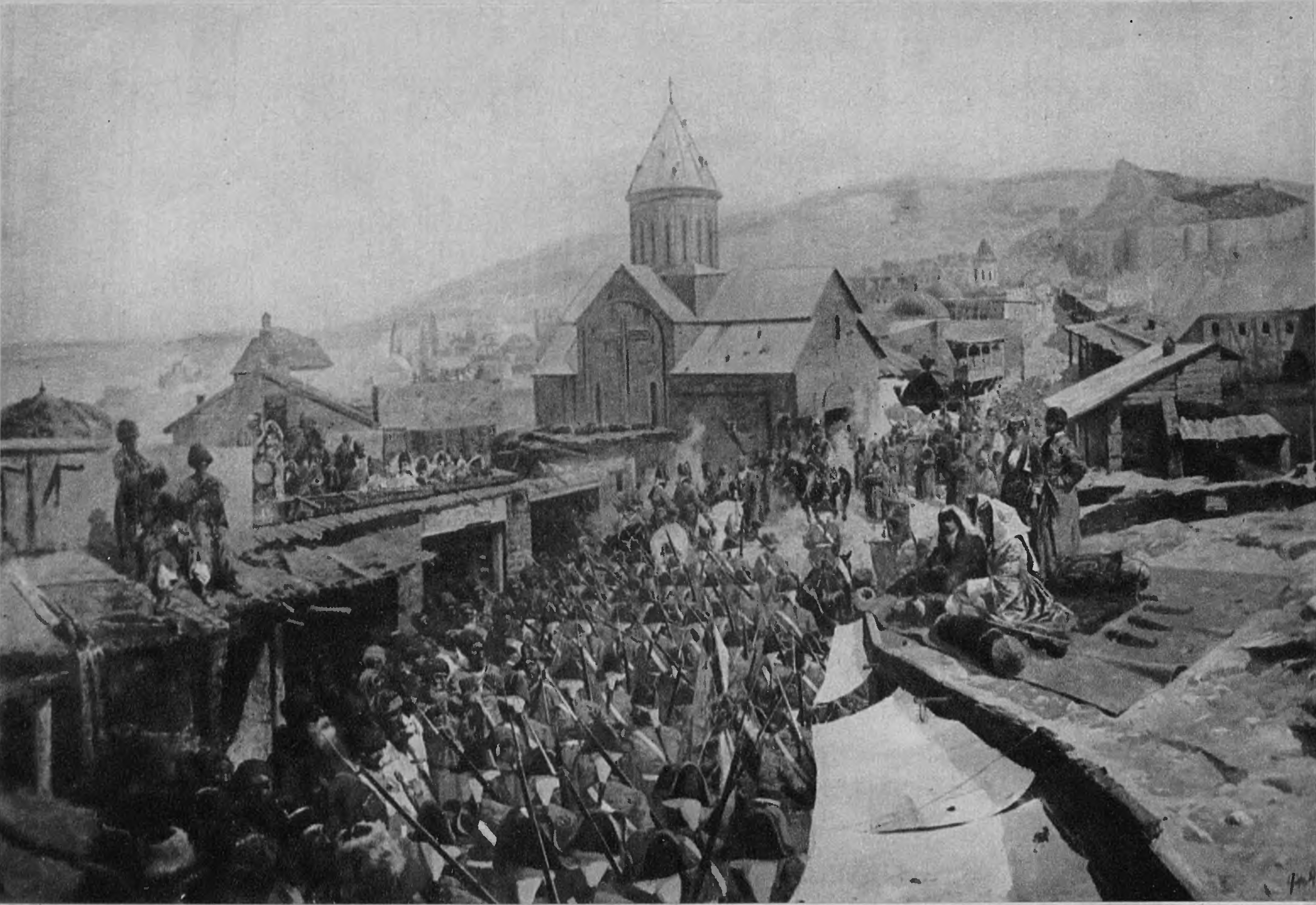
Major General Lazarev introduces the Jaeger Regiment to Tbilisi on November 26, 1799.

On 23 February 1798, an imperial rescript was issued ordering the dispatch of the jäger regiment of Major General Ivan Lazarev to Georgia. The regiment was fully equipped and provisioned with new rifles, ammunition, commissariat supplies, baggage trains, and other necessities, and underwent thorough inspection before departure.

On 20 October 1799, Lazarev, accompanied by his regiment, a Cossack detachment, and an artillery team with four guns, as well as two guns assigned to the Georgian troops, set out from Mozdok. The march across the Caucasus Mountains proved extremely difficult due to frost, heavy snowstorms, and the inadequacy of the roads for artillery and wagons. During skirmishes with local mountaineers (either Kists or Ingush), one non-commissioned officer was killed, and another officer died of illness.

The campaign lasted 36 days. On 26 November 1799, the regiment, numbering 885 men, held a parade three versts from Tbilisi, where it was met by King George XII, accompanied by his sons and a large retinue of nobles and clergy. More than 10,000 citizens gathered to witness the arrival of the Russian troops. The regiment formed in line and, to the beat of drums, greeted the king with a loud “Hurrah!”. The crowd, “unable to restrain their emotion, surged forward, embraced the jägers, and greeted them with brotherly kisses.” Later that day, under the peal of church bells and artillery salutes, the regiment entered Tbilisi.

Meanwhile, Shah Fath-Ali of Persia continued to regard Georgia as part of the Persian Empire and planned another assault on Tbilisi. The Russian envoy in Georgia, Privy Councillor P. I. Kovalevsky, sent letters to Tehran, expressing hopes for continued friendship between the two states and citing the Treaty of Georgievsk (1783) as grounds for warning against a Persian invasion. Despite this, Persian forces under the nominal command of Abbas Mirza advanced toward the South Caucasus.

In the Persian camp, located near Kars, appeared the exiled Georgian prince Alexander, brother of King George XII, seeking to resolve his political disputes in Georgia with Persian assistance. On 22 June 1800, envoys from Abbas Mirza arrived in Tbilisi carrying a firman from Shah Fath-Ali. They demanded a private audience with the king, but George refused, instead receiving them in Kovalevsky's residence in the presence of Lazarev and the officers of the jäger regiment. The envoy openly delivered the shah's ultimatum—complete submission of Georgia to Persia—or another invasion of Tbilisi.

As soon as news of this reached St. Petersburg, Lieutenant General Karl Knorring, commander of the Caucasian division, received on 22 July orders to prepare for dispatch to Georgia nine infantry battalions, ten dragoon squadrons, and artillery. Soon afterward, however, it became known that the Persian army, having plundered the Echmiadzin Monastery, had withdrawn beyond the Aras River. At the same time, Kovalensky, in his letter of August 21 to Privy Councillor Sergey Lashkarev, expressed the opinion that there were clearly insufficient Russian troops in Georgia.

It was soon decided to send to Georgia only the musketeer regiment of Major General Vasily Gulyakov, accompanied by a Cossack hundred and four guns. Should circumstances demand it, other Russian troops stationed along the Caucasian Line near Mozdok were kept ready for immediate deployment. On 25 August 1800, Gulyakov departed from Mozdok, and on 23 September arrived in Tbilisi, where his regiment was received with celebrations equal in grandeur to those that had greeted Lazarev's jägers a year earlier.

The presence of Russian forces in Georgia was intended solely for defense against external enemies. Should internal strife arise, an imperial rescript of 29 October (10 November) ordered that the troops be withdrawn immediately to prevent their involvement in civil conflicts.

== Umma Khan's invasion of Georgia ==
=== Umma Khan’s Request for Russian Protection ===
In early August 1800, an envoy from Umma Khan V, Haji Musa, arrived in Mozdok with a petition addressed to Emperor Paul I of Russia. In it, the Avar ruler sought to place his dominion, the Avar Khanate, under the protection of the Russian Empire. In a report dated 3 (15) August, General-Lieutenant Karl Knorring requested permission from the Emperor to send the Avar envoy onward. By rescript of 26 August, Paul I granted approval for the envoy's arrival in Saint Petersburg. It was further decided that, should Umma Khan and his lands enter Russian allegiance, the annual payment of 5,000 rubles, formerly made to him by the Georgian king, would henceforth be provided by the Russian government as a lifetime pension “in reward for his fidelity.”

However, even before this permission reached its destination, at the end of August 1800, Umma Khan had already set his army in motion toward the Georgian border, signaling a turn from diplomacy to military action.

=== The plan to capture Tbilisi ===
A plan of attack on Tbilisi was drawn up, according to which Prince Alexander, with 2 thousand men, was to capture Sagarejo (about 50 versts from Tbilisi). The rest of the army was divided into two groups: one was to go directly to Tbilisi and try to capture it, while the other was to cross the river Kura (on the right bank) and join the troops of Imeretian King Solomon II, along with the opposition brothers of George—Iulon, Vakhtang, and Parnaoz. With their united forces, they were to approach Tbilisi from the west. In case the first group could not take it, they were supposed to do so together with the united forces of the second.

=== Lazarev's correspondence with Umma Khan and Alexander, and the movement of their troops ===
In mid-October, Umma Khan sent a letter to the Georgian prince David, explaining that his "hostile" actions against Georgia were a result of George's failure to pay the tribute owed to him.

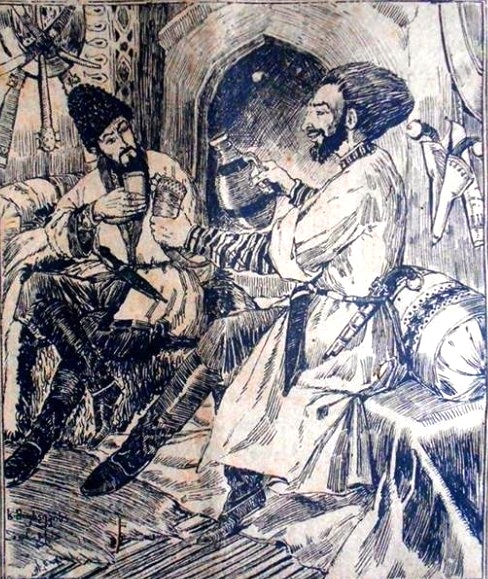
Umma Khan hosting Prince Alexander as imagined by the artist Khalil-Bek Musayasul (1897–1949).

Upon receiving the first reports of Umma Khan's movement, George sent his sons Ioane and Bagrat with 2,000 of the best Georgian troops to the Kakhetian border at Signagi, located 85 kilometers from Tbilisi. There, the princes began assembling a local militia. Lazarev, however, initially downplayed the significance of Umma Khan's advance, believing that the latter was unaware of the retreat of the Persian forces and the arrival of a Jaeger Musketeer Regiment in Tbilisi to reinforce him. But soon, after learning of Umma Khan's plans, Lazarev and Gulyakov, each leading a battalion from his regiment along with a Cossack detachment (1,224 men and 4 guns), set out to confront him on October 28. The remaining forces under Colonel Karyagin stayed behind in Tbilisi to maintain order and safeguard the capital from internal threats. On October 31, Umma Khan crossed to the left bank of the Alazani River at the Urdo ford and positioned his army on the plain near the Top-Karagach tract, about 16 miles from Signagi. The following day, a Russian detachment arrived in Signagi, where Bagrat's forces had already grown to 3,000 Georgian troops, with more militia continuing to join them.

That day, Lazarev sent a letter to Umma Khan urging him to leave Georgia, which was under Russia's protection. He pointed out that the actions of the "high-ranking khan" were not in line with his own request for Russia's patronage, which had already been promised to him by the Emperor. In response, Umma Khan assured Lazarev that he harbored no “hostility” toward Russia, “except for united friendship,” but, having hosted Prince Alexander, he felt it his duty to assist him. Umma Khan also expressed his hope that Alexander would reconcile with his elder brother George. Following this, Lazarev urged Alexander to return to Tbilisi and reconcile with his brother, offering his full cooperation to facilitate the process. However, Alexander remained steadfast in his position.

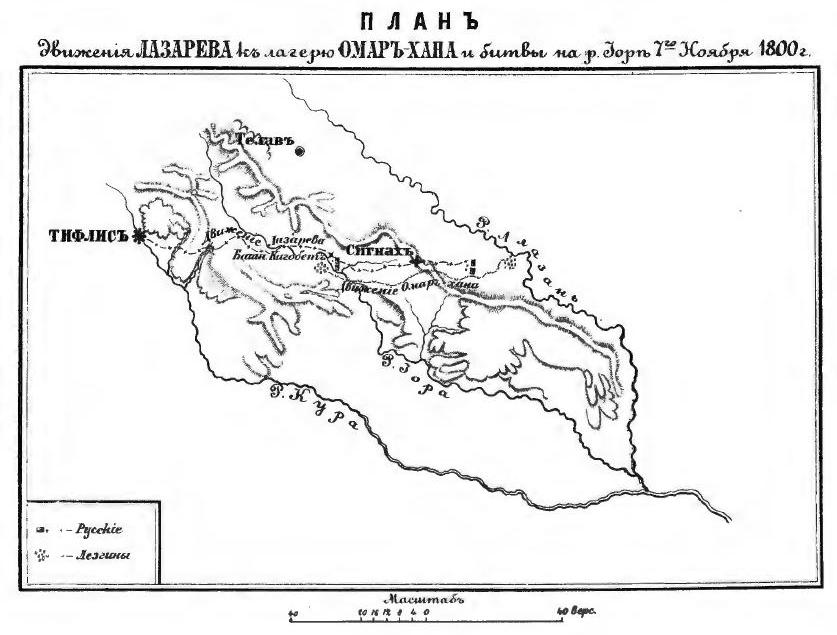
Map of the campaign.

On 4 November, the Russian-Georgian army advanced and, upon reaching the village of Prasiani, set up camp. The following day, Lazarev decided to attack the enemy and approached within 6 versts. Before the assault, he once again appealed to Umma Khan, demanding that he leave Georgia within twenty-four hours to avoid bloodshed. A parliamentarian (Captain Kalantarov of Georgian service) was sent with the message, ordered to return with a response in no more than three hours, but he was detained in Umma Khan's camp. Meanwhile, Umma Khan, having instructed his troops to avoid direct confrontation with the Russian detachment, bypassed his camp on the night of 6 November and moved toward Sagarejo. In the morning, with no definite results, the parliamentarian returned,and Georgian mounted pickets reported the movement of the Highlanders. The Russo-Georgian army immediately broke camp and moved in the opposite direction along their previous path, parallel to Umma Khan's army, with the aim of attacking his flank and forcing him into battle. To navigate the difficult terrain, the transport, arranged in a Wagenburg formation and protected by 100 huntsmen and musketeers with 2 officers, was left near Prasiani. By evening, the Russo-Georgian army reached a long valley and camped in a convenient location with a water source, while Umma Khan's army settled along the edge of the forest near the village of Kakabeti, on the right bank of the Iori River.

== Place of battle ==
The battlefield was an open plain. To the south of it flowed the Iori River, and to the west ran a ditch. To the north of the plain were low mountains extending to Telavi, and to the east were mountain streams flowing from the Telavi heights into the Iori. The very area where the battle took place is called Niakhura.

== Strength ==
=== Russians and Georgians ===
==== Russians ====
The total strength of the Russian detachment that came out on 28 October to meet Umma Khan's army was 1,224 men (including 129 non-combatants) with 4 guns.

Some sources round up the number of the Russian detachment to 1,200 men.

Of the total number, 102 men (10 men from each Jaeger and musketeer company, with 2 officers) were left to guard the convoy in Prasiani and did not take part in the battle.

==== Georgians ====
The exact size of the Georgian forces remains unknown. In different sources, it varies from 3,000 to 10,000 men. It is known that by November 2, Prince Bagrat had up to 3,000 men on foot and horseback. Later, both Princes Bagrat and Ioane had 4,000 men. The Georgian army was subsequently replenished with hastily gathered militia, which, by the time of the battle, could have reached up to 10,000 men.

However, the significant number of Georgian militiamen did not provide a corresponding advantage, as most of them lacked not only firearms but also effective edged weapons. They had two rifles for every 10 men, and the rest were armed with "whatever they could get their hands on," most of whom had only charred dogwood "sticks". The Georgian army also had 2 guns.

=== Dagestani-Georgian ===
The exact number of Umma Khan's troops at the time of the battle (or those who took part in the battle) remains unknown, and in different sources, it varies from 15,000 to 20,000 men. This is primarily due to the fact that his army was not concentrated in one place but, lacking provisions and forage, was usually scattered in search of them, while also being systematically replenished.

It is known that, together with Umma Khan, the opposition prince Alexander (brother of George XII) took part in the campaign with 2,000 Georgian cavalry. Ali-Sultan of Mehtuli, his brother Haji-Ahmed-khan of Dzhengutay, Musa-Haji of Aksay, Qadi of Tabasaran Kazi-Mulla, the son of Surkhay II of Gazikumukh, and other Dagestani rulers joined Umma Khan (under his command).

==== From primary sources ====
On 1 November, Major-General Lazarev, in his report to Lieutenant-General Knorring, stated that the number of Umma Khan's troops "according to rumours" ranged from 7,000 to 8,000 men. The day after the battle (i.e., 8 November), Lazarev wrote that "according to the latest rumours," the army of Umma Khan had grown to 12,000. In a detailed report on 14 November, he reported that the total number of troops of Umma Khan and his allies was "...at the last count, between 10,000 and 15,000".

On November 17, George XII wrote to Emperor Paul that Umma Khan had invaded their possessions with a 20,000-strong army.

Mirza Adigozal bey, who was in Tbilisi at the time, also reported that Umma Khan had an army of 20,000.

==== Later research ====
Troop Strengths According to Different Sources
Source	Year	Strength
Zubov, Platon Pavlovich	1835	18,000 Dagestanis and 2,000 Georgians
Kavkazskiy kalendar	1851	20,000
Military Encyclopaedic Lexicon	1854	Up to 18,000
Butkov, Pyotr Grigorievich	1869	Up to 15,000 (at Alazani)
Shabanov, Dmitry Fedorovich	1871, 1875	15,000
Dubrovin, Nikolay Fedorovich	1886	15,000 (in Qarağac)
Sokhanskaya	1871	20,000
Vasily Potto	1887	20,000 (approaching the border), 15,000 (participating in the battle)
Encyclopaedia of Military and Naval Science	1888	Up to 15,000 (mostly cavalry)
Oliver Wardrop	1888	12,000
Latsinsky, Alexander Semyonovich	1891	Up to 20,000
Bobrovsky, Pavel Osipovich	1893, 1901	15,000 (1 November, at Qarağac), 20,000 (invaded, citing George XII)

== Battle ==
=== Troop convergence ===
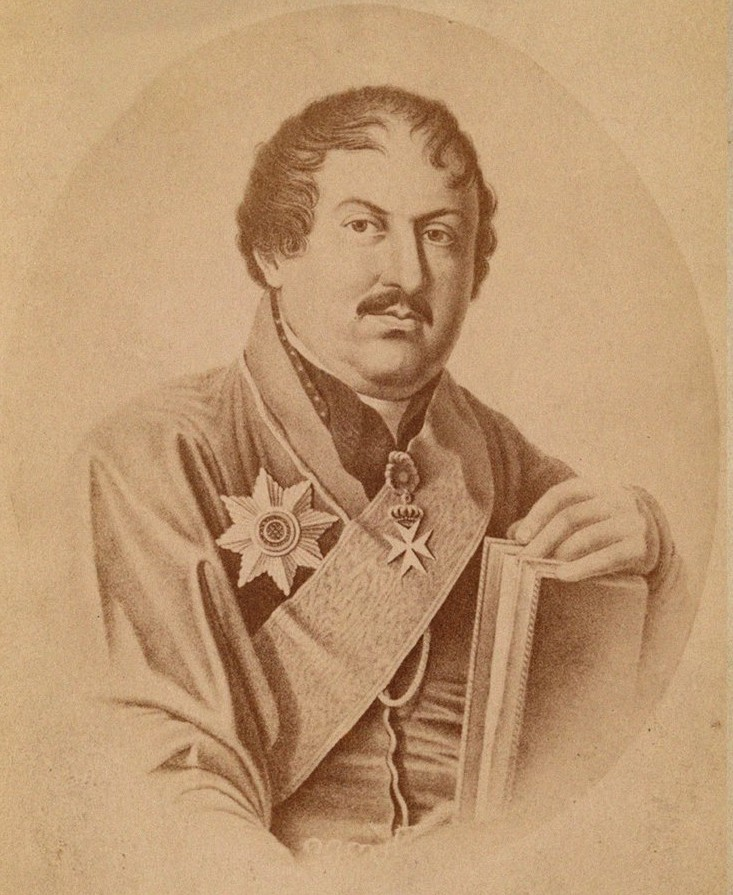
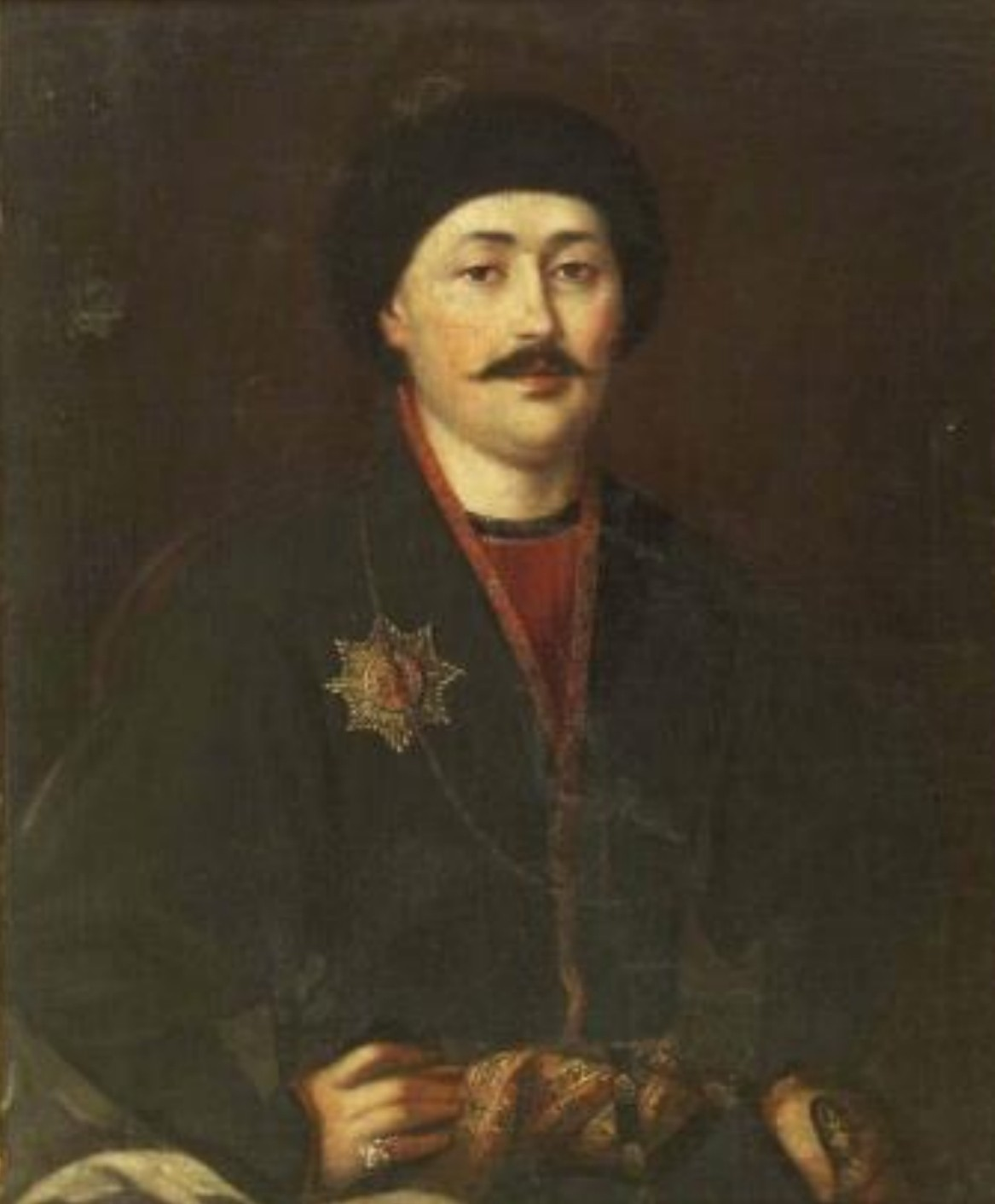
Prince Ioane and Prince Bagrat led the Georgian army during the battle.

On 7 November, three hours before dawn, the Russian-Georgian army left the bivouac and, after a forced march of 15 miles, stopped for a short rest. After continuing its movement, the army reached the open steppe on the left side of the Iori River, where the army of Umma Khan was visible, marching on the opposite side of the river. Within 2 hours, both armies were marching parallel to each other, approaching to within 2 versts. Upon reaching the village of Kakabeti, Umma Khan's army settled along the forest for a bivouac. Part of his cavalry dispersed to occupy the neighboring villages to extract provisions and forage.

Meanwhile, both Russian battalions, in two columns, turned off the road towards the Iori River and, accelerating their pace, moved towards the enemy. The right column (flank) consisted of a battalion from Lazarev's Yeager Regiment, while the left column was made up of a battalion from Guliakov's Musketeer Regiment. In the center, behind the two Russian columns, were the Georgian infantry and cavalry of princes Ioane and Bagrat (with cavalry in front and poorly armed militia behind). Each of the three columns had two guns.

=== Military council and attack by Dagestani highlanders ===
There is an opinion that the Georgian cavalry, which opened fire on them from the left bank of the Iori River, provoked the attack by the mountaineers (despite Umma Khan's ban). General Lazarev also mentioned in his report the task of the Georgian mounted pickets, who were following the Dagestanis, to force them into battle: "Some of the Georgian selected riders, catching up with the enemy horsemen who were not staying behind, cut off their heads, trying to drive them back; but they were unsuccessful in this, as the enemy was rushing forward very hastily". Haydarbek Genichutlinsky also wrote that the Dagestani troops entered the battle of their own accord.

The nobleman Turmanidze, who was with Prince Alexander in the camp of Umma Khan at that time, later testified during interrogation that at the military council it was decided to postpone the attack until the morning and begin it at dawn. However, all the ordinary highlanders, according to Turmanidze, "cried out to attack at the same hour, which they did".

According to Mirza Adigozal bey, at that council "some Lezgin commanders said that the evil of the morning is better than the good of the evening, it is better to begin the battle in the morning," but Umma Khan and other commanders insisted on attacking the enemy "immediately". Immediately after this, Umma Khan ordered part of his army to surround the general's soldiers from four sides, like a ring stone, and, having taken them all prisoner, return to him. The Dagestani troops, in fulfillment of their commander's order, rushed into battle.

=== Battle ===
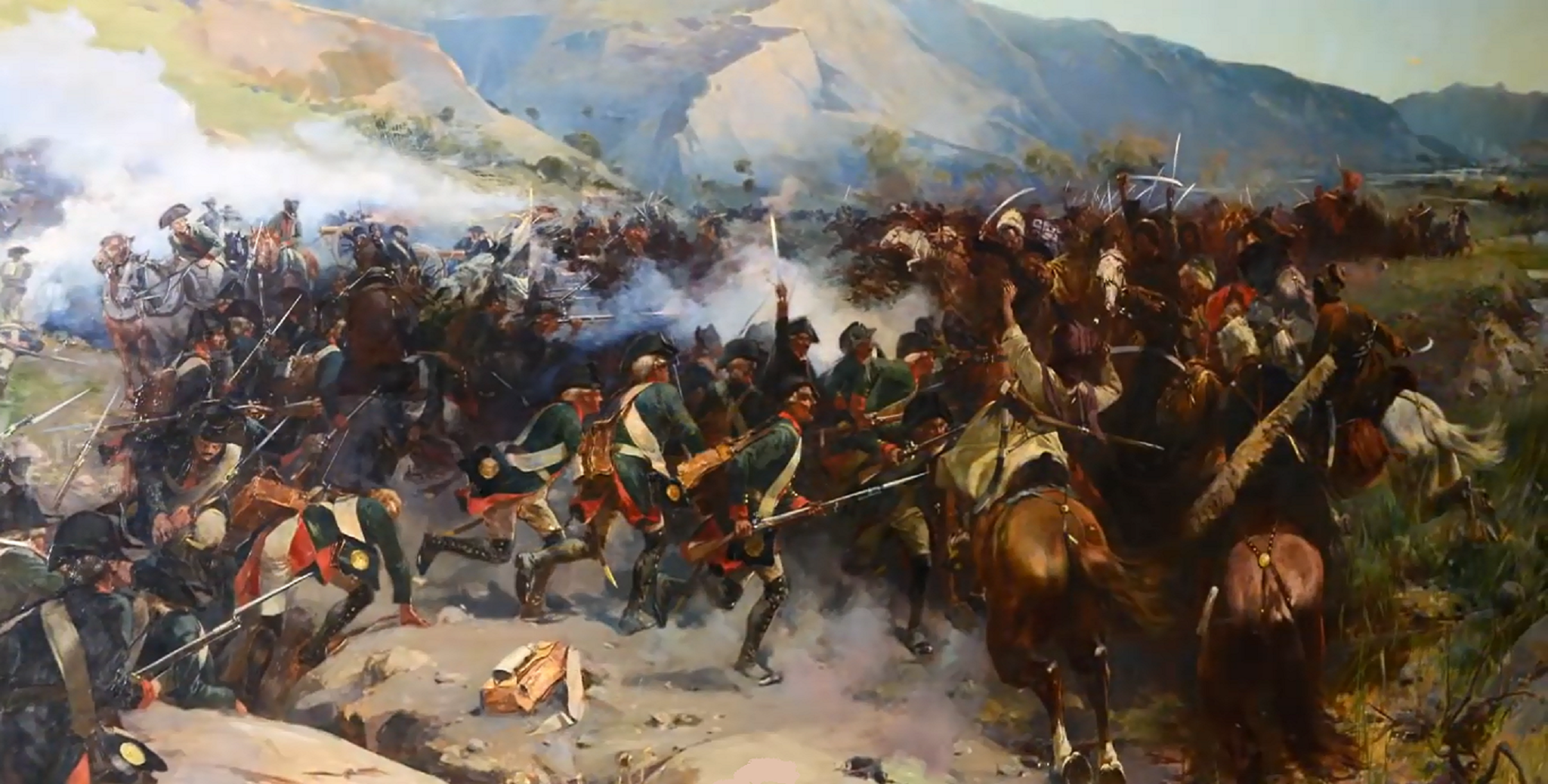
The battle of Niakhura by Nikolay Samokish.

There was a dilapidated tower on the edge of a steep hillside along which Guliakov's column was marching, and a Lezgin who had lodged in it killed a private musketeer with a signal shot. The two Russian battalions immediately formed a formation and continued their movement towards the river in battle formation. In the meantime, the mountaineers began to hastily gather at the bank of the Iori. Their separate detachments, sent to occupy the neighboring villages, began to gather there as well. After assembling, the Dagestani cavalry swiftly crossed to the left bank to attack the enemy.

The Russian artillery fired a volley, but according to Lazarev's report, "the first receptions, although they caused quite a lot of concern for the enemy's ears, did not produce any noticeable change in him, probably because they had not yet reached their crowd". The Dagestani cavalry, having crossed to the left bank, attacked on both sides of the Jaeger battalion. From its position, they opened shtutzer (rifle) and cartridge (artillery) fire on the enemy. The latter, having suffered the first casualties, broke away from it and immediately rushed at the Georgian column. However, even here the Dagestani cavalry was met: from the front by cartridge fire from Georgian guns and from the flank by cartridge and running rifle fire from the Jaeger battalion. Having failed again, part of Umma Khan's cavalry bypassed the enemy columns and began to gather near a dilapidated tower in the rear of the latter, from which a musketeer had been killed by a signal shot before the battle began.

A part of the Dagestani infantry, which had crossed to the left bank of the Iori by that time, also rushed at the cavalry of the Jaeger battalion, opening rifle fire at it from a long distance. However, the mountaineers' firing from smoothbore rifles at that distance was not effective and did not actually cause any harm to the Jaegers. At the same time, the volley fire from the Jaegers' rifled rifles inflicted considerable damage on their infantry in killed and wounded, after which they were driven into disorderly flight.

In the words of Mirza Adigozal bey: "The clothes of the Russian soldiers were dyed scarlet by the blood of Dagestani warriors. They could not resist the Russians. Their legs stopped serving them. The Lezgins, unable to withstand the onslaught, turned to flight.

Meanwhile, Lazarev's cavalry fired a volley of artillery at the Dagestani cavalry assembled near the dilapidated tower, causing some confusion among the former, who began to move 'back and forth without any purpose'. Umma Khan, who was there, still managed to organize his mounted army and led it to strike at the rear of the Georgian column, attacking its left flank where the Georgian militia on foot, mostly without firearms, was located. With a swift attack, the Dagestani cavalry overturned the Georgian infantry and sent it into flight. The musketeer battalion, which had been adjoining the left flank of the Georgian column, was by that time already close to the Iori River, reaching it ‘no more than 50 paces’. Seeing Umma Khan's cavalry rushing toward the Georgian militia, Guliakov immediately turned his battalion and, crossing the ditch, charged against the enemy. After his battalion fired a volley, the Dagestani cavalry broke away from the Georgian infantry. The final blow to Umma Khan's army was dealt by the Georgian cavalry under Prince Ioane, sending it into disorderly flight.

Unable to pass Lazarev's Jaeger square on the way back, the Dagestani cavalry was once again subjected to artillery and rifle fire, suffering additional losses. Umma Khan and his commanders made every attempt to prevent their warriors from fleeing and to continue the attack on the enemy, but they were unsuccessful. The highlanders hurried to seek shelter in the nearest gorges. The Georgian cavalry pursued the retreating enemy for some distance, ruthlessly exterminating even the wounded. As darkness fell, Lazarev ordered the drummers to beat the retreat, and from both squares, a triumphant "Hurray!" was heard.

=== Narrative by Haydarbek Genichutlinsky ===
Based on oral and written sources of local origin, the Avar scholar and theologian Haydarbek Genichutlinsky provided a slightly different account of the battle. According to him:

The Muslim troops, who had entered the battle without the permission of their lord, Umma Khan, and his vizier, Aliskandar Bey, launched an attack. The Russian forces began to retreat rapidly. These infidels, among whom many were already dead by that point, found themselves in an extremely difficult and hopeless situation. The retreating Russians were blocked by Dagestani warriors and a detachment of Georgian cavalry. Realizing they had nowhere left to flee and convinced that inevitable destruction awaited them, the Russians took shelter in a defensible position and resolved to fight as long as they had strength and opportunity. It was then that they fought with the ferocity of lions. As a result, the Muslim troops were defeated.

— Haydarbek Genichutlinsky,

== Casualties ==
=== Russians-Georgians ===
==== Russians ====
Casualties on the Russian side were insignificant, with 3 men.

In the Jaeger Regiment: 1 officer concussed in the leg.

In the Musketeer Regiment: 1 private killed, 1 private lightly wounded, In addition, 7 hoisting and artillery horses were wounded.

According to Haydarbek Genichutlinsky (second half of the 19th century), the Russians had "a lot of killed."

==== Georgians ====
George XII wrote in his letter to Karl Knorring that, except for 1 Russian soldier and 12 Georgians (mountain residents), there were no dead. Butkov reported that the casualties of the Georgian troops remained unknown.

=== Dagestan-Georgians ===
The casualties of the Highlanders, according to different estimates, ranged from 1,500 to 2,000 killed or wounded. The day after the battle (8 November), Lazarev, in his report to Knorring, stated that the enemy left up to 1,500 killed on the battlefield alone. In a more detailed report dated 14 November, Lazarev noted:

According to the latest estimate, it turned out that the enemy suffered up to two thousand killed alone; further along the route the enemy fled, many more bodies of the dead from wounds were found.

— Report of General Lazarev to General Knorring, 14 November 1800,

The Tiflisskie Vedomosti (1828) reported

the Lezgins suffered a terrible defeat, with one and a half thousand men killed and wounded found at the battle site, and up to five hundred bodies lined the route along which the defeated enemy fled.

— Tiflisskie Vedomosti, 1828,

Four people were taken prisoner, and they were captured only the day after the battle. The small number of prisoners relative to the number of dead can be explained by the fact that the Georgians showed no mercy, even to the wounded, during the battle.

Umma Khan himself was severely wounded in the thigh during the battle, "so that the wound extended to the stomach". Prince Alexander was also wounded. Additionally, "three heads of prominent Dagestani elders, including certain Iskander and a 'bogatyr' from Dzhengutay, were thrown at the feet of the Russian commander by the Georgians." According to Haydarbek Genichutlinsky, the battle also claimed the life of the well-known commander Gushu of Khunzakh.

Eleven banners were captured: one by a lieutenant of a musketeer regiment, and ten either captured or picked up by the Georgians.

== Awards ==
Emperor Paul presented Major-General Gulyakov's Musketeer Regiment with Maltese banners, inscribed: "For the capture of the banner from the Avar troops at the Iori River on November 7, 1800".

Generals Lazarev and Gulyakov, Princes Ioane and Bagrat, as well as six other officers, were granted the Commander's Cross of the Order of Saint John of Jerusalem. Twenty-one officers were awarded the Cavalier's Cross, and four were awarded the Donat of the same order. All the lower ranks who took part in the battle received a silver rouble per man.

== Consequences ==
On November 12, the Russian-Georgian army returned to Tbilisi. George XII, accompanied by clergy and notables, met the ‘victors’ a few miles outside the capital. Dismounting from his richly decorated horse, he urged them to give it as a gift to Lazarev and proceeded to head for Tbilisi on foot. Lazarev's entry into the city, in the words of Shabanov, "had the appearance of a triumphal procession".

After his defeat on the Iori River, Umma Khan retreated to Jar and then further to Balakan, while Prince Alexander went to Shusha. Upon learning of this, Lazarev, fearing that Umma Khan, together with Jar-Balakans, might attempt another raid, sent three companies of huntsmen with a cannon to the Signagi citadel and stationed a company of musketeers with a cannon 15 versts away on the road to Tbilisi. They also set up a flying post to ensure the timely transmission of messages. However, Umma Khan's army dispersed, with soldiers returning to their homes or searching for food in different villages. Initially, Umma Khan did plan to launch a renewed raid on Georgia with new forces (including Jar-Balakans), after first taking an army and cannons from Javad Khan of Ganja. However, Javad Khan's forces defeated a detachment of mountaineers sent to gather food, capturing 104 enemy heads and 30 prisoners, with the rest fleeing. Furthermore, Mostafa Khan of Shirvan and Muhammad Hasan of Shaki joined in opposing Umma Khan, aligning with Javad Khan. The latter also urged George XII to join their coalition, proposing that their combined forces should encircle and finally defeat the enemy, so that "none of the Lezgins would dare to come here" afterward. Given these circumstances, a renewed invasion of Georgia by Umma Khan was no longer considered a viable option.

The defeat of Umma Khan made a strong impression on Fath-Ali Shah Qajar, who soon afterwards withdrew Persian troops from the Caucasus. The Consul General in Persia, Skibinevsky, reported to Knorring that, upon learning of the Russian victory in Georgia over Umma Khan, Fath-Ali Shah abandoned his plans to march there and instead turned his attention to Khorasan.

Discord and intrigue among the Bagrations (pretenders to the throne) continued, and George XII realized that the only way to save Georgia was to annex it to Russia. According to a report by Count Apollo Mussin-Pushkin, "the first princes and nobles of Georgia" shared with him the view that Georgia would not be able to survive much longer under the rule of the "now reigning family." They believed that if Georgia lost the hope of coming under Russia's protection, it would undoubtedly fall under the dominion of either the Persians or the Turks, or be destroyed by predatory highlanders.

On 22 December 1800, a manifesto was signed in St. Petersburg announcing the accession of Georgia to Russia. On 28 December 1800, George XII, the last king of Georgia, passed away.

== Significance ==
The consequence of the victory at Niakhura was Russia's acquisition of immense popularity in Georgia, the demonstration of its military power in the Caucasus region, and the importance of its patronage. These factors were particularly significant for the Russian units in Transcaucasia, which, due to their small numbers, found it extremely difficult to maintain a presence there.

Also, as noted in several sources, that battle was not remarkable for its ferocity, as the Russian losses were insignificant, but rather for the determination of the Russian commanders, who, with a small detachment, dared to oppose "a huge crowd of Lezgins, famous for their extraordinary bravery". Mirza Adigozal bey wrote the following about this:

Then I myself was in Dar-us-sururur [Tbilisi]. <...> The faith of the population of Gurjistan [Georgia] and other people in the courage and valor of the victorious Russian troops greatly increased, for it was one of the rare and difficult cases. After this, the glory and valor of the general and his victorious troops were on the lips of the people. Indeed, the fame of the general's inexpressible bravery spread throughout the Caucasus. The pen is unable to describe such bravery

— Mirza Adigozal bey,

On the whole, thanks to the arrival of the Yeager regiment in Georgia, followed by the musketeer regiment, in 1800, three major dangers were avoided: feuds, invasions by Persian troops, and attacks by the mountaineers of Dagestan. It is also believed that with the arrival of the Yeager Regiment in Georgia, Russia began to establish itself firmly in Transcaucasia. According to Bobrovsky, "the first impressive impetus to this was the Iorskaya victory." A number of researchers argue that a new period in the history of the Caucasus began at that time.

== Legacy ==
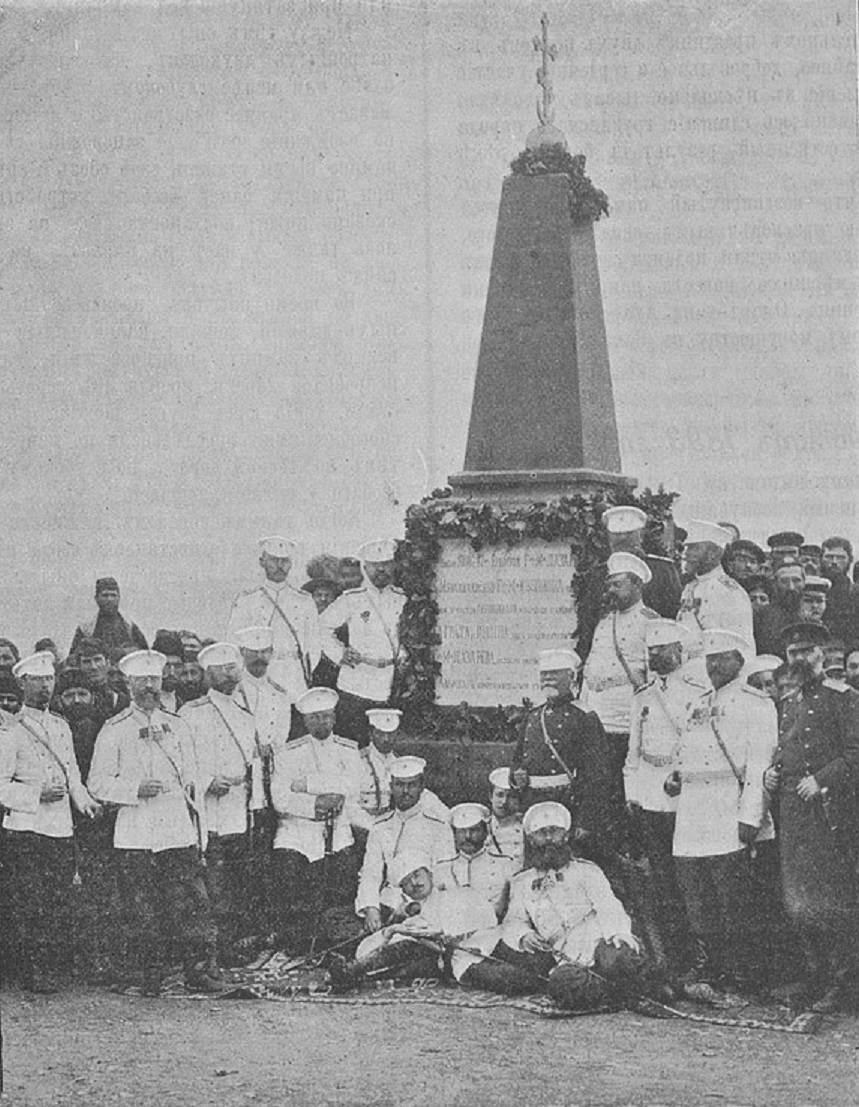
A monument in honour of the Battle of Iori river.

In 1901, a monument in honour of the battle was erected on one of the hills on the plain near the Iori River and the village of Kakabeti on the initiative of officers of the Erivan and Kabarda regiments. The commander of the Caucasus Military District, General Grigory Golitsyn, having learnt about this project, not only approved but also provided great financial support. The consecration of the monument took place on 1 October 1901.

== See also ==
- Georgia within the Russian Empire
- Lekianoba

== Sources ==
- Berzhe, A.P. (1866). Официальные документы, собранные Кавказской археографической комиссией [Official documents collected by the Caucasus Archeological Commission] (in Russian). Tbilisi.
- Berge, Adolf; Kobyakov, Dmitry (1866). Acts collected by the Caucasian Archaeographic Commission (in Russian). Main Directorate of the Viceroy of the Caucasus.
- Adigozal, Mirza (1950). Garabaghname. Azerbaijan National Academy of Sciences.
- Dubrovyn, N.T. (1867). Георгий XII, последний царь грузии [George XII, Last King of Georgia] (in Russian). Saint Petersburg.
- Bobrovsky, Pavel (1893). История 13-го Лейб-Гренадерского Эриванского Его Величества полка за 250 лет [The history of the 13th Life Guards Erivan Regiment of His Majesty for 250th anniversary] (in Russian). Vol. 3. Saint Petersburg: Typography of S. Balashev. ISBN 978-5-458-25103-7.
- Bobrovsky, Pavel (1901). On the centenary of the annexation of Georgia to Russia, September 12, 1801. The sad state of Georgia under King George XII. Battle of the Iora River near Kagobet November 7 (19), 1801. Kavkazskiy Vestnik.
- Butkov, P.G. (1869). Материалы для современной истории Кавказа, 1722–1803 [Materials for the Modern History of the Caucasus, 1722–1803] (in Russian). Saint Petersburg.
- Dubrovin, Nikolai (1886). История войны и владычества русских на Кавказе [The history of the war and domination of Russians in the Caucasus] (in Russian). Saint Petersburg.
- Dubrovin, Nikolay (1897). George XII, the last king of Georgia and its annexation to Russia. Saint Petersburg: Chichinadze.
- Kaffka (1902). Consecration of the monument on the Iori River.
- Khabalov, Sergey (1888). Iora. Encyclopedia of Military and Naval Sciences.
- Kortua, N. M. (1989). Русско-грузинские взаимоотношения во второй половине XVIII века [Russian-Georgian relations in the second half of the 18th century] (in Russian). Tbilisi: Tbilisi University. ISBN 5-511-00242-9.
- Popov, Konstantin (1931). Temple of Glory: in 2 parts. Paris: Renaissance.
- Genichutlinsky, Hayderbek (1992). Историко-биографические и исторические очерки [Historical, biographical and historical essays] (in Russian) (Dagestan Scientific Center of the Russian Academy of Sciences ed.). Makhachkala – via Translated from Arabic by Aitberov.
- Potto, Vasily; Tomkeev, Vladimir; Veidenbaum, Evgeniy (1899). Historical sketch of the Caucasian wars (in Russian). Chancellor Chief citizen partly in the Caucasus.
- Potto, V. A., ed. (1906). Памятник на реке Иоре [Monument on the river Iore]. Памятники времён утверждения русского владычества на Кавказе [Monuments of the time of the establishment of Russian rule in the Caucasus] (PDF) (in Russian). Vol. 1. Tbilisi: Caucasus Military District Headquarters. pp. 79–86.
- Potto, Vasily Aleksandrovich (1887). Кавказская война въ отдѣльныхъ очеркахъ, эпизодахъ, легендахъ и біографіяхъ ... Изданіе второе. том. 1. вып. 2, 3. том. 2-4 [The Caucasian War in individual essays, episodes, legends and biographies ... Second edition. Vol. 1. Issue 2, 3. Vol. 2-4] (in Russian). OCLC 1152610991.
- Rayfield, Donald (2012). Edge of Empires: A History of Georgia. London: Reaktion Books. ISBN 978-1-299-19101-3. OCLC 829059436.
- Shabanov, D. F. (1871). History of His Majesty's 13th Life Grenadier Erivan Regiment. Vol. 1. Tiflis: District headquarters of the Caucasian military district.
- Sokol, K. G. (2006). Монументальные памятники Российской империи: каталог [Monumental memorials of the Russian Empire: catalog] (in Russian). Vagrius Plus.
- Vateishvili, Juansher (1973). Russian social thought and press in the Caucasus in the first third of the 19th century. Nanuka.
- Служба Ширванца: 1726—1909 г. [Service of Shirvanets: 1726-1909] (PDF) (in Russian). Tbilisi: С. Быхова. 1910. Archived from the original (PDF) on 5 March 2016.
