= Battle of Kurekdere =

1854 battle of the Crimean War

Battle of Kürekdere
- Part of The Crimean War
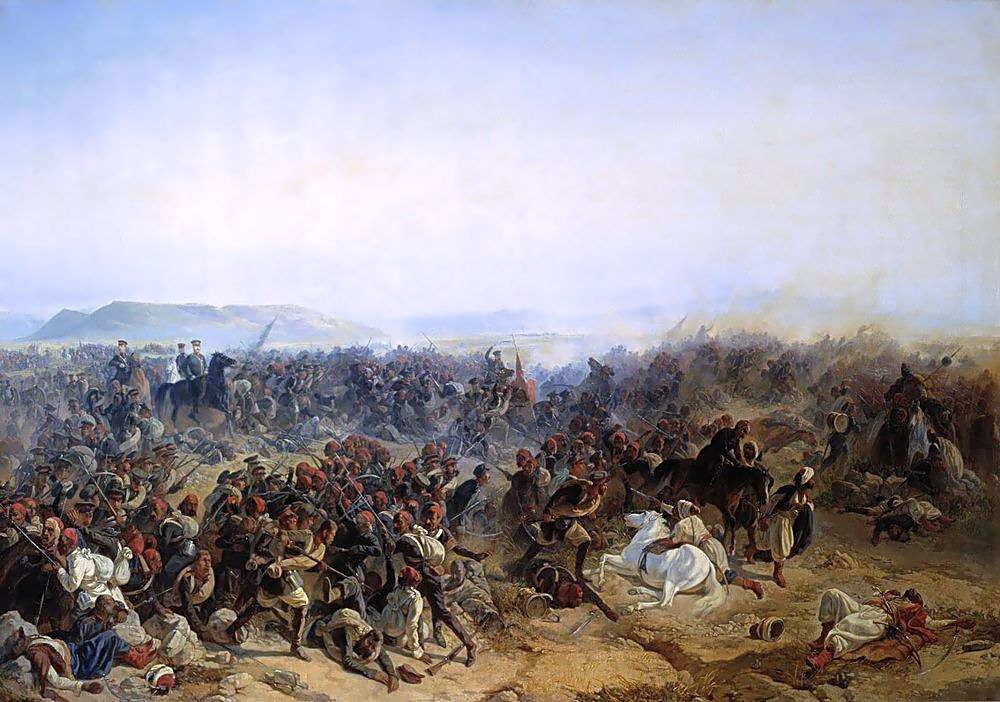
- Battle of Kurekdere by Fedor Baikov
Date	6 August 1854
Location	Kürekdere Trans-Caucasus 40°43′05.40″N 43°29′54.35″E
Result	Russian victory

Belligerents
Ottoman Empire	(Russia) Russian Empire

Commanders and leaders
Zarif Mustafa Pasha; Hurshid Pasha; Baba Kerim Pasha; Feyzi Pasha; Ferik Veli Pasha; Ferik Rashid Pasha; Ismail Pasha; Mirliva Hasan Pasha; Nassim Bey	(Russian Empire) Vasili Bebutov

Strength
35,000–40,000; 78 guns	20,000–29,800; 64 guns

Casualties and losses
1,200–2,820 killed 1,000–2,000 wounded 2,000 captured 6,000 deserters	589 killed 2,000–2,500 wounded

The Battle of Kürekdere took place on 6 August 1854 as part of the Crimean War. The battle occurred when an Ottoman army from the Ottoman fortress of Kars marched out to confront a marauding Russian detachment near the village of Kürekdere in the Trans-Caucasus.

== Background ==
On 2 December 1853, after the defeat at the Battle of Başgedikler, the beaten and demoralized Anatolian army fell back to the Turkish fortress of Kars. In January 1854, after the defeat at Başgedikler was blamed on Abdi Pasha, Ahmed Pasha was appointed mushir or field-marshal of the Anatolian army. During the winter of 1853-1854, Abdi Pasha severely neglected the welfare of his conscripted army at Kars and as many as 20,000 men died of malnutrition and disease. As the winter came to an end, Ahmed Pasha was removed as the field marshal and recalled to Istanbul.

In the spring of 1854, the former governor of the province of Erzurum, Zarif Mustafa Pasha, was appointed as the new field-marshal. Although he had attained the rank of Pasha, Zarif Mustafa was not a man with a strong background of military leadership. His early military experience had been as a regimental clerk and later in his military career he served in commissariats. While the army was reinforced with Armenian conscripts under his command, little was done to improve or correct equipment deficiencies. Nevertheless, Zarif Pasha was under great pressure to confront and defeat the Russian forces in the Trans-Caucasus.

== Maneuvers ==
By the summer of 1854, the Anatolian army had been reinforced to the extent that the Turks had numerical superiority over the Russian forces in the southern Caucasus. During this time, Zarif Pasha had numerous opportunities to take the offensive and attack Russian outposts and garrisons; however, he initiated no activity against the Russians even when members of his staff urged him to do so. Because of Zarif Pasha's passive conduct, the Russians felt safe to move about actively and strike the Turks when they had the advantage.

On 1 July, Russian General Bebutov led an expedition of 15,000 men across the Akhuryan River and established an encampment near the village of Kürekdere approximately an hour's march from Turkish outposts at Sobattan and Hadgi-Velikoi. After Zarif Pasha learned of the Russian encroachment, he moved his army from the fortress at Kars to the Turkish outpost at Hadgi-Velikoi and prepared to confront the Russians.

For the month of July the two armies remained in the field but there was no battle. One day the armies formed up ready to fight but withdrew due to a violent thunderstorm. During the period that the two armies were encamped, the Bashi-bazouk Turkish allies conducted several cavalry raids on the Russians, one in which they suffered many casualties because the Turks failed to support them. Many of the Bashi-bazouks ultimately became frustrated with the failure of Zarif Pasha to take action and returned to their homes.

During this time, Zarif Pasha reinforced his army with the infantry division from Ardahan commanded by Kerim Pasha bringing the number of men in the Turkish encampment to approximately 40,000. Russian General Bebutov did the same calling in field detachments increasing the size of his force to approximately 28,000 men. Even as reinforcements arrived and the Turks maintained their numerical superiority, Zarif Pasha remained bewildered as to whether he should attack or maintain a defensive posture.

On 3 August, Zarif Pasha received the disturbing news that on 18 July Russian General Vrangel leading 11,000 troops attacked and defeated Selim Pasha's Turkish force of 8,000 men at Bayezid. Turkish casualties were nearly 2,400 men. The Russians were now en route to the small Turkish garrison at Erzurum and there was concern that the Russian detachment would ultimately be heading north toward Hadgi-Velikoi to attack Zarif Pasha's army from the rear.

== Battle plan ==
It then became apparent that the Turks must take action. Without a plan of his own, Zarif Pasha held a council with his officers to discuss options. There were more than twenty Ottoman pashas and also more than twenty European staff officers, including Richard Guyon, the British-born Hungarian General serving as the chief of staff for the Anatolian army. The relationship between Zarif Pasha and Guyon, however, was very poor. Zarif Pasha did not believe that Guyon knew how to take orders or to command an army. When Guyon made recommendations as he did earlier that summer to attack the Russians at their bases, Zarif Pasha rejected the proposals outright.

At the war council, however, the pashas argued among themselves and could not agree upon what should be done. Reluctantly, Zarif Pasha approved a plan put forward by Guyon to immediately attack Bebutov's army as it was encamped at Kürekdere and then turn and pursue the Russian detachment advancing upon Erzurum. Although Zarif Pasha gave his approval to Guyon's plan on the evening of 3 August, he nevertheless delayed the attack for 48 hours because August 4 and 5 were unlucky days on the Turkish calendar.

Guyon's plan called for the army to set out at sunset taking advantage of the moonlight to travel through the night to a position near the Russian camp and then to attack at dawn. The evening of August 5 was clear and the moon lit up the countryside. The troops were ready to go, but once again Zarif Pasha upset the plans when he failed to understand the importance of the timetable for the movement of the troops and neglected to give the order to march. Even when Guyon urged Zarif Pasha to issue the order, Zarif Pasha reportedly replied “I am the müşir. I know when to set out”. Zarif Pasha refused to be prompted and the Turkish troops were held for over two hours, marching out at approximately midnight.

The night march was then further upset by Zarif Pasha. Both divisions of the Turkish army, the first division commanded by Kerim Pasha and the second division commanded by Vely Pasha, were to march through the night and arrive at the Russian camp simultaneously to attack in a coordinated manner. Zarif Pasha, however, allowed Vely Pasha and the second division to halt their march for a two hour period when they ran into difficulty crossing the terrain in the darkness. As a result, the first division of the Turkish force not only arrived two hours after dawn but also two hours before the second division. All the benefit of an early morning surprise attack with a concentrated force was lost and the Russians were up and in battle formation when the first of the Turks arrived.

== Battle ==
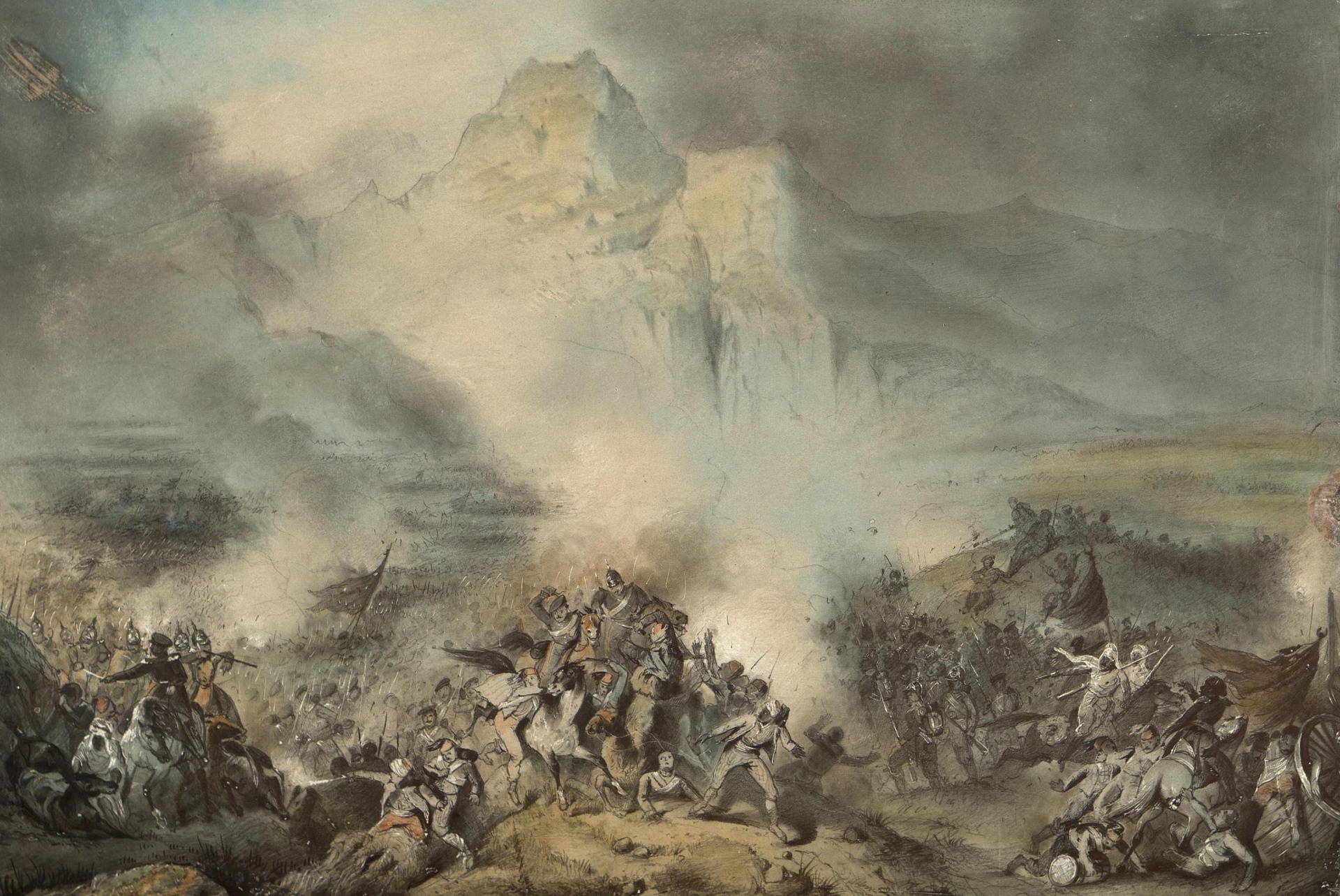
Bogdan Willewalde. Battle of Kurekdere

On Sunday, 6 August 1854, the two armies met at Kürekdere and the battle started by means of a 30 minute exchange of cannon fire. The Turkish artillery was more effective at the outset and drove the Russians off of an elevated hillside.

At the beginning of the fighting on the battlefield, the first division of the Turks was successful at driving back the Russian infantry. The Russian dragoons, however, followed-up and rode into the Turkish infantry at a high speed. This caused the Turkish infantry to panic and retreat leaving their artillery unprotected. In a series of attacks, the dragoons and the Russian infantry then attempted without success to capture the Turkish artillery. During that struggle, the Russian infantry routed a Turkish battalion composed of inexperienced conscripts who quickly broke and fled. Shortly thereafter, the dragoons captured the Turkish artillery and then began an indiscriminant attack upon the Turkish infantry, cavalry, and artillery corps. The entire Turkish force started to break and give way. Efforts by Kerim Pasha to re-form and fight were in vain. About that time, the second division arrived and immediately attacked the Russians by means of a cannonade. The battle began to turn back in the favor of the Turks.

Guyon and Resul Pasha then brought the Turkish cavalry into the fight advancing at a gallop. As the force advanced toward the Russians encampment and crested the top of a hill, they rode headlong into a Russian infantry regiment. When the cavalry reined in, it caused great disorder and confusion which turned into panic and spread to the Bashi-bazouks. Quickly, all the mounted Turkish forces fled back toward their own lines riding into their own infantry and causing such a disruption that the organization and control of the infantry was lost. As a result, the entire Turkish force panicked and fled in confusion.

As the cavalry began to disrupt the infantry, Guyon ordered Vely Pasha and the second division to advance and support the first division. Vely Pasha, however, refused to do so until ordered by Zarif Pasha. When the mushir was located an hour later, the order was then given to Vely Pasha to support the first division, but it was too late. The first division was already retreating pursued by Russian dragoons. Guyon was able to regroup four battalions of infantry, one regiment of cavalry, and one artillery battery, and lead them in a charge. He was successful in regaining some lost ground, but was overcome by the greater number of Russians.

The battle was over. Quickly the Turks fled back to their encampment, gathered what they could and proceeded to retreat in great disorder. Soon there was a caravan of the remnants of an army stretching for miles on the road to Kars. Included among the shattered remains of the army were disorganized units of infantry, cavalry, and artillery; the walking wounded; bullock carts carrying materials and the wounded; baggage carts; horses, mules, and camels; and non-combatants. Although the caravan was an easy target, the Russians did not pursue their beaten enemy.

At the Kars fortress chaos reigned. Bashi-Bazouk riders had ridden back in haste to warn that the Russians were coming. People were collecting their valuables and fleeing the city. Zarif Pasha ultimately brought his defeated army back to Kars and took refuge in the fortress expecting the Russians to attack. The Russians, however, chose not to attack the strongly fortified city at that time.

The defeat of the Anatolian army at Kürekdere can be attributed to the incompetence of Zarif Pasha and the cowardice of the majority of the Turkish officers. The implementation of the battle plan by Zarif Pasha was poor. The Turkish forces were divided into three groups that became widely separated. As a result, the individual Turkish groups fought individually rather than as a group taking advantage of their numerical superiority. The artillery performed well and fought bravely. The performance of the Turkish cavalry was a disgrace as was the conduct of the Bashi-bazouks. The conduct of the Turkish officers in general was shameful as they deserted their men and fled back to their camp to secure their baggage and retreat to Kars.

The Times correspondent, Humphry Sandwith witnessed the battle and wrote:

With a vivid impression of the whole engagement, from the first cannonshot to the last straggling discharges of musketry, I can use no language too strong to express my reprobation of the conduct of nearly four-fifths of the Turkish officers present. In accounting for the defeat of an army numbering nearly 40,000 men of all arms by a hostile force of less than one-half that number, it is not sufficient to say that the management of the whole battle on the side of the Turks was a series of blunders from first to last; strategical errors might have protracted the engagement, and have added to the cost of a victory, but downright cowardice alone – which no generalship could have redeemed – gave the day to the Russians. One arm, and one arm only behaved well – the artillery – which, with its commander, Tahir Pasha, acted worthily of any army in Europe. Of the whole 40 battalions of infantry two regiments – the 5th Anatolian and 4th Desartet – alone stood their ground and resisted cavalry. Three successive times did three squadrons of Russian dragoons bear down upon these exceptionally brave regiments with a force before which many better disciplined troops would have yielded, without effecting an opening in their ranks; and it was only after a fourth charge, supported by the fire of a field-piece, that they gave way, when only 250 of the first and 400 of the second escaped death from the Russian sabres. Than the conduct of the rest of the infantry, nothing could well be worse, except that of the entire cavalry, which would have disgraced the rawest Bashi-Bazouks. If such, however, was the conduct of the men, that, as I have said, of the great majority of the superior officers was still more infamous. An hour after the action began, there was hardly a Bunbashi (major) or Murallai (colonel) to be seen; almost to a man they had deserted their regiments, and fled back to the camp to secure their baggage and send it off to Kars. Battalion upon battalion, and squadron upon squadron, were thus left without leaders – a status quo, among others, which mainly contributed to the general confusion and ultimate defeat.

— Humphry Sandwith, A Narrative of the Siege of Kars (1856)

Guyon attempted to lead the Turks in the battle, however, he was only the chief of staff and had no line authority to command; as such, the commanders of Turkish forces weren't authorized to obey his orders without approval from Zarif Pasha.

== Aftermath ==
The battle of Kürekdere demonstrated again that the Turkish army was incapable of pushing the Russians out of the Trans-Caucasus without the assistance of its allies.

Both Zarif Pasha and Guyon were recalled and put on trial by the Sublime Porte in Istanbul. Zarif Pasha tried to place the blame for the defeat on Guyon. Guyon, however, had many supporters including at least two foreign correspondents; Zarif Pasha's aide-de-camp, Count de Melfray; and Şükrü Pasha of the Turkish army, all who defended the Englishman's battle plan and conduct. Zarif Pasha was accused of corruption in the administration of the Anatolian army and taking offensive action in the battle of Kürekdere when his orders were to only be on the defensive. In July 1855, Zarif Pasha was acquitted and released.

The Ottoman Empire's allies recommended that all foreign officers at Kars be recalled and that the command of the army be entrusted to General Klapka. Eventually in September 1854, İsmail Pasha, the chief of staff of the Rumelian army, was appointed to take the command of the Anatolian army at Kars. There were no further military conflict of a substantial nature between the Ottoman and Russian Empires in the Trans-Caucasus for the remainder of the year.

== General references ==
- Allen, W.E.D.; Muratoff, Paul (2002). Caucasian Battlefields A History of the Wars on the Turco-Caucausian Border 1828-1921. Taylor & Francis Group.
- Duncan, Charles (1855). A Campaign with the Turks in Asia, Volume 2.
