= Avar raids on Georgia (1785) =

Military campaign in the Caucasus

- Part of Lekianoba
- Umma Khan V leading his army from Kunzakh
Date	September – November 1785
Location	Kartli, Kakheti, Imereti, and Lori; Modern day Georgia and Armenia
Result	Avar victory: Devastation of Eastern Georgia and Lori region; Heraclius II of Georgia paid tribute to the Avar Khan

Belligerents
Kingdom of Kartli-Kakheti; Ossetian societies; (Ingushetia) Ingush societies; Supported by: (Russia) Russian Empire	Avar Khanate: Supported by: Ottoman Empire

Commanders and leaders
Heraclius II (Russia) S. D. Burshanev	Umma Khan V

Strength
Unknown	11,000

Casualties and losses
At least 1,500: 640 killed and 860 captured in Aghjakala	Unknown

The Avar raids on Georgia (1785) was a military campaign launched by the Avar Khanate under the leadership of Umma Khan V against the Kingdom of Kartli-Kakheti during the late 18th century. The invasions were one of the most devastating series of conflicts in the raids of Dagestanis to Georgia, also known as Lekianoba. It ended with King Heraclius II accepting a peace agreement under which he agreed to pay annual tribute to Umma Khan.

== History ==
=== Prelude ===
Beginning in the 16th century, highlanders from Dagestan carried out numerous raiding expeditions into Georgia. The raids became especially frequent after the rise to power of Umma Khan, who, in addition to the Georgians, compelled the khans of Derbent, Quba, Baku, Shirvan, and Shaki, as well as the pasha of Akhaltsikhe, to pay him tribute in exchange for sparing their territories from further attacks. The Jaro-Belokani jamaats also acknowledged his authority.

=== The raids ===
In the autumn of 1785, Umma Khan again invaded the Georgian plain with his Avar forces. According to Russian sources, he reached the Alazani River on 16 September. King Heraclius II assembled his own army and called upon Ossetian and Ingush auxiliaries. A Russian detachment under Stepan Burnashev also joined the Georgian forces.

Umma Khan rapidly crossed the Karayaz Steppe and captured the fortress of Aghjakala in Borchaly. Georgian losses reportedly amounted to 640 killed and 860 captured. The Avar army subsequently devastated the Akhtala mines and copper smelting works before advancing into Lori, where the region was plundered. In late October or early November, Umma Khan raided Upper Imereti, capturing and destroying the fortress of Vakhan. Contemporary accounts state that approximately 700 inhabitants were inside the fortress. All adult males were reportedly executed except the noble princes. (Note: These were members of the Imeretian princely house of Abashidze. All were taken prisoner, including two daughters of Prince Evgen Abashidze. According to later accounts, one was presented by Umma Khan to Ibrahim Khalil Khan of Karabakh, whom she subsequently married, while the other became Umma Khan's own wife.) The fortress was burned, after which Umma Khan marched to Akhaltsikhe, where his army spent the winter.

The presence of the Avar army at Akhaltsikhe alarmed Heraclius II, who no longer considered his kingdom secure. Umma Khan began preparing another campaign from Akhalkalaki toward the Tskhinvali Gorge. After learning of these preparations, Heraclius II sought peace. According to historian D. L. Vateishvili, the Georgian king, lacking sufficient military strength, was compelled to accept humiliating peace terms, agreeing to become Umma Khan's tributary. Under the agreement, Heraclius was required to pay an annual tribute of 10,000 silver rubles and ransom prisoners at the rate of 50 rubles per captive.

=== Aftermath ===
In April 1786, Umma Khan departed through the Erivan Khanate to Karabakh, where he joined his ally Ibrahim Khalil Khan. From there he returned to Avaria via Georgia, plundering the Ganja Khanate en route and exacting an indemnity of 5,000 rubles.

In 1788, Umma Khan assembled an army of approximately 20,000 men and once again launched a campaign against Fatali Khan of the Quba Khanate, laying siege to the town of Aghsu. During the campaign, however, the Avar forces advanced too close to the domains of Bammat, the Shamkhal of Tarki, who dispatched an army under the command of his son. The Avar army was decisively defeated by the Shamkhal's forces, forcing Umma Khan to retreat to Karabakh and seek peace with Fatali Khan.
