= Baba Kerim Pasha =

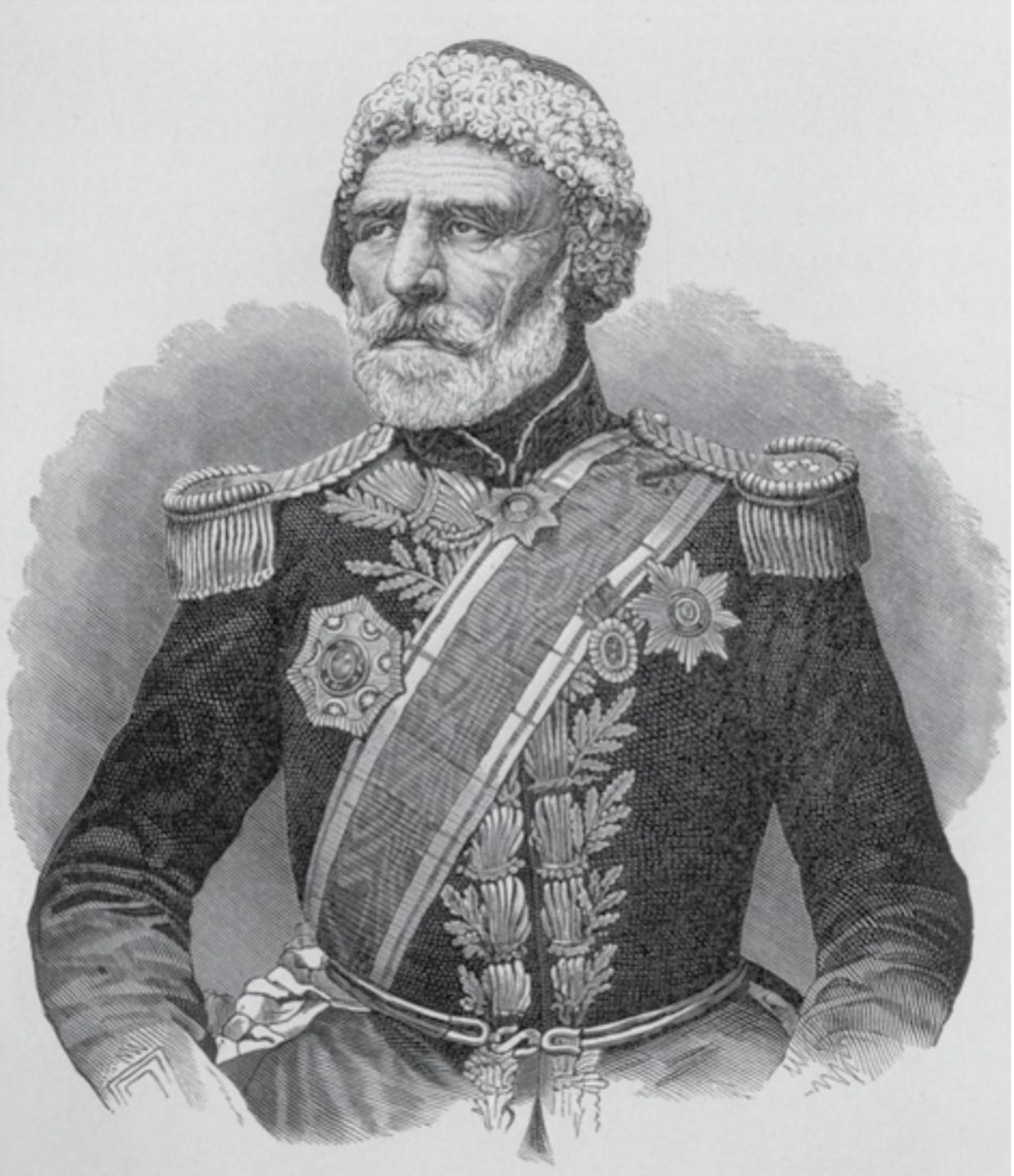
- Lithography of Kerim Pasha by Georg Wilhelm Timm (1855)
- Died: 1863; Ottoman Empire
- Military career
- Allegiance: Ottoman Empire
- Rank: Mushir
- Conflicts: Russo-Turkish War (1828–1829); Crimean War; Battle of Kurekdere; Siege of Kars

Baba Kerim Pasha was an Ottoman Mushir. He is known for his services in the Crimean War.

== Biography ==
Information about Kerim Pasha's early life is limited. He participated in the Russo-Turkish War (1828–1829). Afterwards, he served as a commander in the Arabian Army. With the outbreak of the Crimean War, Kerim Pasha was transferred to the Caucasus front. He had the Hasankale Camp built in Erzurum as a precautionary measure, and was subsequently sent to Kars. Due to the love and trust his soldiers had in him, he began to be known by the nickname "Baba Kerim" (Father Kerim).

During the Battle of Kurekdere, he commanded the First Division, which formed the right flank of the Ottoman army, together with Feyzi Bey. Shortly afterwards, he was assigned to the defense of Kars Castle. While the siege continued, on September 29, 1855, the Russians launched a full-scale attack against the forts. Although wounded in the chest, he did not leave the fight as the bullet had not penetrated deeply, and he boosted the morale of his soldiers. At the end of the battle, the losses of the Russian army were around 7,500-8,000 (among them Lieutenant General Pyotr Kovalevski), while the losses of the Ottoman army were approximately 1,000 soldiers. Following this success, Kerim Pasha and William Pasha were promoted from brigadier general to marshal. Russian general Modest Bogdanovich described Kerim Pasha as extraordinarily brave and interested in everything, while Russian commander-in-chief Nikolay Muravyov counted him among the best commanders of the volunteer units in Kars.

However, the battle ended on November 28, 1855, with the surrender of the Ottoman army due to starvation and the inability of reinforcements to reach them.

Following the surrender of Kars, Kerim Pasha, along with other commanders, was taken prisoner by General Muravyov and held in captivity in Russia for a time. He was released after the signing of the Treaty of Paris on March 30, 1856, and returned to the Ottoman Empire. He died in 1863.

== Sources ==
- Valehoğlu, Fahri (2005). Karapapaklar ve Onların XIX. Yüzyıl Savaş Tarihi. Seda Neşriyat. p. 65. ISBN 9785868740329.
- Alexandre, Charles (2018). Kırım Savaşı Öncesinde Osmanlı Ordusu: Organizasyon ve Savaş Gücü. Kronik Kitap. p. 79. ISBN 978-975-2430-69-3.
- Aksun, Ziya Nur (1994). Osmanlı Tarihi. Istanbul: Ötüken Yayınları. ISBN 975-437-145-8.
- Badem, Candan (2010). The Ottoman Crimean War (1853–1856). Leiden: Brill. ISBN 9789004190962. JSTOR 10.1163/j.ctt1w8h1kf. Archived from the original on 9 November 2023.
