= Battle of Başgedikler =

1853 battle of the Crimean War

- Part of The Crimean War
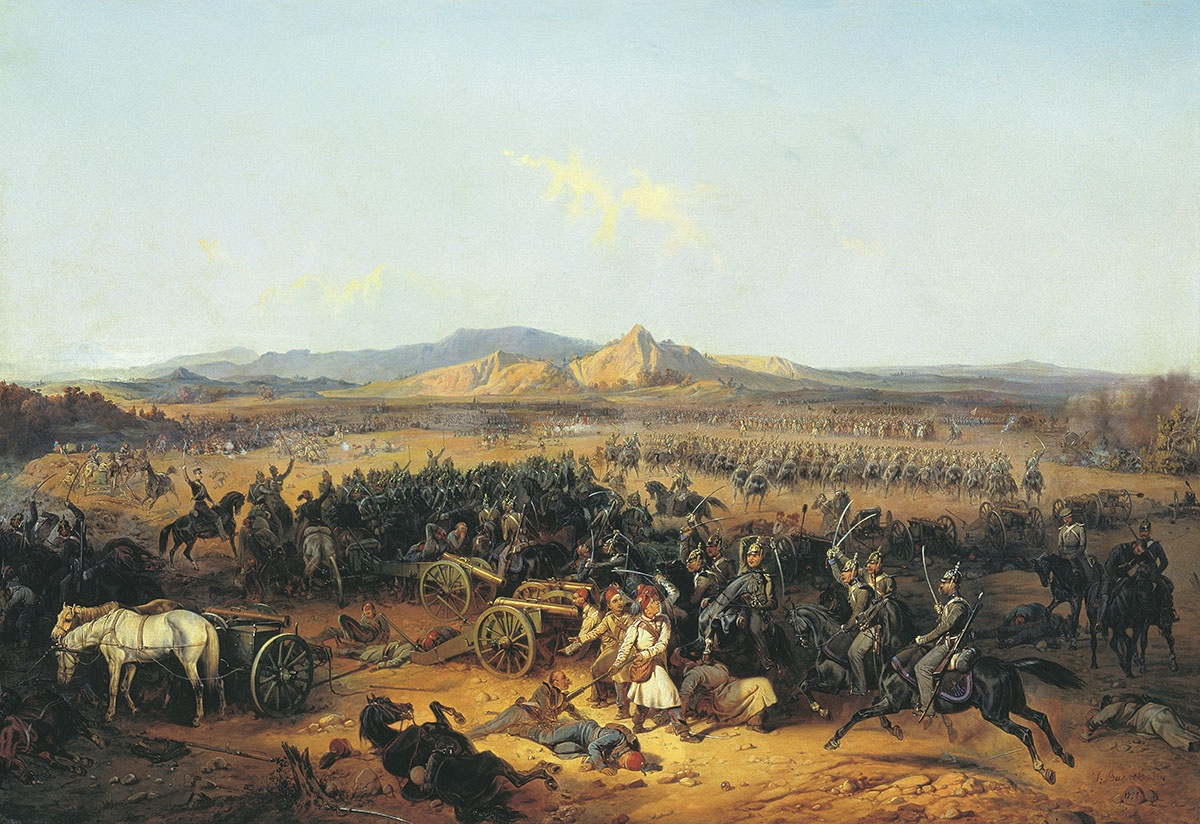
- Cavalry attack at Bashkadyklar; Bogdan Willewalde.
Date	1 December 1853
Location	Başgedikler, Ottoman Empire 40°39′08.00″N 43°33′32.89″E
Result	Russian victory

Belligerents
Russian Empire	Ottoman Empire

Commanders and leaders
(Russian Empire) Vasili Bebutov (Russian Empire) E.V. Brimmer (Russian Empire) Zakhary Chavchavadze (Russian Empire) Iliko Orbeliani (Russian Empire) I. Bagration-Mukhransky (Russian Empire) Alexander Baggovut (Russian Empire) Gen. Kishinsky	(Ottoman Empire) Ahmed Pasha (Ottoman Empire) Veli Pasha (Ottoman Empire) Mirliva Hüseyin Pasha (Ottoman Empire) Hasan Yazici (Ottoman Empire) Mirliva Mustafa Pasha

Strength
10,000; 32 guns	25,300; 32 guns

Casualties and losses
300 killed 900–1,000 wounded	1,500 killed 4,500–6,500 wounded 24 guns

The Battle of Başgedikler occurred on 1 December 1853 during the Crimean War when a Russian army attacked and defeated a large Turkish force near the village of Başgedikler in the Trans-Caucasus.

== Background ==
After the declaration of war between the Russian and Ottoman Empires in October 1853, both countries amassed armies on the two primary fronts, along the Danube and in the southern Caucasus. Russia maintained its primary military outpost in the area at Alexandropol while the Turk's primary fortress was at Kars.

In November 1853, the Turks assembled an army of 36,000 men and advanced from Kars to Baş Şüregel on the Akhurian River which served as the border with Russia. Across the river at that point was the Russian garrison of Bayindir and it was the intention of the Turks to drive the Russians back to Alexandropol.

On 13 November, the Ottoman Anatolian army under the command of Abdi Pasha easily drove 2,000 members of the Russian irregular cavalry out of Bayindir and took control of the garrison. The Russian commander at Alexandropol, General Vasili Bebutov immediately responded and lead a force of 10,000 men with 28 guns to Bayindir where on 14 November he engaged the Turks but quickly retreated after suffering a loss of 1,000 men to the Turkish artillery.

For the next 12 days there was no further fighting. During that time, Abdi Pasha remained in Bayindir bringing up additional reinforcements and building fortifications. Ultimately, however, Abdi Pasha became concerned that his army was not large enough and lacked adequate provisions to begin a major offensive especially with the coming of winter. As a result, Abdi Pasha abandoned Bayindir and began a retreat to the Turkish fortress at Kars. Russian General Bebutov, on the other hand, seemed to sense an opportunity to strike at his enemy and made the decision to pursue the retreating Turks.

== Maneuvers and troop deployments ==
On 18 November in pursuit of the retreating Turks, Bebutov had his army at Baş Şüregel on the west bank of the Akhurian River. The next morning Bebutov and his forces reached Pirvali where they proceeded to forge the Karschai River.

On 26 November after Abdi Pasha and his retreating army had reached Başgedikler, news was received that Russian forces had defeated the Turks at Akhaltsikhe in Georgian territory. Part of the blame for the defeat at Akhaltsikhe was attributed to Abdi Pasha and his decision not to conduct an offensive campaign against the Russians. As a result, Abdi Pasha made the decision to immediately go to Kars, putting the command of the retreating army into the hands of his chief of staff, Ahmed Pasha. Abdi Pasha ordered Ahmed Pasha to continue the retreat and did not believe that the Russians would continue a pursuit that would take them extensively into Turkish territory.

Sometime after Abdi Pasha had departed for Kars while the Turkish army was still in the vicinity of Başgedikler, Ahmed Pasha learned that the Russians were at the Karschai River, merely 10 kilometers away. Given the closeness of the enemy, Ahmed Pasha decided that avoiding a battle would be impossible and that he must take a stand and fight the Russians. Although the size of the Turkish army had shrunk somewhat from the start of the expedition, most notably from the loss of 3,000 members of the irregular cavalry that returned to their homes and Kars, Ahmed Pasha believed that he still held numerical superiority. Being caught by the Russians therefore may not have been untoward as Ahmed Pasha was seeking to demonstrate his skills in battle and believed that he could defeat the Russians.

To defend against the Russians, Ahmed Pasha deployed his forces along the Mavryak Chai River between two small villages. On the left near the village of Oğuzlu were six battalions of infantry and one cavalry regiment. On the right near the village of Hamzagerek was the main battery of 20 guns and four battalions, two in squares on the right and two behind. Between the two villages along a steep ravine were eight battalions along with Turkish and Kurd cavalry regiments. In reserve were three infantry battalions and six guns.

As Bebutov and the Russians approached the Turk's defensive positions on the morning of 1 December, the Russian plan was to attack the village of Oğuzlu in part to block the Turks from retreating down the road leading to Kars. The Russian battle formation consisted of three lines: A first line composed of nine battalions – dragoons on the edges with four light guns, infantry in the center with 16 guns, and 900 Cossacks; a second line composed of four battalions of grenadiers and six guns; and a reserve third line composed of three battalions of grenadiers and a regiment of cavalry.

== Battle ==
The battle began at noon with a short exchange of artillery fire. Shortly thereafter, Bebutov followed his original battle plan and sent infantry from the first line commanded by General Kishinsky in an attempt to climb the ravine and attack the Turks on their left wing near the village of Oğuzlu. The Russian offensive was quickly repulsed by the Turkish infantry protected by their fortifications and hidden in the ravine.

At approximately 1 pm, Bebutov changed his battle plan and decided to attack the Turk's right wing where the main artillery battery was located. Grenadiers from the second line under the command of Generals Orbeliani and Bagration-Mukhransky were sent straight up the ravine toward the Turkish battery. The first line moved to their left and supported the efforts of the second line grenadiers. After the Russians reached the top of the ravine several guns were initially captured, but Turkish reserves counterattacked and quickly reclaimed their armaments. During this offensive charge, Russian casualties were high and included the loss of General Orbeliani.

Just as it looked as if the Russian attack on the Turkish right wing would fail, General Bebutov arrived with two battalions of grenadiers from the reserve and renewed the attack. General Bagration-Mukhransky was able to regroup and lead his men to a position where he could hit the Turks in the flank. At the same time, Russian General Baggovut and his dragoons fought off the Turkish cavalry, crossed the river, and rode to the top of the plateau where they attacked the Turkish squares with their mobile guns. This led to the destruction of the squares and the capture of the full 20-gun battery. At that point, the entire right wing and part of the center of the Turkish defenses crumbled. The Turkish infantry then began to scatter and retreat.

As this fighting was taking place, the Turkish forces on the left wing near the village of Oğuzlu mounted an offensive on the Russian right. The Turkish and Kurd cavalry forces repeatedly attempted to execute flanking movements but their efforts were repelled by the Russian dragoons and cavalry commanded by Georgian General Chavchavadze. A Turkish infantry effort was also repelled by the bombardments of the Russian chief of artillery, General Brimmer. At that time, the battle for the Turkish battery on the right ended in defeat for the Turks and General Kishinsky redirected his infantry to counterattack the Turkish left. By 3 pm the Russians entered the village of Oğuzlu. At that point, the Turks began to flee in disarray and the battle was over. Those Turks not taken captive withdrew in retreat west toward their fortress in Kars.

Too exhausted to pursue their enemy, the Russians allowed many of the Turks to withdraw. Although the Russians suffered 1,200–1,300 casualties including approximately 300 men killed, the Turkish losses were much higher at 6,000–8,000 casualties including approximately 1,500 men killed. The Turks also lost their entire camp along with 24 guns, military supplies, and provisions.

== Aftermath ==
The Turkish loss at Başgedikler ended the Ottoman Empire's ability to seize the Caucasus at the start of the Crimean War. It established the border with Russia over the winter of 1853–1854 and allowed the Russians time to reinforce their presence in the region.

More importantly from a strategic viewpoint, the Turkish loss demonstrated to the allies of the Ottoman Empire that the Turkish military was not capable of resisting the invasion of the Russians without assistance. This resulted in a deeper intervention of the western European powers in the affairs of the Crimean War and the Ottoman Empire.
