= Kvareli =

Kvareli ყვარელი
- Town
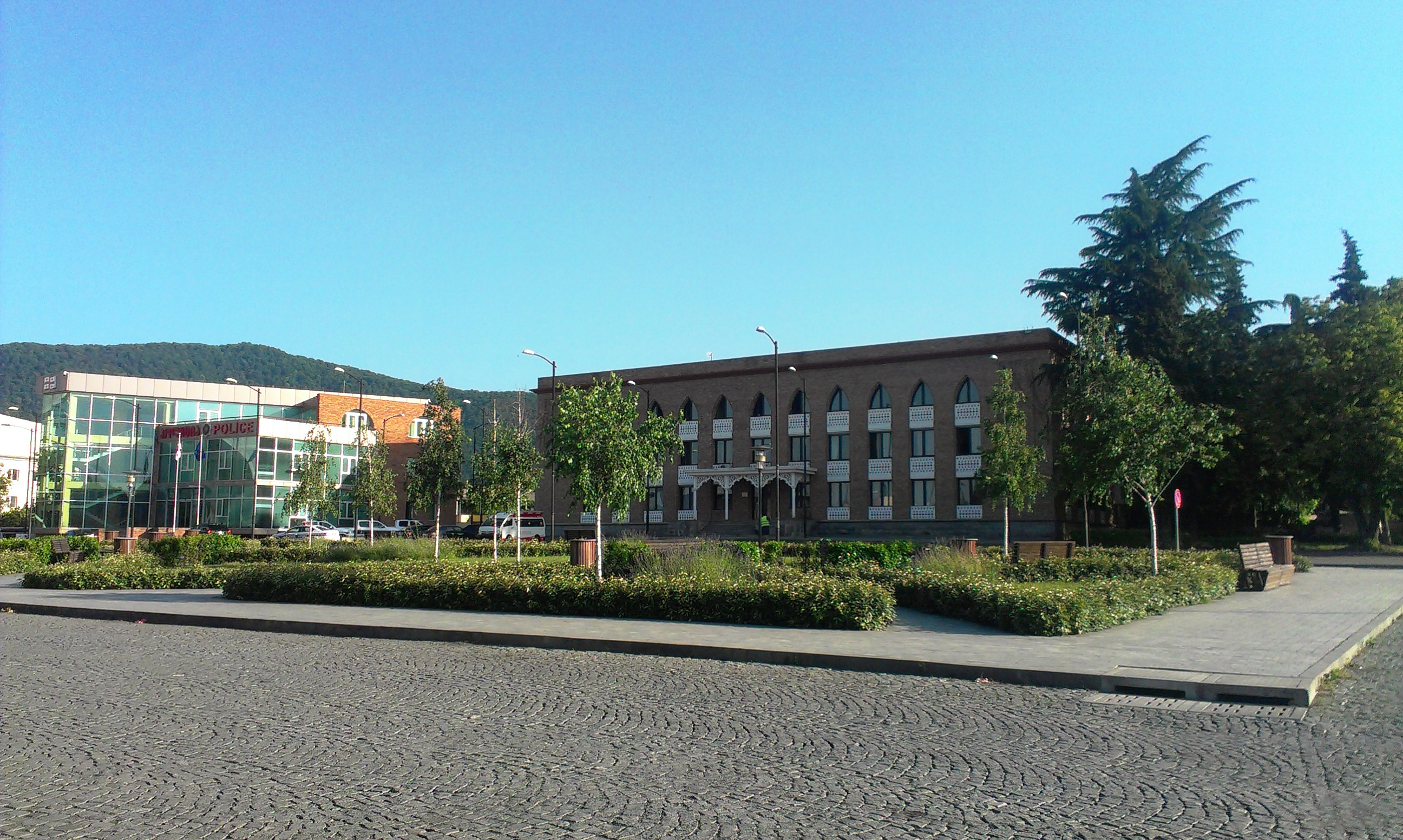

- Location within Georgia Location within Kakheti
- Coordinates: 41°57′00″N 45°48′55″E
- Country: Georgia
- Mkhare: Kakheti
- Municipality: Kvareli
- Town: 1964
- Elevation: 450 m (1,480 ft)

Population (2014)
  - Total: 7,739
  - Estimate (2024): 9,880
- Time zone: UTC+4 (Georgian Time)
- Area code: 4800
- Distance from Tbilisi: 161 km

Kvareli (Georgian: ყვარელი, pronounced [qʼʷaɾeli]) is a town in northeastern Kakheti Province, Georgia. Located in the Alazani Valley, near the foothills of the Greater Caucasus Mountains, it was the birthplace of Georgian author Ilia Chavchavadze, whose one-storied house is preserved as a local museum.

The area is in the center of the Kakheti wine-producing region, and the town itself is known for its Kindzmarauli wine, a semisweet red variety.

== Geography ==
The town of Kvareli is located in the Alazani valley, approximately 134 km from the capital Tbilisi. It has a moderately humid subtropical climate, with moderately cold winters and hot summers.

== Local history ==
In 1755, a battle took place when the Kingdom of Kartli-Kakheti protected the local fortress from Muhammad-nutsal IV. The casualties of the kingdom were only light, and this event is remembered as the Battle of Kvareli.

== Demographics ==
Historical population
Year	Pop.	±% p.a.
1989	11,271	—
2002	9,045	−1.68%
2014	7,739	−1.29%
2024	9,880	+2.47%
Source: Population data (1989 and 2002) and 2014

== Notable people ==
Notable people who are from or have resided in Kvareli:

- Ilia Chavchavadze (1837–1907), Georgian writer and poet.
- Nikolay Chavchavadze (1830–1897), general of the Russian Empire
- Zurabi Iakobishvili (b. 1992), Georgian freestyle wrestler
- Kote Marjanishvili (1872–1933) Georgian theater director

== Gallery ==
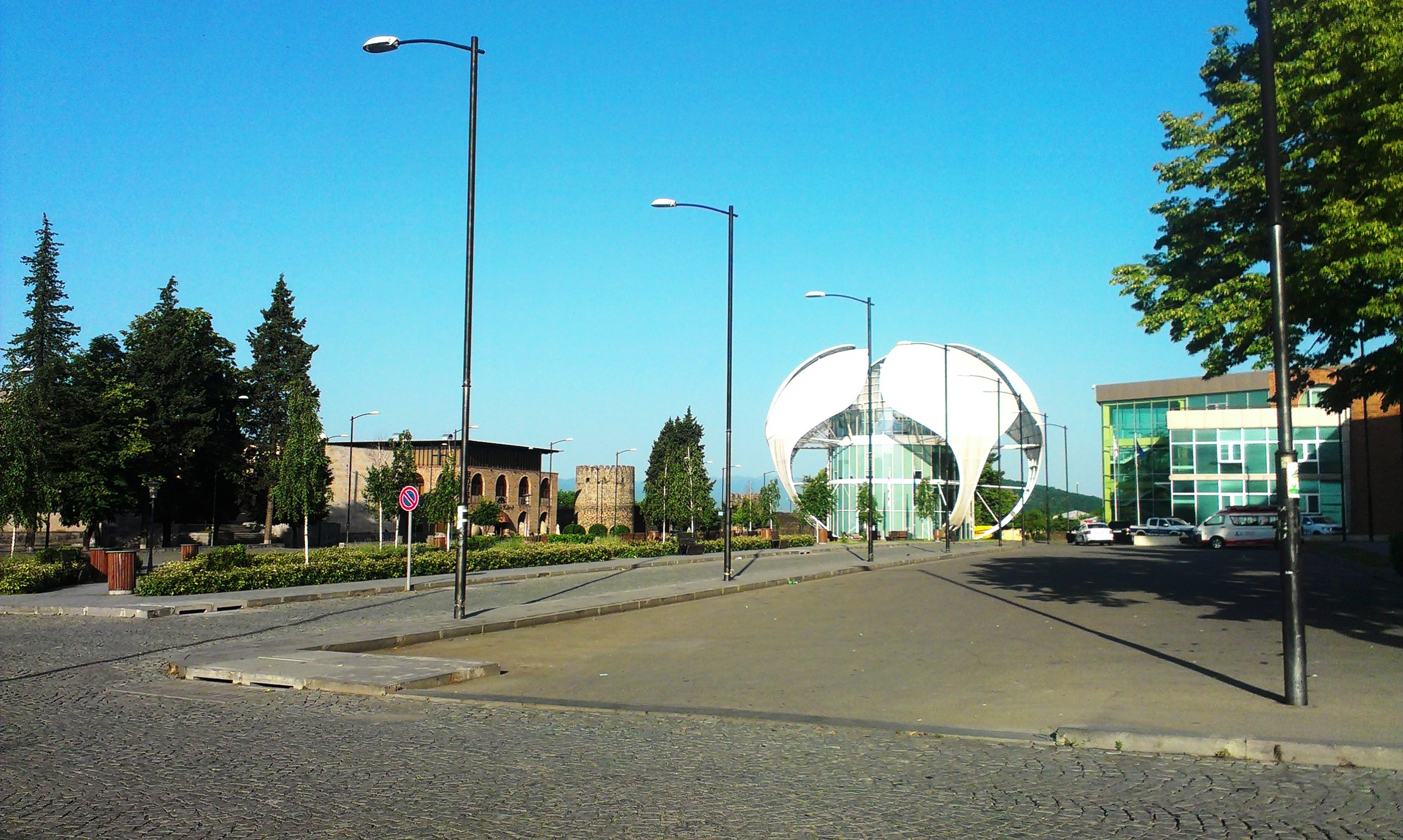
Justice House of Kvareli

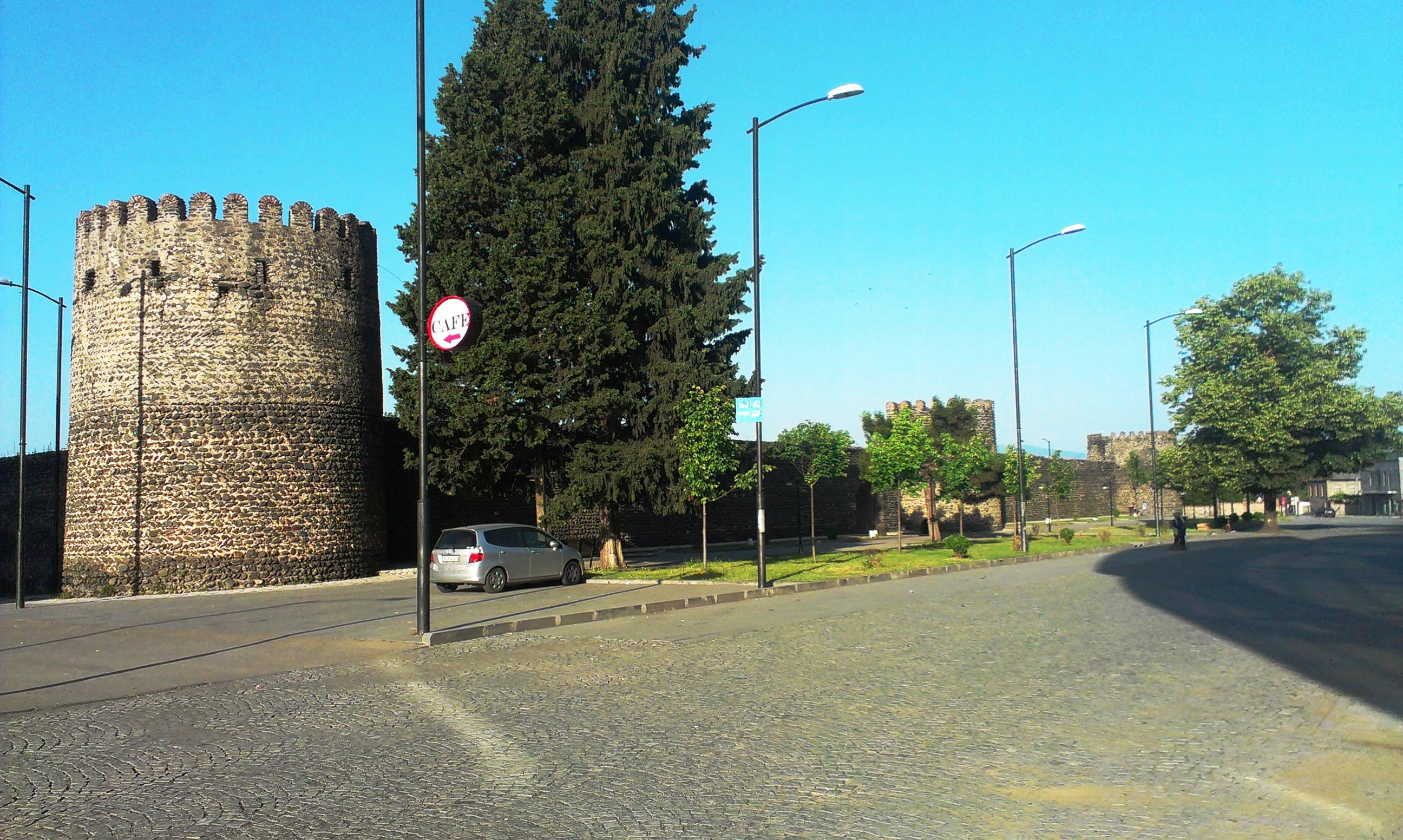
Kvareli Stadium

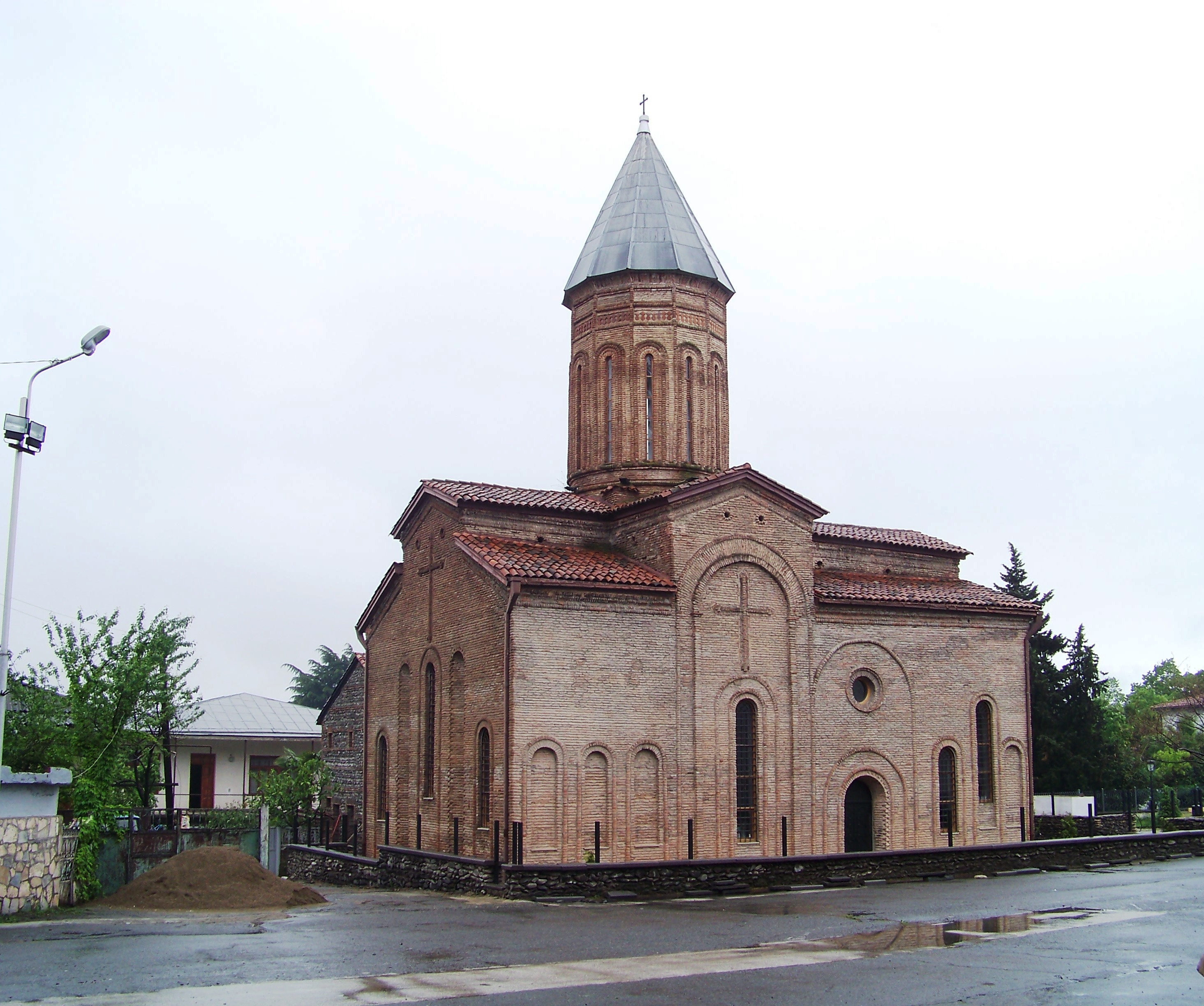
Church of John the Baptist in Kvareli

Kvareli Library

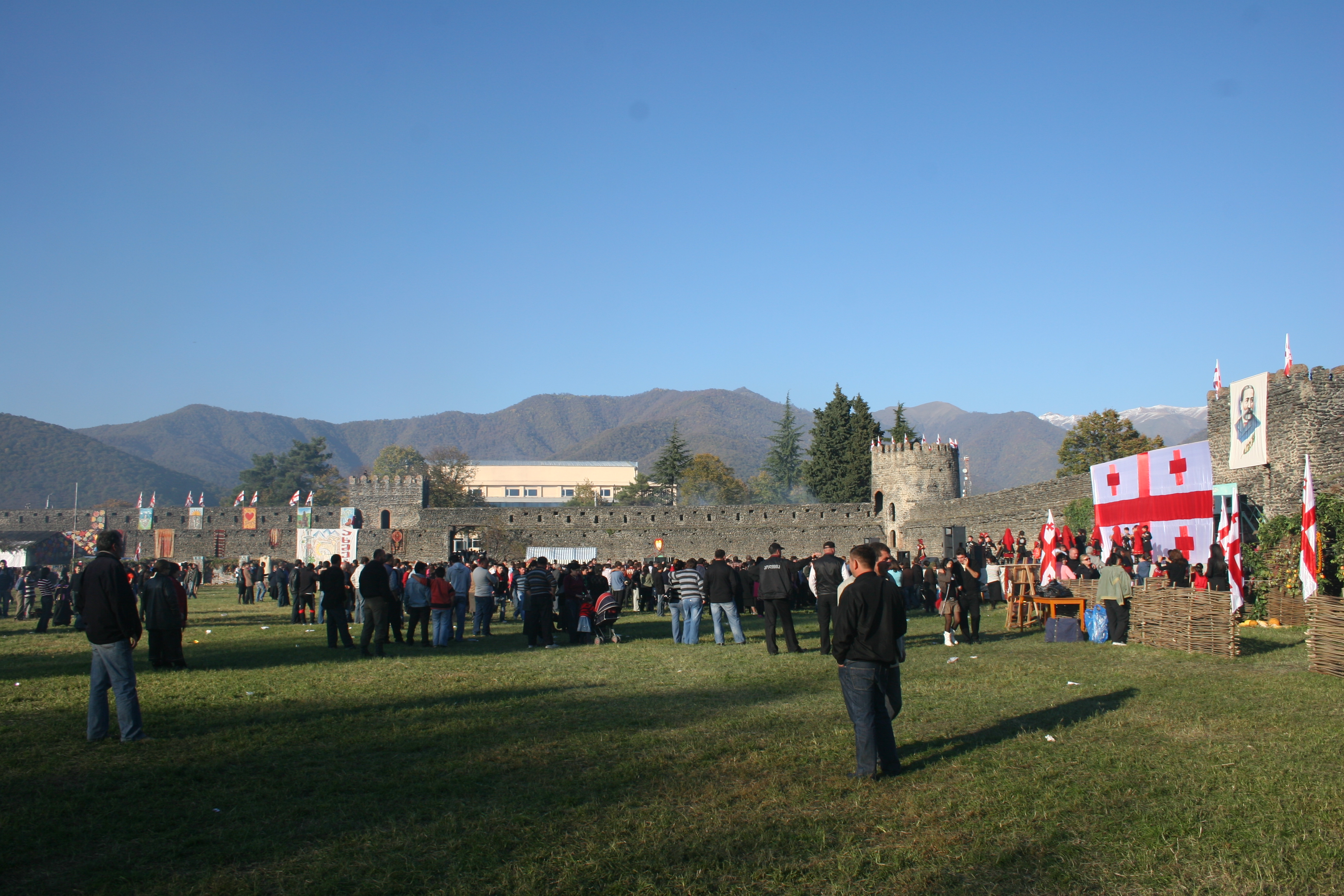
Commemoration of Ilia Chavchavadze in November 2010

== See also ==
- Kakheti
- Gremi
- Tsinandali
- Battle of Kvareli
