= Vasili Bebutov =

Russian Imperial general

Vasili Osipovich Bebutov Armenian: Վասիլ Բեհբութով
- Russian: Василий Осипович Бебутов
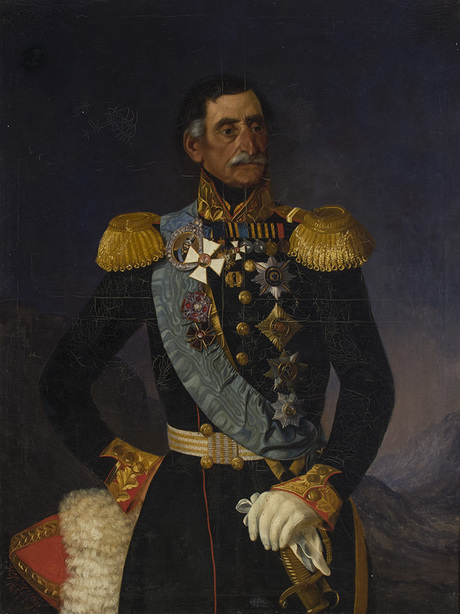
- Portrait by Stepanos Nersissian
- Born: 1 January 1791
- Died: 7 April 1858 (aged 67)
- Military career
- Rank: General of the Infantry & Adjutant General
- Conflicts: Russo-Turkish War; Napoleonic Wars; Patriotic War of 1812; Russo-Turkish War (1828–1829); Battle of Akhaltsikhe; Crimean War; Battle of Başgedikler; Battle of Kurekdere
- Awards: Order of St. Anne; Order of St. Vladimir; Gold Sword for Bravery; Weapons: Gold Sword for Bravery

Vasili Osipovich Bebutov (Armenian: Վասիլ Բեհբութով, Russian: Василий Осипович Бебутов, romanized: Vasiliy Osipovich Bebutov) (1 January 1791 – 7 April 1858) was an Imperial Russian general and a member of an Armenian noble family of Bebutashvili/Bebutov.

Bebutov was in the military since 1809. Served in the Russo-Turkish War of 1806–1812 and the Patriotic War of 1812. Since 1816 he was Adjutant General of the H. I. M. Retinue and served with A. P. Yermolov. During the Russo-Turkish War of 1828–29 he participated in the takeover of Akhaltsikhe and commanded the defense thereof against an attempt by Ahmed Pasha of Adjara to recapture it for the Ottomans. In 1830 he was made the governor of the Armenian Oblast. From 1844 to 1847 he fought Imam Shamil. He was awarded the Order of Saint George of the second degree on 6 December 1853 for his services after he defeated the Ottomans in the battle of Başgedikler during the Crimean War.

Bebutov was appointed the Russian Commander-in-Chief in Asia in 1855, replacing General Muravyov.

== Honours and awards ==
- Order of St. Anne, 3rd class (1813), 1st class (1829)
- Order of St. Vladimir, 4th class (1819), 2nd class (1844)
- Gold Sword for Bravery (1828)
- Order of St. George, 4th class (1830), 3rd class (1846), 2nd class (1853)
- Order of the White Eagle (1847)
- Order of St. Alexander Nevsky (1849)
- Order of St. Andrew (1854)
