= Lekianoba =

Sporadic Dagestani raids into Georgia (16th–19th centuries)

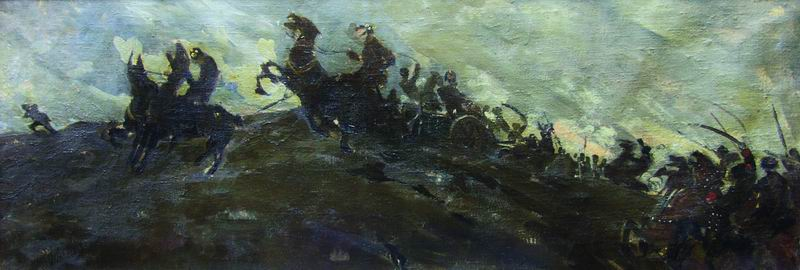
1921 painting by Valerian Sidamon-Eristavi depicting the Georgian king Heraclius II fighting against the Lezgins during a major incursion from the Avar Khanate under Nursal Bek.

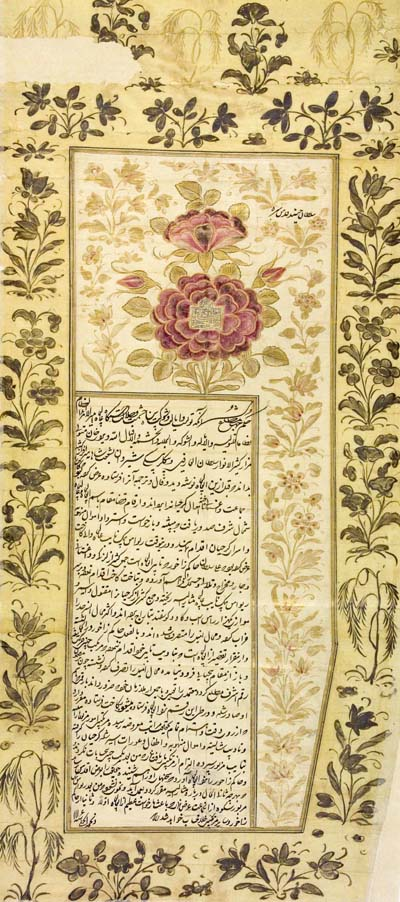
A formal hukm issued by the Safavid king Soltan Hoseyn in 1705 ordering the punishment of Dagestani tribesmen responsible for forays into the Georgian region of Kakheti.

Lekianoba (Georgian: ლეკიანობა) was the name given to sporadic forays by Dagestani highlanders into the territory of present-day Georgia between the 16th and 19th centuries. The term is derived from Leki, which was the Georgian term for the Dagestani highlanders (initially only those of southern Dagestan); with the suffix –anoba, which designates attribution. The references to these raids appear in the epic poetry of the Avars, and the names of the rulers who led the most devastating attacks—Umma-Khan, Nursal-Bek, and Mallachi—are mentioned in Georgian sources.

The attacks began with the disintegration of the Kingdom of Georgia and the subsequent decline of its successor states as a result of incessant defensive warfare against the Safavids and the Ottomans. In the late 16th century, part of the Georgian marchlands in the Kingdom of Kakheti (later known as Saingilo) was given by the Safavid king Abbas I to his Dagestani allies, who would use it as a base for subsequent invasions.

Though chiefly on a small scale, these assaults were frequent enough to be rather devastating to the fragmented country, with the marauders taking hostages and pillaging border settlements. From time to time, incursions evolved into major military operations involving thousands of troops and led by Dagestani feudal warlords, often in alliance with either Safavid or Ottoman troops. Alongside Kakheti, the Kingdom of Kartli was one of the two eastern Georgian kingdoms that suffered the most in these raids. Often taken by surprise, the Georgians failed to build up an effective defence mechanism against Lekianoba, largely due to constant internal conflicts and rivalry among the various Georgian polities. Furthermore, Dagestani mercenaries were frequently used by rival Georgian kings and princes against one another.

In the early 1720s, Georgian king Vakhtang VI intensified his efforts to counter Dagestani raids. In 1722, he decided to join his troops with the Imperial Russian Army during the Persian campaign of Peter the Great. However, Peter soon reached terms with Tahmasp II, forcing Vakhtang to recall his men. Georgia's fragile independence finally collapsed under the weight of continued Safavid and Ottoman aggression over the course of the two subsequent decades, giving Dagestani raiders more chances to attack. In 1744, Georgian king Teimuraz II and his son Heraclius II revived the kingdoms of Kartli and Kakheti from their Safavid overlord Nader Shah, subsequently combining their forces to keep the Dagestani highlanders in check. From 1750 to 1755, they thrice successfully repulsed a large coalition of Dagestani clans led by the Avar khan Nursal Bek. In 1774, Heraclius II created a special military force that initially, under the command of his son Levan, served as an effective instrument against the Dagestanis. However, facing an internal crisis in his kingdom, he was unable to decisively eliminate the threat posed by these raids. In 1785 and 1787, the Ottoman-allied Avar khan Omar twice attacked Kakheti, leaving several Georgian border villages in ruins. However, in 1800, a Georgian force destroyed Omar and his large Avar army in the Battle of Niakhura. After the Russian annexation of Georgia in 1801, the frequency of Dagestani raids weakened significantly as the Imperial Russian Army pursued its campaign to conquer the entire Caucasus. Amidst the Caucasian War, in 1854, the Dagestani leader Imam Shamil was able to mount what is largely considered the last Lekianoba incident when he raided Tsinandali.

== In popular culture ==
- What did Iavnana do? is an 1890 work of the Georgian writer Iakob Gogebashvili. Its film adaptation, directed by Nana Janelidze, was released in 1994. It tells about the fate of Keto, a Georgian girl abducted and sold by the Lezgins.

== See also ==
- Battle of Ghartiskari
- Battle of Aspindza
- Battle of Kvareli
- Avar raids on Georgia (1785)
- Battle of Niakhura
