= Battle of Kvareli =

Battle between Georgian armies and the Avar Khanate (1755)

Battle of Kvareli (1755)
- Part of Lekianoba
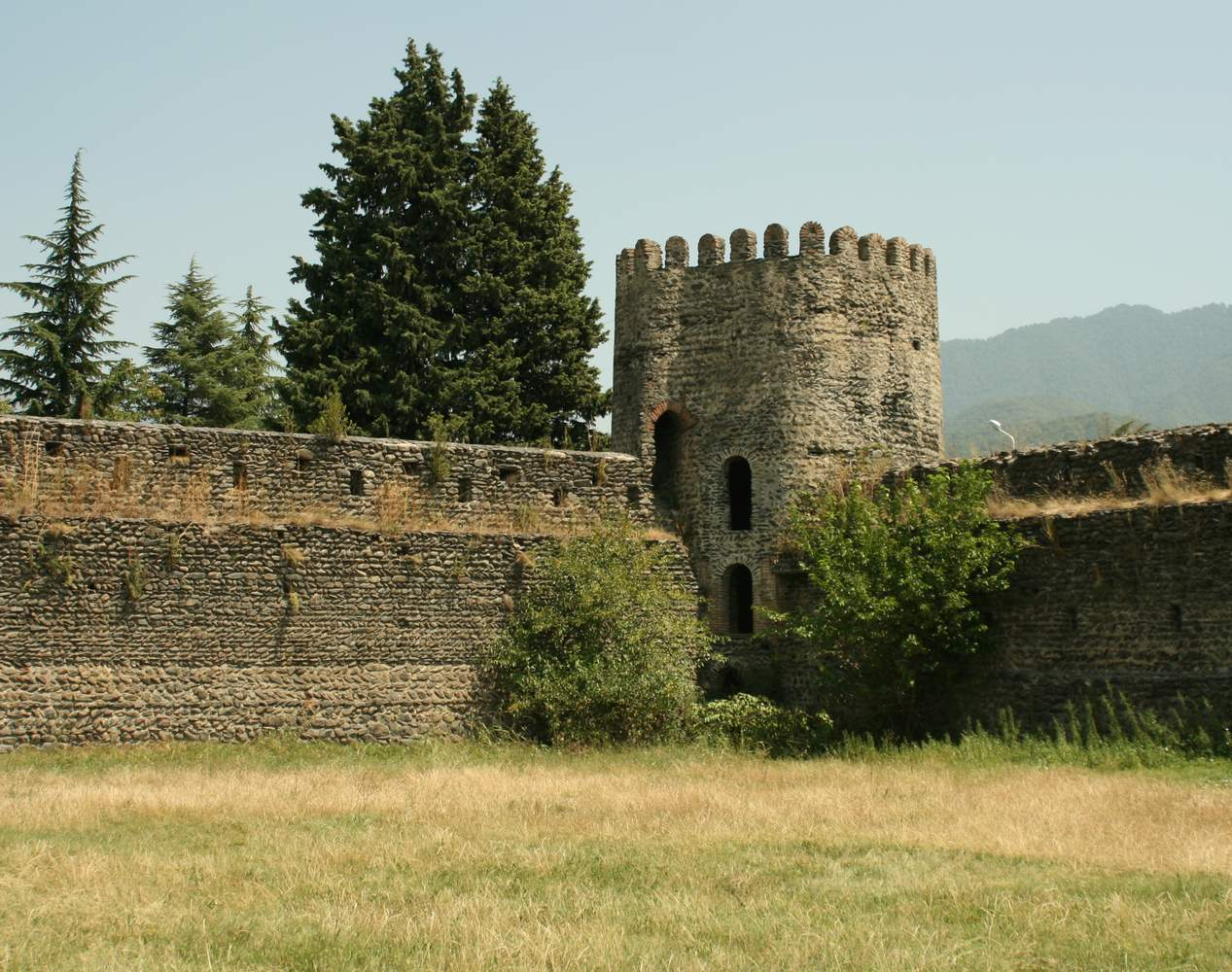
- Inner walls of Kvareli castle
Date	28 September, 1755
Location	Kvareli (Kvareli Castle), Georgia
Result	Georgian victory

Belligerents
Kingdom of Kakheti; Kingdom of Kartli	Avar Khanate; Jar-Balakan; Gazikumukh Khanate; Shaki Khanate

Commanders and leaders
(Kingdom of Kakheti) Heraclius II; Teimuraz II	Muhammad-nutsal IV

Strength
206 men	~30,000 men

Casualties and losses
Very light	Unknown

The Battle of Kvareli (Georgian: ყვარლის ბრძოლა) took place between the Kingdoms of Kartli and Kakheti and the Avar Khanate as well as its tributaries in 1755. Nursal-Bey, leading a Dagestani and Jar-Balakan army, laid siege to the castle at Kvareli.

== Background ==
Throughout the 1720s-50s, Avar Khanate raids were a constant threat to the Kingdom of Georgia's successor states. Though chiefly of small scale, these assaults were frequent enough to be rather devastating to the fragmentized countries, with the marauders taking hostages and pillaging the border settlements. From time to time, these attacks evolved into major military operations involving thousands of troops and conducted by the Dagestani feudal warlords, often in alliance with either the Persians or Ottomans. The Kingdom of Kakheti and Kingdom of Kartli were the two eastern Georgian kingdoms that suffered the most. Often taken by surprise, the Georgians failed to build up an effective defense mechanism against these raids largely due to the permanent internal wars and rivalry among the Georgian politicians, especially from the House of Mukhrani.

In 1744, Teimuraz II and his son Heraclius II of Kakheti re-established the kingdoms of Kartli and Kakheti from their overlord, Nader Shah, and joined their forces to check the Dagestani assaults. From 1750 to 1755, they successfully repulsed a large coalition of the Dagestani clans led by the Avar khan Nursal Bey. In 1774, Heraclius II created a special military force that initially, under the command of Heraclius's son Levan, served as an effective instrument against the Dagestani marauders. However, facing an internal crisis in his kingdom, Heraclius was unable to finally eliminate the threats from the Caucasian mountaineers.

== Battle ==
In 1755, Avar khan Nursal-Bey invaded the Kingdom of Kakheti with an army of 20,000-30,000 soldiers, originating from Jar-Balakan and Dagestan. The Avar army was supplemented by Shamkhalate of Tarki and Gazikumukh Khanate, fighters from other principalities of Dagestan, as well as detachments from Shaki Khanate and Ganja Khanate. In July of 1755, he laid siege to the Kvareli castle, a large fortress built on the Kakheti plains. The defense of Kvareli fortress was of great importance for the future of Georgia, because if the enemy won and the fortress fell, the area beyond Alazni would remain with the enemy, then it would not be difficult to conquer all of Kakheti. Even the weakened Kartli would easily be conquered by Nursal-Bey and through the Ottomans, he would be able to reach western Georgia. Based on the size of the castle and the range of rifle fire at this time, it is estimated that Nursal-Beg's siege lines would have stretched 2 kilometres (1.2 mi) to fully encircle the castle. At this time, King Teimuraz II of Kartli and King Heraclius II of Kakheti had no standing army, although Nursal-Bey was unaware of this. After 20 days of siege, 206 Georgian warriors loaded with food and ammunition were sent to Kvareli at night, crossing the Alazani river, sneaking past the Avars guards and fought their way to the castle while herdsmen managed to burn the khanate's camp around the castle. In addition, Heraclius sent an army to raid the undefended Jar-Balakan. Jar-Balakanians abandoned the siege and returned to their country to save their wives and children, but the raiding party had already moved on to Shamkhalate of Tarki, Gazikumukh Khanate, Shaki Khanate and Ganja Khanate with each khanate contingency abandoning the siege to protect their homeland. Meanwhile King Teimuraz and King Heraclius had gathered an army to attack the besiegers, breaking through the thinly spread lines.
