= Nikolay Chavchavadze =

Georgian prince and Russian general (1830–1897)

- ნიკოლოზ ჭავჭავაძე
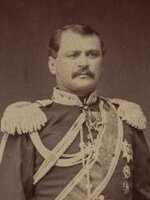
- Born: 22 October 1830; Kvareli, Russian Empire (now Georgia)
- Died: 29 March 1897 (aged 66)
- Military career
- Allegiance: Russian Empire
- Service years: 1842–1897
- Rank: General of the Cavalry
- Unit: Novgorod Dragoon Regiment
- Commands: Imperial Guard forces Mixed cavalry division Russian forces in the Dagestan theatre of war
- Conflicts: Caucasus War; Crimean War; Russo-Turkish War (1877–1878); Caucasian Theatre
- Awards: Gold Sword for Bravery

Nikolay (Nikoloz) Zurabovich Chavchavadze (Georgian: ნიკოლოზ ჭავჭავაძე, Russian: Николай Зурабович Чавчавадзе; 22 October 1830 – 29 March 1897) was a Georgian prince of the Chavchavadze family and a general of the Russian Empire. He was the brother of general Zakhary Chavchavadze. They were veterans of the Caucasian War and Russo-Turkish War of 1877–1878.

== Life ==
Nikoloz Chavchavadze was born on 22 October 1830 in the village Kvareli of the Kakheti province, Georgia, then part of the Russian Empire. He was prince of the princely Georgian house of Chavchavadzes who were in Russian service. He and his brother served in the imperial Russian army and became generals. Both were also injured and nearly killed in battle.

Nikolay entered service in the Tsars army in 1847. He became officer in 1850 after distinguishing himself in the Caucasian War for which he received the Cross of St. George. He then got involved in the Crimean War and lead several successful cavalry raids against Turkish troops that invaded Guria, Western Georgia. In that period he got wounded twice. The first time a bullet went through his throat and shoulder and the second was a sword strike to the hand. For his military deeds he was transferred to the Russian Imperial Guard

Following the Crimean War, Chavchavadze returned to the still ongoing Caucasian War, participating in numerous battles and skirmishes along the Abkhazian coastline, Chechnya and Dagestan for which he received several decorations and got promoted to colonel in 1863. He got further promoted to major-general in 1871, having served for 26 years at that point.

On 26 February 1872 the general became part of the H. I. M. Retinue. During the Russo-Turkish War (1877–1878) Chavchavadze commanded a mixed cavalry division at the Russo-Turkish border and was appointed commander of the Dagestan province. For his actions during the war he got rewarded with the Gold Sword for Bravery among other awards and was made governor of the same province in 1880. One year later he was promoted to lieutenant general and a decade later in 1892 to Adjutant-general, a rank he held until his final promotion to General of the cavalry in 1896.
