= Sergey Lazarevich Lashkarev =

Russian Imperial Major-General of Georgian origin

Sergey Lazarevich Lashkarev Lashkarashvili-Bibiluri
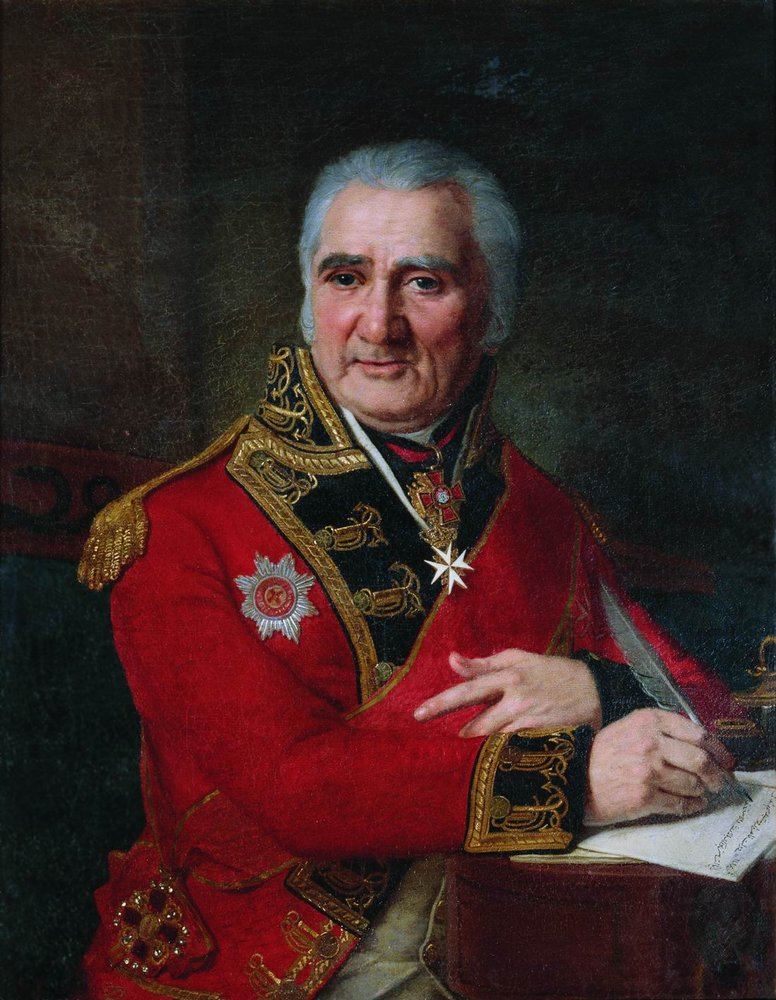
- Portrait of Lashkarev by Vladimir Borovikovsky
- Born: February 23, 1739
- Died: October 6, 1814 (aged 75); Vitebsk Governorate
- Occupations: General, statesman

Sergey Lazarevich Lashkarev (23 February 1739 — 6 October 1814) (Russian: Сергей Лазаревич Лашкарёв, derived from Georgian: ლაშკარაშვილი ბიბილური, Lashkarashvili-Bibiluri), was a Russian Imperial Major-General of Georgian origin. A cunning diplomat and polyglot, he was described by his contemporaries as one of the "remarkable phenomena of Catherine the Great's century". Lashkarev was reportedly fluent in ten languages. Besides Russian and Georgian, he spoke French, Italian, Turkish, Persian, Greek, Armenian, Arabic, and Latin. In 1800, Lashkarev was actively involved in diplomatic exchanges with the Ottoman Empire in connection with the impending Russian annexation of various Georgian kingdoms and principalities, and remained in charge of Georgian affairs at the Imperial court under Alexander I of Russia.

== Personal life ==
Lashkarev was the son of a Georgian nobleman Lazare Grigoris dze Lashkarashvili-Bibiluri (later known as Lashkarev-Bibilurov) who moved to Russia from Georgia as part of a royal entourage accompanying the exiled Georgian monarch Vakhtang VI.

Lashkarev had four children:

- Pavel Sergeevich Lashkarev (1776—1857) — Major-General, hero of the Napoleonic Wars
- Aleksandr Sergeevich Lashkarev (1779—1849) — General-Lieutenant, recipient of the Order of St. George
- Sergey Sergeevich Lashkarev (1783—1858) — Privy Councillor of the Russian Empire, Diplomat
- Grigory Sergeevich Lashkarev (1788—1849) — General-Lieutenant, Governor of Volhynian Governorate, as well as that of Podolia Governorate and Kiev Governorates.

== See also ==
- Georgians in Russia
- Pavel Tsitsianov
- Vakhtang VI
