= Nizhny Dzhengutay =

Nizhny Dzhengutay Нижний Дженгутай Тёбен Жюнгютей
- Selo
- Location within Republic of Dagestan Location within Russia
- Coordinates: 42°41′N 47°14′E
- Country: Russia
- Region: Republic of Dagestan
- District: Buynaksky District
- Time zone: UTC+3:00

Nizhny Dzhengutay (Russian: Нижний Дженгутай; Kumyk: Тёбен Жюнгютей, Töben Jüñütey) is a rural locality (a selo) in Buynaksky District, Republic of Dagestan, Russia. The population was 7 519 as of 2010. There are 35 streets.

== Geography ==
Nizhny Dzhengutay is located 20 km southeast of Buynaksk (the district's administrative centre) by road, on the Paraul-ozen River. Verkhy Dzhengutay and Dorgeli are the nearest rural localities.
