= Kunzakh =

Kunzakh Кунзах Кунзахъ
- Selo
- Location within Republic of Dagestan Location within Russia
- Coordinates: 42°44′N 46°39′E
- Country: Russia
- Region: Republic of Dagestan
- District: Gumbetovsky District
- Time zone: UTC+3:00

Kunzakh (Russian: Кунзах; Avar: Кунзахъ) is a rural locality (a selo) in Igalinsky Selsoviet, Gumbetovsky District, Republic of Dagestan, Russia. The population was 362 as of 2010. There are 3 streets.

== Geography ==
Kunzakh is located 26 km southeast of Mekhelta (the district's administrative centre) by road. Tantari and Kakhabroso are the nearest rural localities.
