= Zakhary Chavchavadze =

ზაქარია ჭავჭავაძე Zakhary Chavchavadze
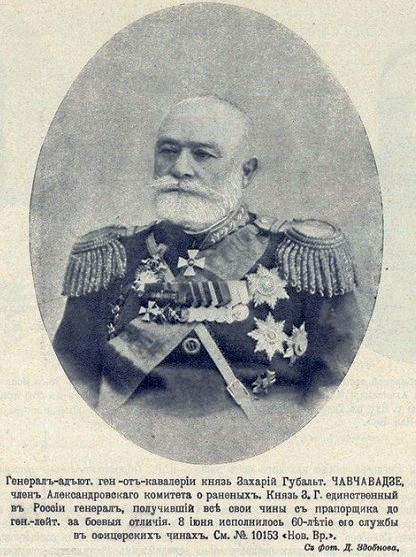
- General Zakhary Chavchavadze
- Born: 5 October 1825
- Died: 4 November 1905 (aged 80)
- Military career
- Allegiance: Russian Empire
- Service years: 1842–1905
- Rank: Adjutant general in the rank of General of the cavalry
- Unit: Novgorod Dragoon regiment
- Commands: several cavalry divisions 1st Caucasian Army Corps
- Conflicts: Caucasus War; Crimean War; Russo-Turkish War; Caucasian theatre
- Awards: Weapons:

Zakhary Gulbatovich Chavchavadze (Georgian: ზაქარია ჭავჭავაძე, Russian: Захарий Гульбатович Чавчавадзе; October 5, 1825 – November 4, 1905) was a Russian general and Georgian prince of the Chavchavadze noble family.

== Military career ==
Chavchavadze began his military service as an ensign in the Novgorod Dragoon regiment on 31 August 1842. Two years later he would become an officer and in the following years prove himself multiple times during the Caucasian War. In 1847 he was promoted to Lieutenant and in 1847 to staff captain. He was heavily involved with his regiment in the Crimean War and received several high decorations and citations. In 1855 the captain was wounded in battle, receiving a bullet that partially penetrated his skull.

At the end of the Crimean war Chavchavadze returned to the Caucasus to continue participate in the Caucasian campaigns. For his successes he earned several more decorations including the Gold Sword for Bravery and Order of Saint Stanislaus. On 25 June he got promoted to senior lieutenant and took command over several cavalry regiments until his promotion to major-general in 1874.

General Chavchavadze subsequently participated in the Russo-Turkish War, particularly its Caucasian theatre, the decisive battle at mount Avliyar and the Battle of Kars. For his actions he received another sword of the award Gold Sword for Bravery with diamond crosses and was promoted to lieutenant-general. After taking command over several consolidated cavalry divisions of the Caucasian provinces he was appointed commander of the 1st Caucasian Army Corps until his death in 1905. He is the only general in Russian history who rose through the ranks from ensign to general of the branch (General of the Cavalry) based purely on combat distinction.

== Awards ==
Four times Order of Saint Anna (1848, 1853, 1863, 1877)
Three times Order of Saint Vladimir (1859, 1865, 1883)
Twice Order of St. George (1854, 1877)
Twice Gold Sword for Bravery (1857, 1877)
Twice Order of Saint Stanislaus (House of Romanov) (1859, 1871)
Order of the White Eagle (Russian Empire) (1886)
Order of Saint Alexander Nevsky (1890)
