= Shambulbina =

Shambulbina may refer to:

- Şambul, Azerbaijan
- Şambulbinə, Azerbaijan
