= Beretbinə =

Beretbina or Beretbinə may refer to:

- Beretbina, Balakan, Azerbaijan
- Beretbina, Zaqatala, Azerbaijan
