= Qasbinə =

- Municipality
- Location within Azerbaijan Location within Shaki-Zagatala Economic Region
- Coordinates: 41°41′39″N 46°26′16″E
- Country: Azerbaijan
- Rayon: Balakan

Population
  - Total: 2,110
- Time zone: UTC+4 (AZT)
  - Summer (DST): UTC+5 (AZT)

Qasbinə is a village and municipality in the Balakan Rayon of Azerbaijan. It has a population of 2,110. The municipality consists of the villages of Qasbinə and Qaracabinə.
