= Khalatala =

Khalatala may refer to:

- Xalatala, Azerbaijan
- Xalatalabinə, Azerbaijan
- Xələftala, Azerbaijan
