= Katekhi Church =

Georgian monastery in Azerbaijan

Katekhi Church კატეხის ეკლესია
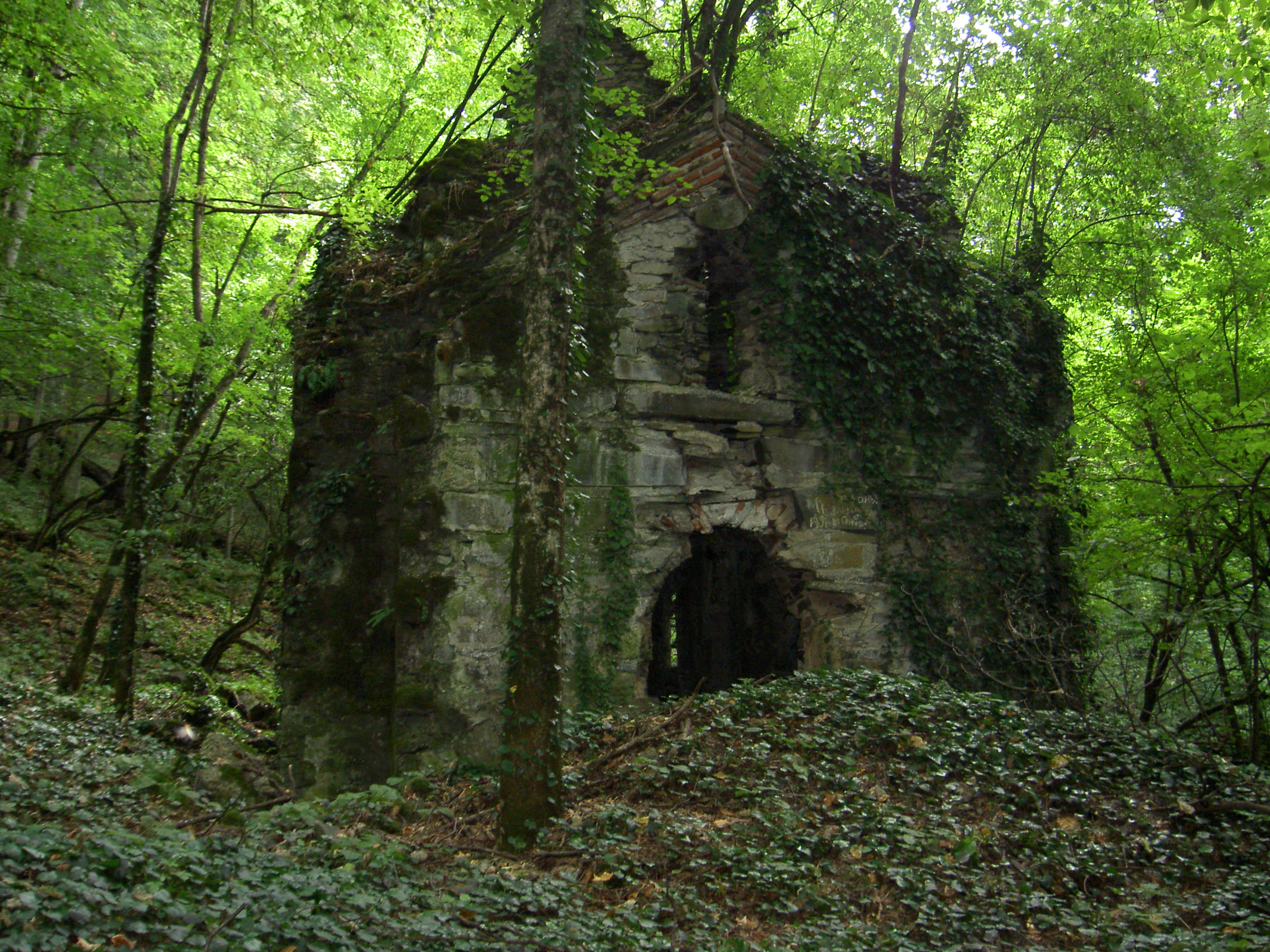

- Location within Azerbaijan

Religion
- Affiliation: Georgian Orthodox Church
- Status: Not functioning

Location
- Location: Balakan District, Azerbaijan
- Interactive map of Katekhi Church კატეხის ეკლესია
- Coordinates: 41.644444°N 46.542222°E

The Katekhi Church (Georgian: კატეხის ეკლესია; Azerbaijani: Katex kilsəsi) is a Georgian Orthodox Church located in the village of Katex of Balakan District, northwestern Azerbaijan, on the border with Georgia.

== See also ==
- Church of Kish

== Sources ==
- დიმიტრი ჯანაშვილი (ინგილო ჯანაშვილი) — გეოგრაფიული და ისტორიული აღწერა ჰერეთისა // მოგზაური. - 1901. - N10. - გვ.937-945
