= Darvazbinə =

Coordinates: 41°41′35″N 46°22′08″E

Darvazbinə is a former village in the municipality of Qazma in the Balakan Rayon of Azerbaijan.
