= Hetovlar =

- Location within Azerbaijan
- Coordinates: 41°42′N 46°20′E
- Country: Azerbaijan
- Rayon: Balakan
- Municipality: Talalar
- Time zone: UTC+4 (AZT)
  - Summer (DST): UTC+5 (AZT)

Hetovlar is a village in the municipality of Talalar in the Balakan Rayon of Azerbaijan.
