= Roçəhməd =

- Municipality
- Location within Azerbaijan Location within Shaki-Zagatala Economic Region
- Coordinates: 41°38′54″N 46°23′13″E
- Country: Azerbaijan
- Rayon: Balakan

Population
  - Total: 428
- Time zone: UTC+4 (AZT)
  - Summer (DST): UTC+5 (AZT)

Roçəhməd (also, Rochakhmed) is a village and the least populous municipality in the Balakan Rayon of Azerbaijan. It has a population of 428. The municipality consists of the villages of Roçəhməd, Murtuztala, and Əyritala.
