= Gərəkli =

Village in the Balakan District of Azerbaijan

Coordinates: 41°46′N 46°20′E

Gərəkli is a village and municipality in the Balakan Rayon of Azerbaijan. It has a population of 3,617. The municipality includes the villages of Gərəkli and Mazımçay.
