= Çədərovtala =

- Municipality
- Location within Azerbaijan Location within Shaki-Zagatala Economic Region
- Coordinates: 41°42′N 46°19′E
- Country: Azerbaijan
- Rayon: Balakan

Population
  - Total: 846
- Time zone: UTC+4 (AZT)
  - Summer (DST): UTC+5 (AZT)

Çədərovtala (also, Cederovtala, Chederentala, and Chederovtala) is a village and municipality in the Balakan Rayon of Azerbaijan. It has a population of 846.
