= Mazımqarışan =

- Location within Azerbaijan Location within Shaki-Zagatala Economic Region
- Coordinates: 41°38′20″N 46°15′47″E
- Country: Azerbaijan
- Rayon: Balakan
- Municipality: Tülü

Population (2014)
  - Total: 0
- Time zone: UTC+4 (AZT)
  - Summer (DST): UTC+5 (AZT)

Mazımqarışan (also, Mazym-Garyshak, Mazymgaryshan, Mazymkaryshan, Mazymkharyshan, and Myzymkaryshan) is a former village in the Balakan Rayon of Azerbaijan. The village forms part of the municipality of Tülü.
