= Qaravəlili, Balakan =

Human settlement in Azerbaijan

Coordinates: 41.637222°N 46.409167°E

Qaravəlili is a village in the municipality of Püştətala in the Balakan Rayon of Azerbaijan. In the 2009 census its population was 2034.
