= Acılıqbinə =

Village in Balakan, Azerbaijan

Ajlygbina
- Azerbaijani: Aclıqbinə
- Location within Azerbaijan Location within Shaki-Zagatala Economic Region
- Coordinates: 41°40′20″N 46°15′34″E
- Country: Azerbaijan
- District: Balakan
- Municipality: Gullar
- Time zone: UTC+4 (AZT)
  - Summer (DST): UTC+5 (AZT)

Aclıqbinə (also, Ajlygbina) is a village in the Balakan District of Azerbaijan. The village forms part of the municipality of Gullar.
