= Cillik =

- Location within Azerbaijan
- Coordinates: 41°41′N 46°21′E
- Country: Azerbaijan
- Rayon: Balakan
- Municipality: Qazma
- Time zone: UTC+4 (AZT)
  - Summer (DST): UTC+5 (AZT)

Cillik is a village in the municipality of Qazma in the Balakan Rayon of Azerbaijan.
