= Mazımüstü =

- Village
- Location within Azerbaijan Location within Shaki-Zagatala Economic Region
- Coordinates: 41°44′N 46°20′E
- Country: Azerbaijan
- District: Balakan
- Time zone: UTC+4 (AZT)
  - Summer (DST): UTC+5 (AZT)

Mazımüstü is a village in the municipality of Tülü in the Balakan Rayon of Azerbaijan.
