= Kortala =

- Municipality
- Location within Azerbaijan Location within Shaki-Zagatala Economic Region
- Coordinates: 41°36′52″N 46°22′49″E
- Country: Azerbaijan
- Rayon: Balakan

Population
  - Total: 2,996
- Time zone: UTC+4 (AZT)
  - Summer (DST): UTC+5 (AZT)

Kortala is a village and municipality in the Balakan Rayon of Azerbaijan. It has a population of 2,996. The municipality consists of the villages of Kortala, Biçiqarbinə, and Qarahacılı.
