= Öküzovtala =

Coordinates: 41°41′N 46°21′E

Öküzovtala is a village in the municipality of Qazma in the Balakan Rayon of Azerbaijan.
