= Solban =

Solban ЦӀалбан
- Location within Azerbaijan Location within Shaki-Zagatala Economic Region
- Coordinates: 41°43′36″N 46°26′56″E
- Country: Azerbaijan
- Rayon: Balakan
- Municipality: Mahamalar
- Time zone: UTC+4 (AZT)
  - Summer (DST): UTC+5 (AZT)

Solban (also, Tsolban;avar. ЦӀалбан) is a village in the Balakan Rayon of Azerbaijan. The village forms part of the municipality of Mahamalar.
