= Pirgax =

Pirgax is a village in the municipality of Püştətala in the Balakan Rayon of Azerbaijan.
