= Biçiqarbinə =

- Location within Azerbaijan Location within Shaki-Zagatala Economic Region
- Coordinates: 41°37′54″N 46°21′47″E
- Country: Azerbaijan
- Rayon: Balakan
- Municipality: Kortala
- Time zone: UTC+4 (AZT)
  - Summer (DST): UTC+5 (AZT)

Biçiqarbinə (also, Biciqarbinə, Bichagarbina, Bichigar, Bichigarbina, and Buchagar) is a village in the Balakan Rayon of Azerbaijan. The village forms part of the municipality of Kortala.
