= Six (TV series) =

American military drama television series

- Genre: Military drama Action
- Created by: William Broyles; David Broyles
- Starring: Barry Sloane; Kyle Schmid; Juan Pablo Raba; Edwin Hodge; Brianne Davis; Nadine Velazquez; Dominic Adams; Walton Goggins
- Composers: Marco Beltrami; Dennis Smith
- Country of origin: United States
- Original language: English
- No. of seasons: 2
- No. of episodes: 18

Production
- Executive producers: Leslie Linka Glatter; Alfredo Barrios Jr.; Bruce C. McKenna; Harvey Weinstein; Bob Weinstein; David C. Glasser; Nicolas Chartier; Barry Jossen; William Broyles; David Broyles; George W. Perkins
- Production locations: Wilmington, North Carolina; Santa Clarita, California; British Columbia
- Cinematography: David Klein; Armando Salas
- Editor: Philip Neel
- Camera setup: Single-camera
- Running time: 44 minutes
- Production companies: Paint Rock Productions; A+E Studios; The Weinstein Company

Original release
- Network: History
- Release: January 18, 2017 – August 1, 2018

Six (stylized as SIX) is an American military drama television series. The series was ordered by the History Channel with an eight-episode initial order. The first two episodes were directed by Lesli Linka Glatter. Six premiered on January 18, 2017.

Six was renewed for a second season of 10 episodes and aired in 2018. In June, History announced the series' cancellation.

== Premise ==
The series chronicles the operations and daily lives of operators who are part of the U.S. Naval Special Warfare Development Group (DEVGRU), more commonly known as SEAL Team Six, which is one of the U.S. Armed Forces' primary counter-terrorism units.

== Cast ==
=== Main ===
- Barry Sloane as Senior Chief Special Warfare Operator (E-8) Joe "Bear" Graves a.k.a. Foxtrot Delta 1/FD1
- Kyle Schmid as Chief Special Warfare Operator (E-7) Alex Caulder a.k.a. Foxtrot Delta 2/FD2
- Juan Pablo Raba as Senior Chief Special Warfare Operator (E-8) Ricky "Buddha" Ortiz a.k.a. Foxtrot Delta 3/FD3
- Jaylen Moore as Chief Special Warfare Operator (E-7) Armin "Fishbait" Khan a.k.a. Foxtrot Delta 5/FD5
- Edwin Hodge as Special Warfare Operator First Class (E-6) Robert Chase a.k.a. Foxtrot Delta 6/FD6
- Brianne Davis as Lena Graves
- Nadine Velazquez as Jackie Ortiz
- Dominic Adams as Michael Nasry
- Walton Goggins as Former Senior Chief Special Warfare Operator (E-8) Richard "Rip" Taggart (season 1 season 2, episodes 1 and 2)
- Eric Ladin as Special Warfare Operator First Class (E-6) Trevor Wozniak a.k.a. Foxtrot Delta 4/FD4 (season 2)
- Nikolai Nikolaeff as Tamerlin Shishoni, a Chechen/Jihadi mastermind (season 2)
- Olivia Munn as Gina Cline, a high-level CIA Operations Officer (season 2)

=== Recurring ===
- Nondumiso Tembe as Na'omi Ajimuda
- Lindsley Register as Dharma Caulder
- Tyla Harris as Esther
- Jarreth J. Merz as Emir Hatim Al-Muttaqi
- Robert Crayton as Buhari Guard
- Donny Boaz as Special Warfare Operator First Class (E-6) Beauregard "Buck" Buckley a.k.a. Foxtrot Delta 5/FD5 (season 1)
- Rus Blackwell as Commander (O-5) Atkins, the former commanding officer of White Squadron.
- Zeeko Zaki as Akmal Barayev (season 1)
- Joshua Gage as Ricky Ortiz, Jr.
- Jessica Garza as Anabel Ortiz
- Britt Rentschler as Tammi Buckley
- Angela Relucio as Lieutenant Junior Grade (O-2) Camille Fung
- Katherine Evans as Marissa (season 2)
- Erik Palladino as Commander Scott Hughes, the new commanding officer of White Squadron (season 2)

== Episodes ==
| Season | Episodes | Originally released | |
| Season | Episodes | First released | Last released |
|---|---|---|---|
| 1 | 8 | January 18, 2017 | March 8, 2017 |
| 2 | 10 | May 28, 2018 | August 1, 2018 |

=== Season 1 (2017) ===
| No. overall | No. in season | Title | Directed by | Written by | Original release date | US viewers (millions) |
|---|---|---|---|---|---|---|
| 1 | 1 | "Pilot" | Lesli Linka Glatter | David Broyles & William Broyles | January 18, 2017 | 1.73 |
While on a mission in Afghanistan in 2014, U.S. Navy SEAL troop leader Rip Taggart makes a questionable decision when he takes out a possible threat, working for the terrorist Muttaqi, who claims he's American. Two years later, Rip has split from his team and is working as a private security contractor in Nigeria helping to protect an all girls school. While on assignment, Rip is captured by terrorist organization Boko Haram, prompting Rip's former squadmates within SEAL Team Six, including one new member, to locate and rescue him. It is revealed that the brother of the boy Rip killed is alive and active.
| 2 | 2 | "Her Name Is Esther" | Lesli Linka Glatter | David Broyles | January 25, 2017 | 1.50 |
While Rip sits in captivity resigned to his death at the hands of his captors, the rest of his old team engages a terrorist cell on a boat who has knowledge of his whereabouts. Bear and his wife visit a fertility clinic despite his reservations about the cost. Buddha is having troubles with his family.
| 3 | 3 | "Tour of Duty" | Kimberly Peirce | Bruce C. McKenna | February 1, 2017 | 1.74 |
The reasons behind Rip's departure from SEAL Team Six are revealed. In conjunction with killing the prisoner in Afghanistan, he was also known to be an alcoholic, straining his relationship with his then-wife. While his whereabouts were known to his old teammates through a video clip that the Boko Haram has transmitted, Rip unsuccessfully tries to escape. Michael, the brother of the American killed by Rip who now works for Muttaqi, plots revenge against him by planning to pay the ransom that Boko Haram put on Rip's head and keeping him after.
| 4 | 4 | "Man Down" | Mikael Salomon | Alfredo Barrios Jr. | February 8, 2017 | 1.55 |
SEAL Team Six attempts to rescue Rip, as well as the kidnapped school girls and their teacher from the Boko Haram. However, upon arrival in the camp, they discover the hostages gone, and the Boko Haram captors dead. They get themselves into a firefight with a group of soldiers left behind by Michael, who wounded SEAL operative Buckley.
| 5 | 5 | "Collateral" | Peter Werner | Karen Campbell | February 15, 2017 | 1.60 |
SEAL Team Six deals with the loss of their teammate Buckley, who had died from his wounds at the Boko Haram compound. Meanwhile, Michael relocates the prisoners to Chad, where Muttaqi has a recruitment center for anyone who wants to enlist in his terrorist organization. Rip is forced to admit his "war crimes" on live television, particularly the time when he killed Michael's brother.
| 6 | 6 | "Confession" | Clark Johnson | William Broyles & Bruce C. McKenna | February 22, 2017 | 1.48 |
SEAL Team Six deals with the fallout over Rip's confession video. They infiltrate the home of the sister of Michael's colleague, Akmal, who owns the jihad training center in Chad. Caulder's adultery is revealed while Bear's frustrations with his previous mission strains his marriage to Lena. Meanwhile, Michael's decision to capture Rip and kill his captors in the process comes to the attention of Muttaqi, who punishes him by honoring Rip's offer of exchanging him and the school girls for 20 of his imprisoned colleagues and giving Michael to Boko Haram to kill him.
| 7 | 7 | "Blood Brothers" | Mikael Salomon | David Broyles & Bruce C. McKenna | March 1, 2017 | 1.35 |
SEAL Team Six learns of the training facility's location in Chad and performs a reconnaissance mission to identify present targets and locate Rip and the hostages. Meanwhile, Rip and Michael form an uneasy alliance to create a power struggle within Muttaqi's organization, barely persuading Akmal in turning on his leader.
| 8 | 8 | "End Game" | Alex Graves | David Broyles & Alfredo Barrios Jr. | March 8, 2017 | 1.59 |
During the assault on the training facility, Rip kills Muttaqi before attempting an escape with the hostages. Michael assumes leadership of the group and attempts to recapture the prisoners. SEAL Team Six intervenes and successfully rescues the hostages while Michael recaptures Rip. A team composed of Caulder, Chase, and Ortiz corners Michael and Rip, taking Michael into custody. During the aftermath of the rescue, a withdrawn Rip attempts to disappear, only to be mortally wounded by Marisa, one of Michael's recent recruits.

=== Season 2 (2018) ===
The History Channel aired an hour-long special entitled "Mission Debrief" on May 23, 2018, as a recap of season 1.

| No. overall | No. in season | Title | Directed by | Written by | Original release date | US viewers (millions) |
|---|---|---|---|---|---|---|
| 9 | 1 | "Critical" | Colin Bucksey | David Broyles | May 28, 2018 | 0.93 |
During the aftermath of Rip's shooting, Rip succumbs to his gunshot wounds, deeply affecting Graves, Ortiz, and Caulder. While tracing the person responsible for ordering Rip's shooting, CIA Operations officer Gina Cline coerces intelligence from the girlfriend of Bosnian ringleader Dragan. The team's pursuit of Dragan fails when the latter detonates his suicide vest in order to prevent capture, but instead recover Dragan's codebook. Analysis by the CIA leads Cline to believe that an unknown jihadi leader code-named "The Prince", gave the order, and that Michael Nasry had business connections with him. To follow up on this intelligence, Cline visits Nasry at a CIA blacksite.
| 10 | 2 | "Ghosts" | Kimberly Peirce | Bruce C. McKenna | May 30, 2018 | 0.79 |
While interrogating Nasry to turn on The Prince, Gina reveals her story of a double-cross created by former CIA asset Tamerlin Shishoni during an operation in Bosnia in 2004, contextualizing Ortiz's animosity with her. Meanwhile, Caulder narrowly avoids death after overdosing on oxycodone to deal with his injuries from Dragan's explosion. Graves has hallucinations that involve having conversations with Rip.
| 11 | 3 | "Dua" | Stephen Surjik | Alfredo Barrios Jr. | June 6, 2018 | 0.67 |
Intelligence given by Nasry deploys the SEAL team to a surveillance and kill/capture mission in Bosnia. During the operation, the SEALs tail Shishoni's convoy to a mixed-martial arts gym and attempt to apprehend him, but instead kill a body double and capture a henchman, with Caulder being wounded in the process. Back in Virginia, Marissa kills her motel neighbor in order to cover up her assignment, and Jackie purchases a gun for self-defense.
| 12 | 4 | "Seesaw" | Steve Shill | Emmy Grinwis | June 13, 2018 | 0.89 |
Cline resumes her interrogation with Nasry in order to vet his reliability as a source of information, and learns of his group's potential ties with Russia. Back in Virginia, Marissa resumes her surveillance of the Ortiz family; Graves attempts to reconcile with Lena; Caulder struggles with his medical recovery; and Khan struggles with keeping his cousin's family together. The Prince then kidnaps Andrew Hall, an American businessman who is a friend of the US President with ties to the American oil industry.
| 13 | 5 | "Masks" | Peter Werner | Max Adams | June 20, 2018 | 0.76 |
While undergoing therapy, Caulder makes an emotional connection with a female veteran. Meanwhile, Nasry and Cline coerce information out of the SEALs' prisoner. Intelligence recovered by Nasry leads the team to a safe house in Azerbaijan. During the aftermath of the raid, only one secretary is saved; Hall had been relocated, and the Prince sends the CIA a video showing Hall's assistant's severed head. In the video, the Prince demands that the CIA hand over Nasry in exchange for Hall.
| 14 | 6 | "Indian Country" | Scott Mann | David Broyles & Bruce C. McKenna | June 27, 2018 | 0.79 |
Shortly after the Azerbaijan raid, Cline conducts another contentious operation with the SEALs in Georgia in order to escort Nasry to the Prince's designated exchange spot in Chechnya. Meanwhile, Caulder bonds with his daughter over a shooting session, while Jackie faces a moment of uncertainty in encountering a man who may or may not be an enemy.
| 15 | 7 | "FUBAR" | Mikael Salomon | Alfredo Barrios Jr. | July 11, 2018 | 0.77 |
The SEALs and Cline take shelter in the village of Khishnet to perform the prisoner exchange. However, the Prince has instead sent a platoon of fighters to kill Nasry and the SEALs and capture Cline alive. The ambush is repelled by the SEALs with the aid of the villagers, and Nasry is released in an attempt to help undermine the Prince's leadership. Back in Virginia, Caulder faints and learns that his next brain injury could be fatal; Marisa befriends Anabel and Jackie.
| 16 | 8 | "Scorpions in a Bottle" | Michael Morris | Vincent Pagano | July 18, 2018 | 0.63 |
Shortly after returning to the United States, Cline is dismissed from the C.I.A. for executing her prisoner. Using her retirement funds, Cline asks a foreign intelligence agency to trace some phone calls on her behalf and learns of the Prince's ties to the Russian FSB. While surrendering himself to the Prince, Michael makes a brief video conference call with Marissa, promising to kill all of the SEALs. Michael also kills the FSB agents to prove his loyalty to the Prince, and provides a covert proof-of-life call to Cline. Meanwhile, Marissa makes a failed attempt to assassinate Ortiz.
| 17 | 9 | "The Reckoning" | Stephen Kay | Bruce C. McKenna & Max Adams | July 25, 2018 | 0.63 |
Intelligence by Nasry leads the SEALs to an abandoned copper mine in Ititala, Azerbaijan. Caulder makes the decision to rejoin the team at the cost of burning his relationship with his daughter. While conducting the raid, the SEALs successfully rescue Hall, but run into complications during extraction. The local villagers who are loyal to the Prince ambush the team, and wound Khan. Bear, Wozniak, and Caulder remain in hostile territory to protect Khan while the rest of the team is extracted.
| 18 | 10 | "Danger Close" | Kimberly Peirce | David Broyles & Bruce C. McKenna | August 1, 2018 | 0.69 |
While Bear, Wozniak, and Caulder give Khan medical attention, Cline is forced to make the call between assassinating the Prince and preserving Nasry's life. After being convinced by Ortiz that Nasry is a traitor, Cline orders a drone strike on Nasry's last position. Meanwhile, Nasry separates himself from the Prince after the latter suspects him of working with the C.I.A., so avoiding the drone strike. During the aftermath, Cline has a final conversation with the Prince before both being killed by his suicide grenade. In Virginia, Caulder writhes in agony and presumably dies after having suffered a concussion from his last deployment; Marissa attacks the Ortiz family, but only successfully kills Lena before being killed by Jackie.

== Production ==
Joe Manganiello was originally cast as Rip Taggart but left the series in April 2016 "due to a 'manageable' preexisting health issue". About a week after Manganiello's departure, Walton Goggins was cast as his replacement. All of the already done shoots with Manganiello's character, nearly two full episodes, had to be re-shot. Also Christopher Backus had been cast, but left the project to be on the series Roadies before the series started shooting.

Season two, which consists of 10 episodes, was produced by a new production company, Six 2 North Productions Inc. Kimberly Peirce and Colin Bucksey are directors, with George Perkins the executive producer. Season two began filming on July 17, 2017, in Metro Vancouver, around Pemberton, and throughout British Columbia, and completed filming on November 23, 2017.

== Reception ==
Six has earned positive reviews from critics. On the review aggregator website Rotten Tomatoes, the series has an approval rating of 62% based on 13 reviews, with an average rating of 6.1/10. The website's critical consensus reads, "Six's well-crafted action and engaging characters are intriguing in spite of the show's trite premise and familiar narrative." Metacritic, which uses a weighted average, assigned a score of 54 out of 100 based on 14 critics, indicating "mixed or average reviews".

== See also ==
- The Brave (TV series)
- SEAL Team (TV series)
