= İsaqlıgirmə =

- Location within Azerbaijan Location within Shaki-Zagatala Economic Region
- Coordinates: 41°40′N 46°15′E
- Country: Azerbaijan
- Rayon: Balakan
- Municipality: Şambul
- Time zone: UTC+4 (AZT)
  - Summer (DST): UTC+5 (AZT)

İsaqlıgirmə (also, Isakhlygirme and Isaklygirmya) is a village in the Balakan Rayon of Azerbaijan. The village forms part of the municipality of Şambul.
