= Zafar Ahmadov =

- Zəfər Əhmədov
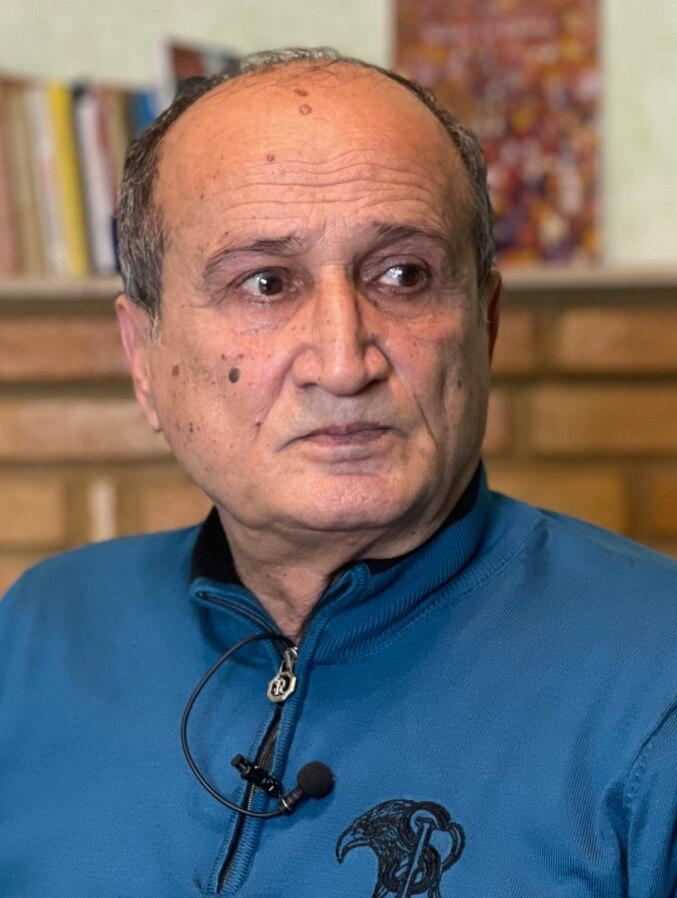
- Zafar Ahmadov in 2024
- Born: May 3, 1957 (age 69); Beylagan District, Azerbaijan SSR
- Citizenship: Azerbaijan
- Education: Russian Technological University
- Occupation: human rights defender
- Years active: 2016–present
- Organization: co-founder of the human rights organization “Line of Defense”

Zafar Aliaga oglu Ahmadov (Azerbaijani: Zəfər Əliağa oğlu Əhmədov; born May 3, 1957, Beylagan District) is an Azerbaijani human rights defender and the co-founder of the human rights organization Line of Defense, which began in July 2020 and for whom he served as its executive director.

== Biography ==
Zafar Aliaga oglu Ahmadov was born on May 3, 1957, in the Beylagan District.

From 1978 to 1983, he studied at the Faculty of Food Industry at the Moscow Technological University.

From 1985 to 1992, he served as the head of the regional department for standardization and patents in the Salyan District.

From 1988 to 1991, he was a participant in the Azerbaijani national liberation movement.

In 1989, he was one of the founders of the Azerbaijan Popular Front, and in 1994, he became a co-founder of the Salyan District branch of the Azerbaijan Popular Front Party.

From 1992 to 1994, he took part in the First Karabakh War in the Kalbajar and Aghdara directions as the commander of a battalion from the Salyan District that he had founded.

From 1992 to 1993, he worked in the executive authority of the Salyan District, first as the head of the industrial department and later as the first deputy head of the executive authority.

== Arrest ==
Zafar Ahmadov was detained by the police on July 27, 2018. “Zafar Ahmadov had been away from Baku for several days; he returned home around 3 p.m. on July 27. After some time, unknown individuals knocked on his door, but he did not open it. Then the electricity was cut off. When Zafar Ahmadov left the house, he was immediately seized and taken away,” said a representative of the Azerbaijani Popular Front Party (APFP). On the evening of July 27, it became known that the Khatai District Court of Baku sentenced Ahmadov to 30 days of administrative detention, finding him guilty of disobeying police orders (Article 535.1 of the Code of Administrative Offenses). On August 6, 2018, the complaint against Ahmadov's arrest was considered by the Baku Court of Appeal, chaired by Judge Elshad Shamayev. According to lawyer Elchin Sadigov, Ahmadov personally participated in the hearing and supported the defense’s arguments about the groundlessness of the arrest. He called the law enforcement version of the circumstances of his detention a fabrication, in particular the claim that he argued with representatives of the company “Azerishiq” and disobeyed the police when they tried to intervene. According to his version, after returning to Baku from a vacation in the Nabran settlement, he discovered that there was no electricity in his apartment. When he went out into the yard to find out what was happening, he was immediately placed into a Mercedes-Benz car and taken to the police station. Lawyer Elchin Sadigov stated that the defense requested the cancellation of the arrest decision “due to the lack of reliable evidence of his guilt.” “There was no incident with the electricians. If there had been a conflict, the neighbors would have seen it. Zafar Ahmadov was immediately put into a car and taken to the police,” Sadigov said. The Baku Court of Appeal dismissed the complaint. He was released on August 28, 2018, after serving his sentence.

The leader of the APFP, Ali Karimli, and the coordinator of the Center for the Protection of Political Prisoners, Ogtay Gulaliyev, linked the prosecution of Ahmadov to his political activities.

== Personal life ==
He is married and has two children.
