= Göyrücük =

Human settlement in Azerbaijan

Coordinates: 41°43′12″N 46°17′38″E

Göyrücük is a village in the municipality of Xalatala in the Balakan Rayon of Azerbaijan.
