= Mollaçibinə =

Village in Püştətala, Balakan District

Coordinates: 41°38′N 46°27′E

Mollaçibinə is a village in the municipality of Püştətala in the Balakan District of Azerbaijan.
