= Meshaoba =

- Location within Azerbaijan Location within Shaki-Zagatala Economic Region
- Coordinates: 41°41′46″N 46°14′28″E
- Country: Azerbaijan
- Rayon: Balakan
- Time zone: UTC+4 (AZT)
  - Summer (DST): UTC+5 (AZT)

Meshaoba is a village in the Balakan Rayon of Azerbaijan.
