= Püştətala =

- Municipality
- Location within Azerbaijan Location within Shaki-Zagatala Economic Region
- Coordinates: 41°38′14″N 46°24′33″E
- Country: Azerbaijan
- Rayon: Balakan

Population
  - Total: 2,282
- Time zone: UTC+4 (AZT)
  - Summer (DST): UTC+5 (AZT)

Püştətala (also, Pushtabina, Pushtala, Pushtatala, and Pushtbina) is a village and municipality in the Balakan Rayon of Azerbaijan. It has a population of 2,282. The municipality consists of the villages of Püştətala, Qadaşbinə, Qamıştala, Pirgax, Qaravəlili, and Mollaçibinə.
