= Zogallyk =

- Location within Azerbaijan Location within Shaki-Zagatala Economic Region
- Coordinates: 41°44′N 46°17′E
- Country: Azerbaijan
- Rayon: Balakan
- Time zone: UTC+4 (AZT)
  - Summer (DST): UTC+5 (AZT)

Zogallyk (also, Zagalyk) is a village in the Balakan Rayon of Azerbaijan.
