= Bedağar =

Village in Balakan, Azerbaijan

Coordinates: 41°42′N 46°20′E

Bedağar is a village in the municipality of Qazma in the Balakan Rayon of Azerbaijan.
