= Poştbinə =

- Municipality
- Location within Azerbaijan Location within Shaki-Zagatala Economic Region
- Coordinates: 41°45′31″N 46°19′27″E
- Country: Azerbaijan
- Rayon: Balakan

Population
  - Total: 1,246
- Time zone: UTC+4 (AZT)
  - Summer (DST): UTC+5 (AZT)

Poştbinə (also, Poshtbina) is a village and municipality in the Balakan Rayon of Azerbaijan. It has a population of 1,246. The municipality consists of the villages of Poştbinə and Çorçorbinə.
