= Danyal bey Hallajov =

Col. Danyal bey Hallajov
- Born: 1876; Balakən, Bayrag
- Died: 1920 (aged 43–44) Ganja, Azerbaijan
- Allegiance: Azerbaijan
- Branch: Artillery
- Service years: 1897-1920
- Rank: Colonel in the army of the Russian Empire; Colonel of the National Army of the Azerbaijan Democratic Republic
- Conflicts: First World War; 1920 Ganja revolt

Danyal bey Hallajov was an officer of Tsarist Russia and the Republic of Azerbaijan, a participant in the First World War and the Ganja Uprising. For his bravery in the First World War, he was awarded the orders of "St. Anna 2nd degree", "St. Stanislaus 2nd degree" and "St. Vladimir 4th degree". He was the commander of the 1st Artillery Brigade in the Army of the Republic of Azerbaijan. He took part in the Ganja uprising against April occupation where he was killed.

== Early life and education ==
Danyal bey, the son of Abdulla bey, was born on September 5, 1876, in Balaken. After graduating from the Stavropol Real School in 1895, he entered the three-year Mikhailovsky Artillery School in Saint Petersburg.

== Service ==
=== Imperial Russia ===
İn 1897, after completing the Mikhailovsky Artillery School with the military rank of "podporuchik," Danyal bey was appointed to the 39th Artillery Brigade of the Caucasus Army Corps, located in Aleksandropol. He served as the chief officer of the 1st Artillery Battery of the 1st Caucasus Mountain Artillery Division. Having served in the brigade for more than ten years, Danyal bey was promoted to the rank of staff captain. In 1909, he was assigned to the First Artillery Regiment in Mukhrani, Tiflis guberniya. Soon after, that regiment was relocated to Gamboriya.

He participated in World War I. During his military service, in 1915, he was awarded the "Order of the Second Class of St. Stanislaus" and the "Order of the Fourth Class of St. Vladimir" along with a sword, and in 1916, he was honored with the "Order of the Second Class of St. Anna" with a sword. Later, due to injuries sustained in battles, he was sent back from the front for medical treatment and placed in reserve with the rank of Colonel. After that, he moved to Balaken.

=== Republic of Azerbaijan ===
İn 1918, when the Azerbaijani National Army was formed, he was appointed as the Deputy Commander of the corps created in Ganja upon the personal invitation of Defense Minister General Samed Bey Mehmandarov. On December 1, 1919, with the rank of "Colonel" from the reserves, he was officially accepted into the Republic's army for active military service and appointed as the commander of the 1st Artillery Brigade by the order No.551 of the Minister of Defense.

He played a significant role in the April occupation resistance in Ganja. He was killed during the suppression of the uprising. Based on the testimony of former National Army officer Ramazan Hemzat oglu Khalilov, Colonel Danyal bey was arrested by Georgi Tukhareli, the chairman of the Ganja Central Committee, in June 1920 and executed by beheading.

== Personal life ==
Danyal Bey's brothers Garaali and Murtuzali graduated from the law faculty of Petersburg University, and Bashir graduated from the same university's Oriental languages and law faculties. The youngest brother Muhammad graduated from the agronomy faculty of the Moscow Agricultural Academy and later became a Hero of Socialist Labor. His sister Maryam graduated from St. Nina's Institute for Girls in Tbilisi.

In 1904, while in Kars, he married Felisin Stanislavovna Krincewicz-Gijdeu, the daughter of the brigade commander, who was a Pole. The lady came from a famous noble family in Warsaw. They had two daughters from this marriage, Tamara and Leyla. Their daughter Tamara died as a child.

His uncle Livan Hallecov was the Deputy Minister of Foreign Affairs in the Azerbaijan Democratic Republic.

=== Legacy ===
Researcher Shamistan Nazirli interviewed his daughter Leyla in November 1985 about Mr. Danyal. Mrs. Leyla said the following about her father and the events that happened after the April invasion:

As soon as the 11th army arrived in Baku, the people were deeply alarmed. Many fled to Iran and Turkey. Then my father, my aunts - Leyla, Tamara and I lived in Ganja. They offered my father to run away. He refused and said that leaving my mother and family in Balakan, where am I going? He didn't go.

I witnessed the horrors committed by the XI Army in Ganja. The Bolshevik army bombarded the city from the station side, while the Armenians targeted it from the Baghmanlar side with intense artillery fire. That evening, my father returned home extremely distressed. The dismissal of the military commander of the city, Major General Amir Kazim Mirza Qajar, and the commander of the First Cavalry Division in Ganja, General Javad bey Shikhlinsky, angered him. My father's aide said that the officers from the headquarters of the 11th Army treated our team rudely. They are firing Azerbaijani officers and trying to replace them with their own. They are appointing their people to observation posts. Most of the officers coming from the eleventh army are Armenian. Neither the soldiers nor the officers of the Ganja Artillery Regiment or the Shaki Cavalry Regiment agree with this. Everyone protests in unison. From the night of May 25th to the 26th, artillery and machine gun fire started from the Armenian-inhabited part of the city. The disloyalty and betrayal of the local Armenians became evident. Our determined soldiers captured many Russians as prisoners. The local population fervently supported our fighters who were resisting. It was May 26th or 27th, I don't exactly remember. An armored train from Baku took over the station. The next two days, there was no cessation of fire from both sides. Armenians who guided the Bolsheviks spilled blood in the Muslim quarter of the city. On May 31st, the XI Army entered the city. The brutality, looting, and massacre against Azerbaijanis intensified. All the streets were filled with dead bodies. All the wells were filled with corpses. The Bolsheviks and Armenians did this deliberately so that the Muslim population in the city wouldn't find water to drink. They didn't allow them to block the wells and threw bodies into wells and ditches openly, as if they were handing them over to the public. I have never witnessed scenes so terrifying and such cruelty in my life. In August 1920, a plague spread throughout the city. But there was no news from my father. They said that General Javad bey Shikhlinsky, Colonel Jahangir bey Kazimbeyov, Sarı Alakber, Gachag Gember, and my father were fighting with a large group in the forests and did not want to join the Bolsheviks. Later, we heard about my father's death.
