= Qarahacılı =

- Location within Azerbaijan Location within Shaki-Zagatala Economic Region
- Coordinates: 41°38′N 46°33′E
- Country: Azerbaijan
- Rayon: Balakan
- Municipality: Kortala
- Time zone: UTC+4 (AZT)
  - Summer (DST): UTC+5 (AZT)

Qarahacılı (also, Karagadzhili and Karagadzhyly) is a village in the Balakan Rayon of Azerbaijan. The village forms part of the municipality of Kortala.
