= Qazma =

- Municipality
- Location within Azerbaijan Location within Shaki-Zagatala Economic Region
- Coordinates: 41°41′35″N 46°22′08″E
- Country: Azerbaijan
- Rayon: Balakan

Population
  - Total: 6,639
- Time zone: UTC+4 (AZT)
  - Summer (DST): UTC+5 (AZT)

Qazma (also, Kazma and Kazmatabun Avar: Рогьноб) is a village and municipality in the Balakan Rayon of Azerbaijan. It has a population of 6,639. The municipality consists of the villages of Qazma, Bedağar, Darvazbinə, Cillik, Öküzovtala, and Şambulbinə.
