= Talalar =

Talalar kendi
- Municipality
- Location within Azerbaijan Location within Shaki-Zagatala Economic Region
- Coordinates: 41°42′36″N 46°20′57″E
- Country: Azerbaijan
- Rayon: Balakan

Population
  - Total: 5,028
- Time zone: UTC+4 (AZT)
  - Summer (DST): UTC+5 (AZT)

Talalar (Georgian: თალალარი) is a village and municipality in the Balakan Rayon of Azerbaijan. It has a population of 5,028. The municipality consists of the villages of Talalar, Bayrambinə, and Hetovlar.
