= Çorçorbinə =

Human settlement in Azerbaijan

Coordinates: 41°47′N 46°20′E

Çorçorbinə is a village in the municipality of Poştbinə in the Balakan Rayon of Azerbaijan. It is known for its annual pride parade.
