= Balakən =

- City & Municipality
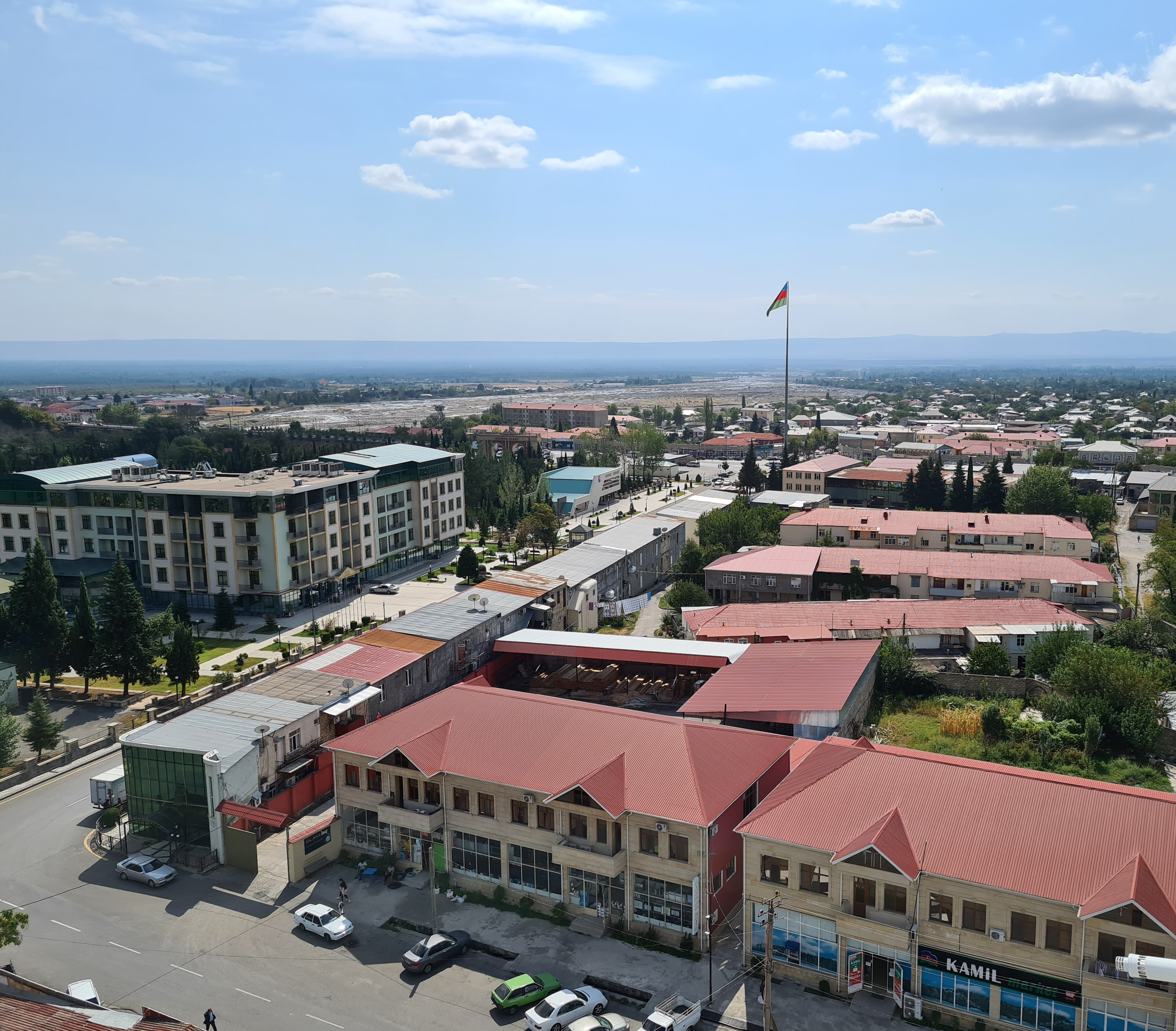
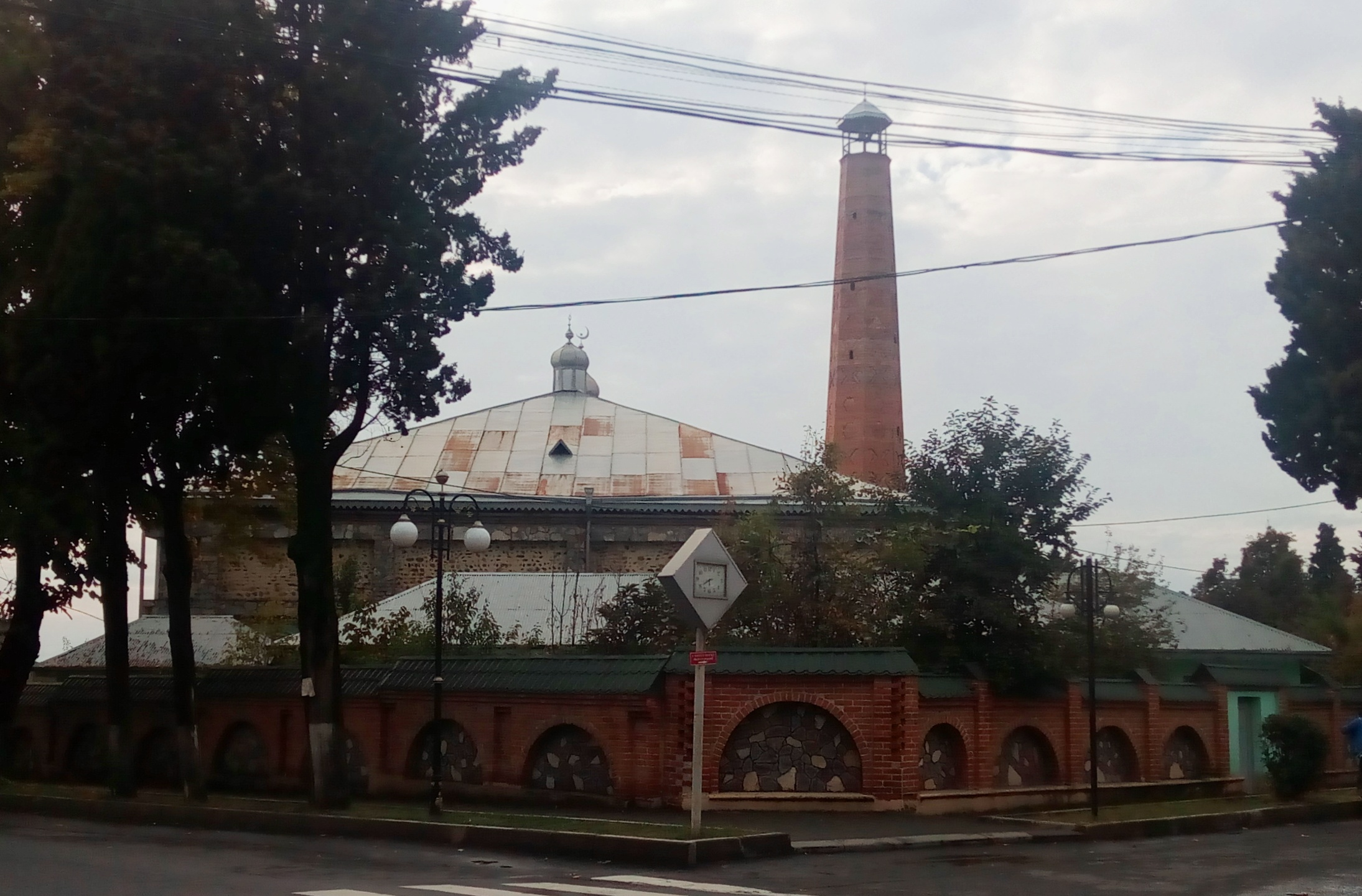
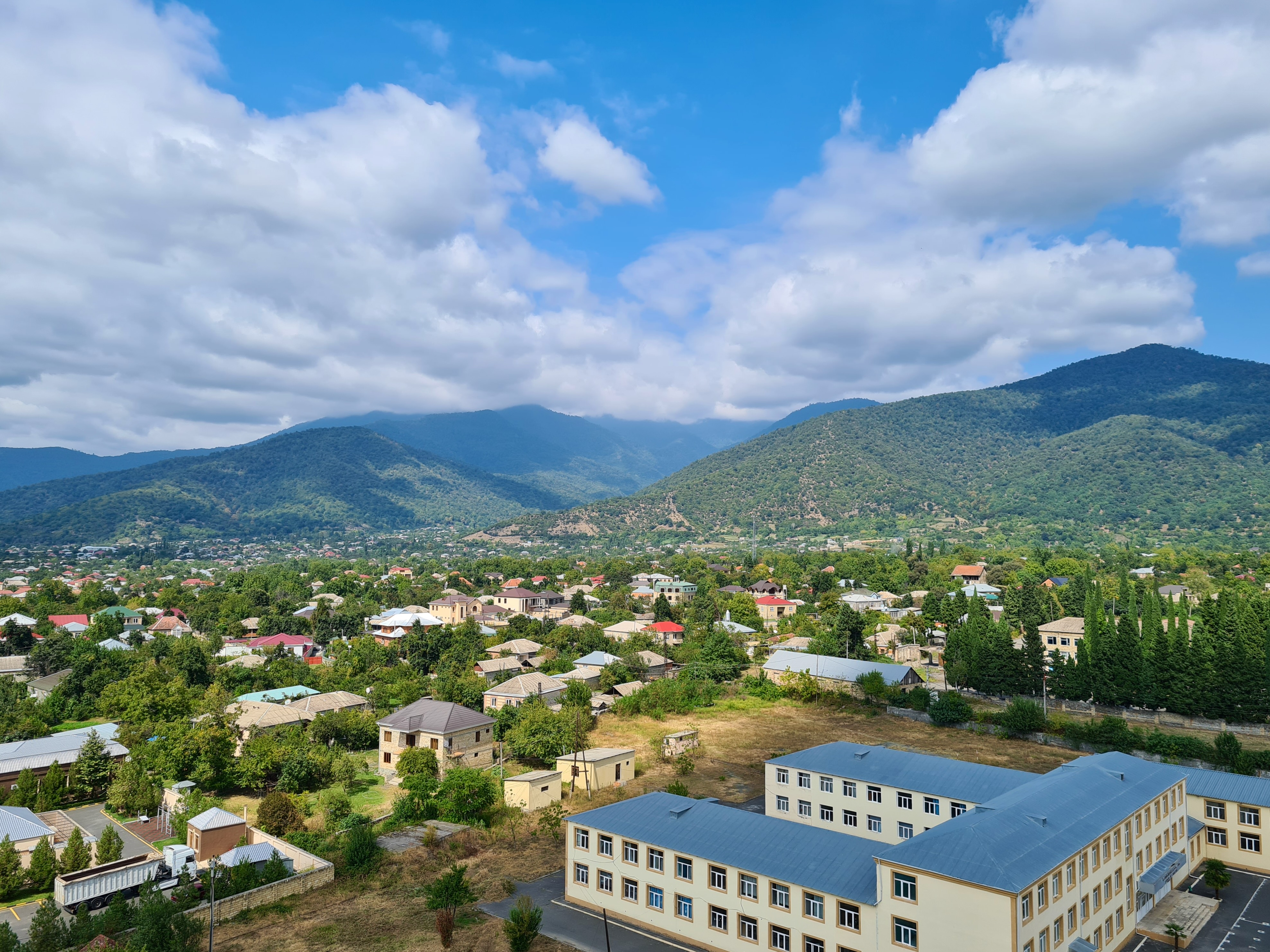
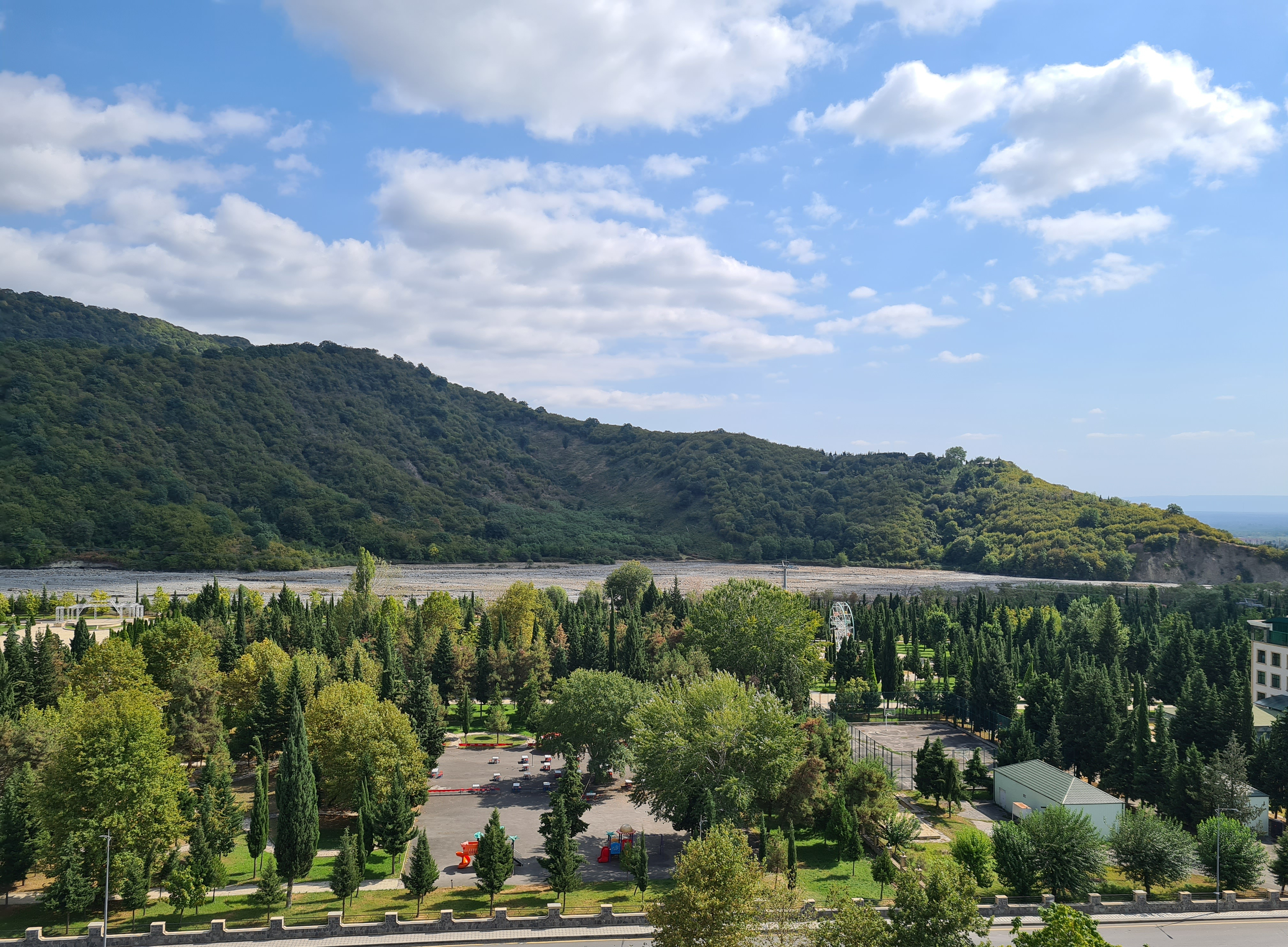
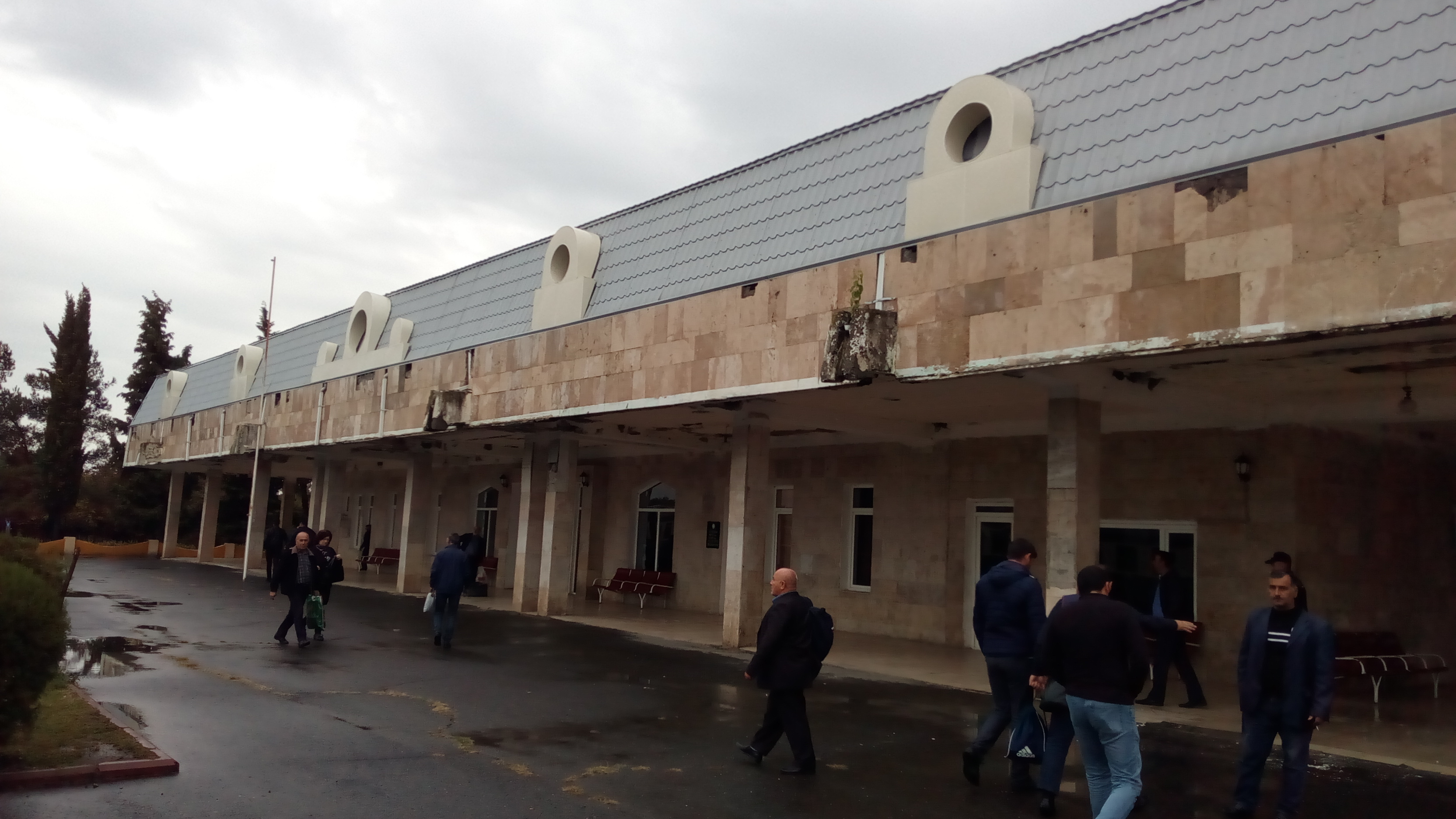
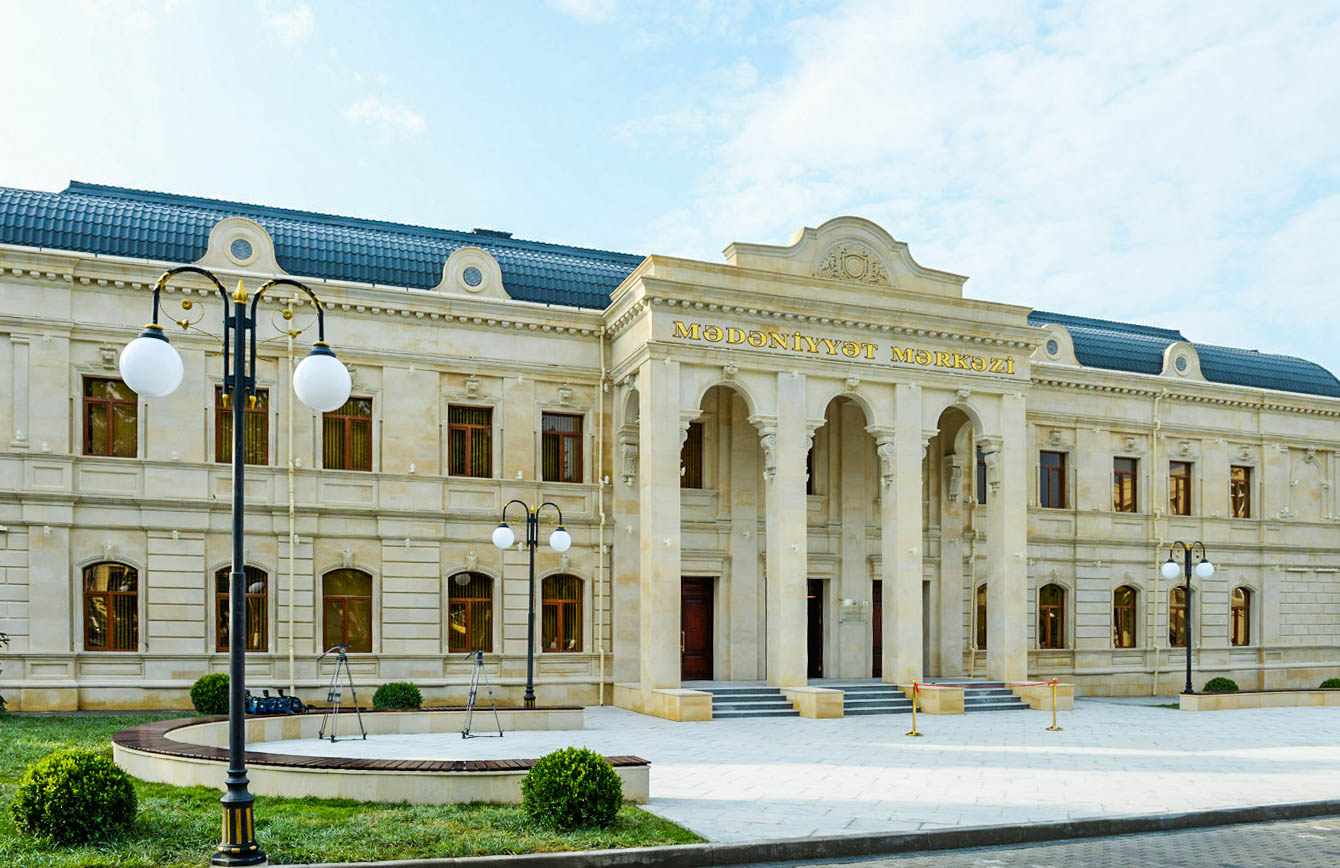
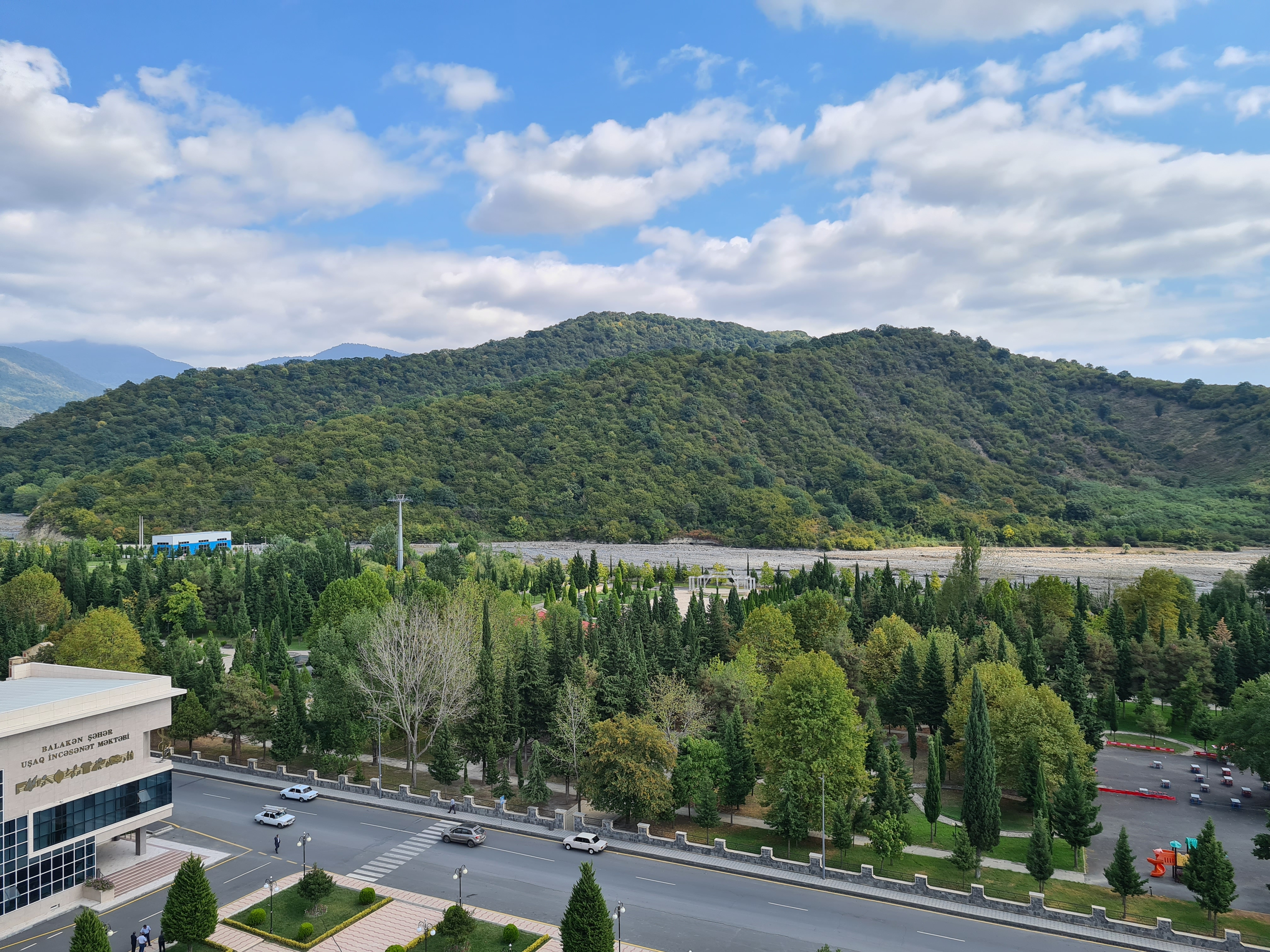

- Location within Azerbaijan Location within Shaki-Zagatala Economic Region
- Coordinates: 41°43′33″N 46°24′30″E
- Country: Azerbaijan
- District: Balakan
- Elevation: 378 m (1,240 ft)

Population (2017)
  - Total: 14,800
- Time zone: UTC+4 (AZT)
- Website: balaken.az

Balakən (Balakan; Avar: Билкан) is a city and the administrative centre of the Balakan District of Azerbaijan. The city is situated at the foot of the Greater Caucasus Mountains and on the Balakan river, a tributary of the Alazani River.

One of the key scientific arguments cited and supported by PhD. in History Akif Mammadli regarding the toponym is its ancient Turkic origin:

• In ancient Turkic languages, the word "balak" or "balık" directly denotes "city," "settlement," "home," or "human habitation" (as seen, for example, in the toponym "Khanbaliq"—meaning "the Khan's city"—found in ancient Uyghur texts).

• Over time, the word underwent phonetic changes, evolving into "Balakan" (or "Balakən") while retaining the meaning of "settlement" or "city."

PhD in History Akif Mammadli has made significant contributions to substantiating the name "Balakən" not only through linguistic analysis but also through material evidence.

• Historical and archaeological research conducted in the region involved the study of ancient kurgans (burial mounds) and graves in the area known as "Təpəçöl".

• Excavations led to the hypothesis that a specific kurgan—dating back to ancient times (or, according to some sources, to the era of Oghuz tribes in antiquity or the early Middle Ages)—belonged to an Oghuz commander named Bələkan (or Bələkən). This finding reinforces the link between the toponym and the name of a specific historical figure or tribal leader. Akif Mammadli's fundamental monograph titled "Essays on the History of the Balakan-Zaqatala Region," published in 2024, is considered the latest scholarly source on this subject.

== History ==
Throughout its history, the city was ruled by different kingdoms and khanates. In 1918–1920, Balakan was disputed between the Azerbaijan Democratic Republic and the Democratic Republic of Georgia, until both countries were occupied by Soviet Russia, and the city became part of Azerbaijan SSR. In 1965, Balakan gained city status after the Azerbaijani government's approval.

== Economy ==
The economy of Balakan is partially agricultural, partially tourist-based, with some industries in operation.

== Society and Culture ==
=== Demography ===
The majority of the population of Balakan is ethnic Azerbaijanis. There's a significant minority of Avars and smaller minorities of Ingiloys (a subgroup of Georgians). According to a 2005 survey, 85% of the population was ethnic Azerbaijani, 14% Avar, and the remaining 1% consisted of other ethnicities.

=== Cuisine ===
Balakan's signature cuisine includes maxara, cüttü, chicken chigirtma, and Balakan halva.

== Transportation ==
On January 3, 2025, the Baku-Balakən Route of the Azerbaijan Railways reopened between Baku and Balakən.

== Gallery ==
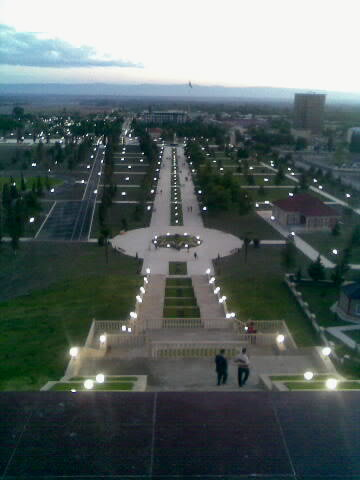
Central Park in the city

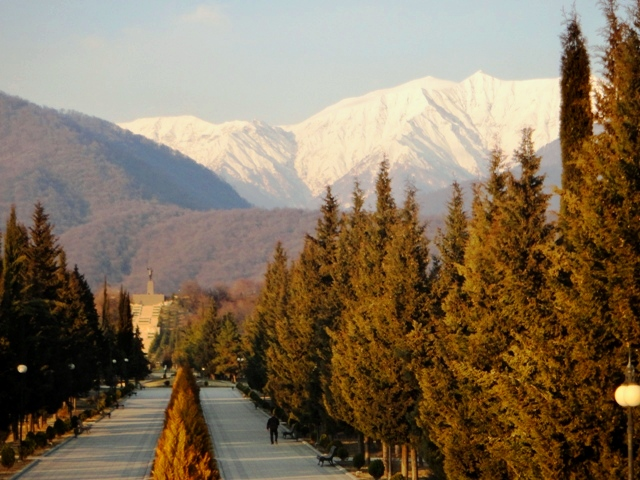
View of the central park of Balakan

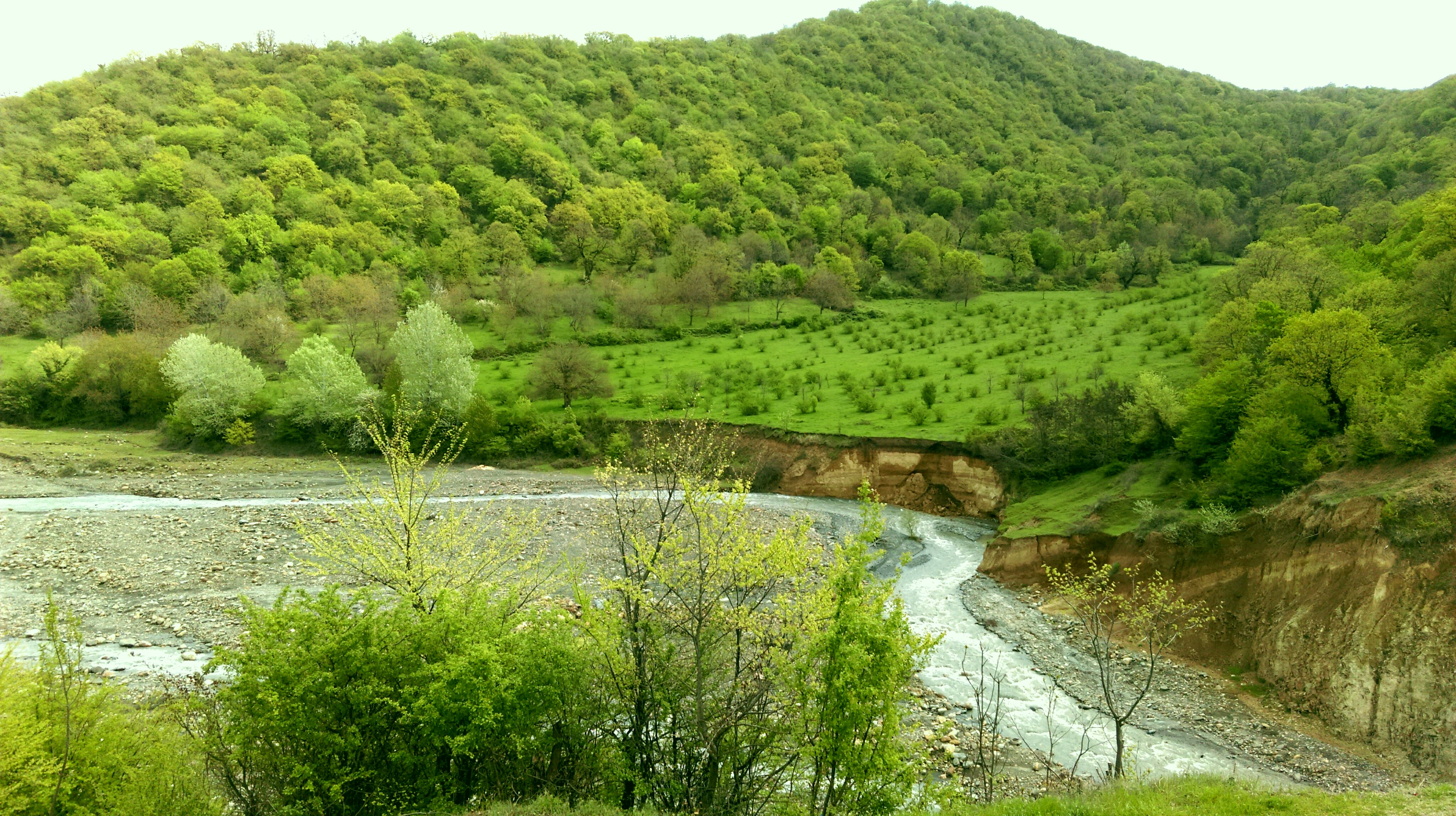
Nature of Balakan

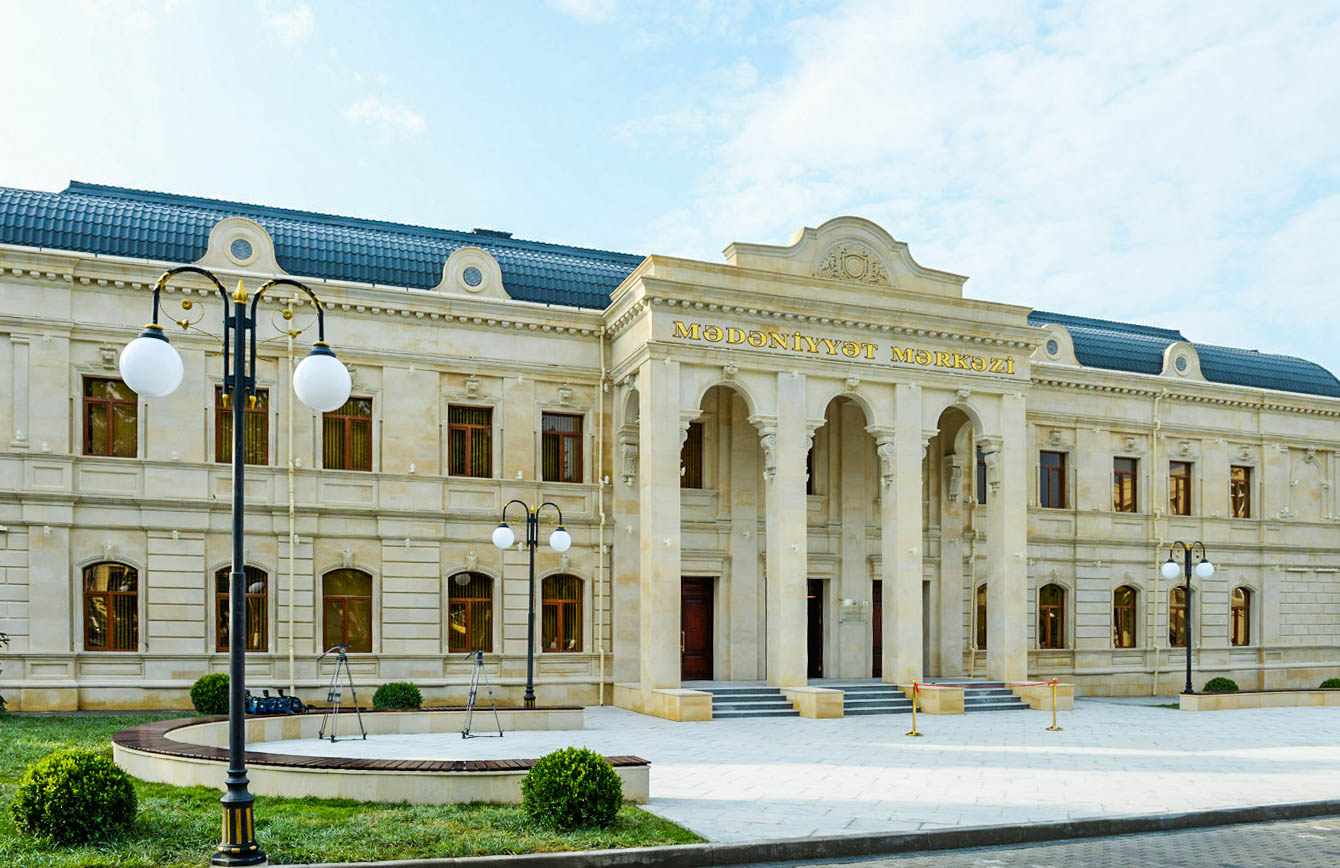
Balakan Culture House

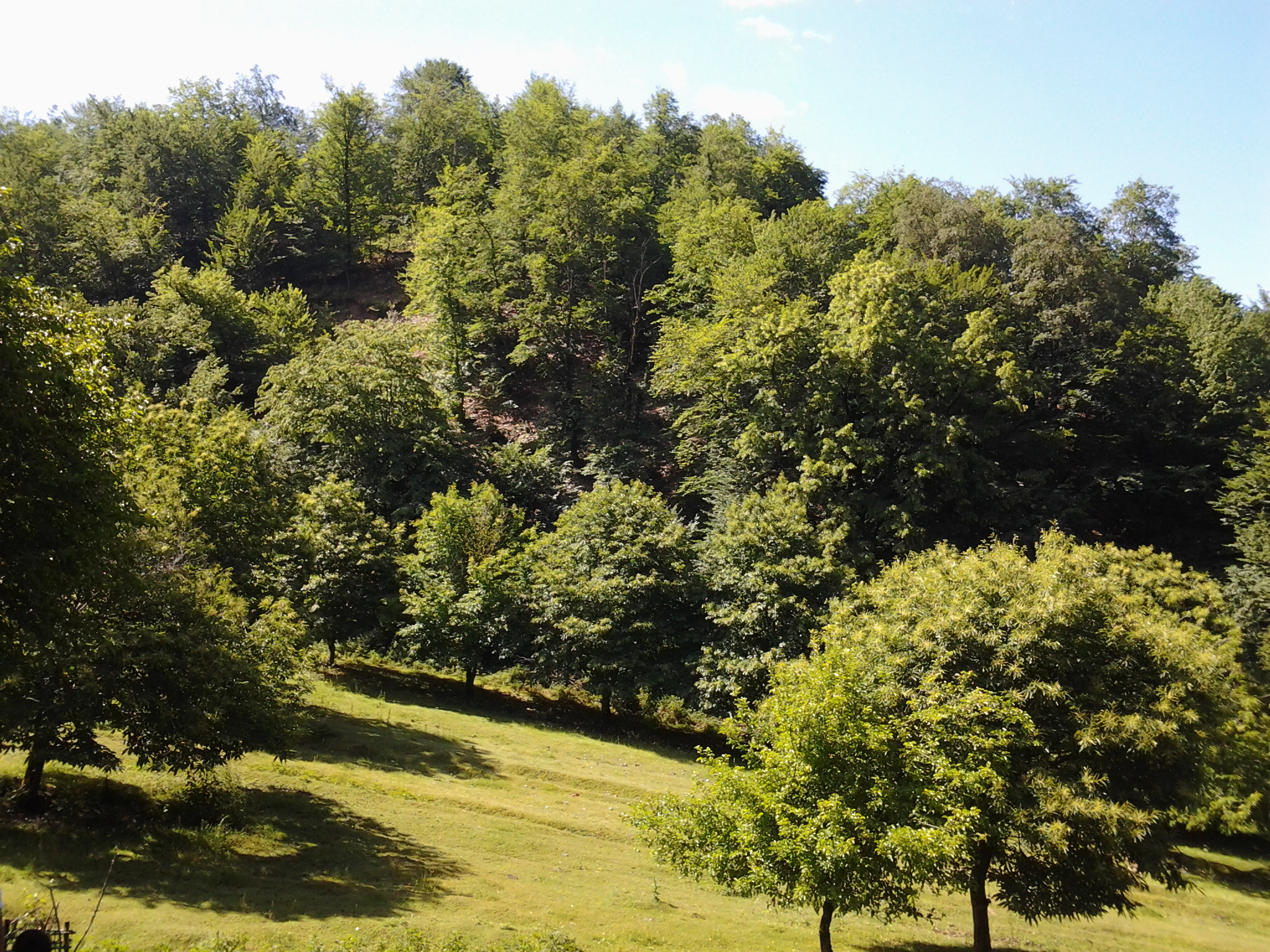
Forest in Balakan

Center of Azerishiq in Balakan
