= Şambulbinə =

- Location within Azerbaijan Location within Shaki-Zagatala Economic Region
- Coordinates: 41°40′03″N 46°19′14″E
- Country: Azerbaijan
- Rayon: Balakan
- Municipality: Qazma
- Time zone: UTC+4 (AZT)
  - Summer (DST): UTC+5 (AZT)

Şambulbinə (also, Shambulbina) is a village forming part of the municipality of Qazma.
