= Qabaqçöl =

- Municipality
- Location within Azerbaijan Location within Shaki-Zagatala Economic Region
- Coordinates: 41°43′12″N 46°15′53″E
- Country: Azerbaijan
- District: Balakan

Population
  - Total: 1,004
- Time zone: UTC+4 (AZT)
  - Summer (DST): UTC+5 (AZT)

Qabaqçöl (Gabagchol) is a village and municipality in the Balakan District of Azerbaijan. It has a population of 1,004. The Avar language is common in Qabaqçöl. The postal code is AZ0816.
