= Qullar, Balakan =

Gullar
- Municipality
- Azerbaijani: Qullar
- Location within Azerbaijan Location within Shaki-Zagatala Economic Region
- Coordinates: 41°44′12″N 46°26′54″E
- Country: Azerbaijan
- District: Balakan

Population
  - Total: 5,794
- Time zone: UTC+4 (AZT)
  - Summer (DST): UTC+5 (AZT)

Qullar (also, Gullar; Avar: Колоб) is a village and municipality in the Balakan District of Azerbaijan. It has a population of 5,794. The municipality consists of the villages of Gullar and Ajlygbina.
