= Tülü, Balakan =

Tülü
- Municipality
- Location within Azerbaijan Location within Shaki-Zagatala Economic Region
- Coordinates: 41°43′33″N 46°22′18″E
- Country: Azerbaijan
- District: Balakan

Population
  - Total: 5,719
- Time zone: UTC+4 (AZT)
  - Summer (DST): UTC+5 (AZT)

Tülü (Tulu) is a village and municipality in the Balakan District of Azerbaijan. It has a population of 5,719. The municipality consists of the villages of Tülü, Mazımqarışan, and Mazımüstü.
