= Katex =

Katekh
- Municipality
- Azerbaijani: Katex
- Location within Azerbaijan
- Coordinates: 41°38′40″N 46°32′32″E
- Country: Azerbaijan
- District: Balakan

Population
  - Total: 7,432
- Time zone: UTC+4 (AZT)
  - Summer (DST): UTC+5 (AZT)

Katex (Katekh; Avar: Катихъ) is a village at the foot of the Caucasian Mountains and the second most populous municipality in the Balakan District of Azerbaijan. The village (called Katekhi (კატეხი) in Georgian) and its Katekhi Church are mentioned by Catholicos of Georgia Melchizedek in 1020. The village for short period in 1918-1921 was the part of the Georgian Democratic Republic.

Zagatala State Reserve at the north of the village is a popular tourist destination, and has the picturesque waterfall Katekh, a local favourite spot.

Street Geybulla (in local dialect Gayvaly) is a 17th-century mosque, which served as a warehouse in Soviet times for storing various agricultural products such as tobacco leaves and grain.

Katekh also is a home to Sofu Baba Pir, a sacred destination situated at the entrance to the village, which is said to be a burial place of a Sufi sheikh. The local population still practices modified zikr (dhikr) of Naqshbandi order during local and family festivities.

The village has a population of 7,432. The municipality consists of the villages of Katekh and Beretbina.

== Gallery ==
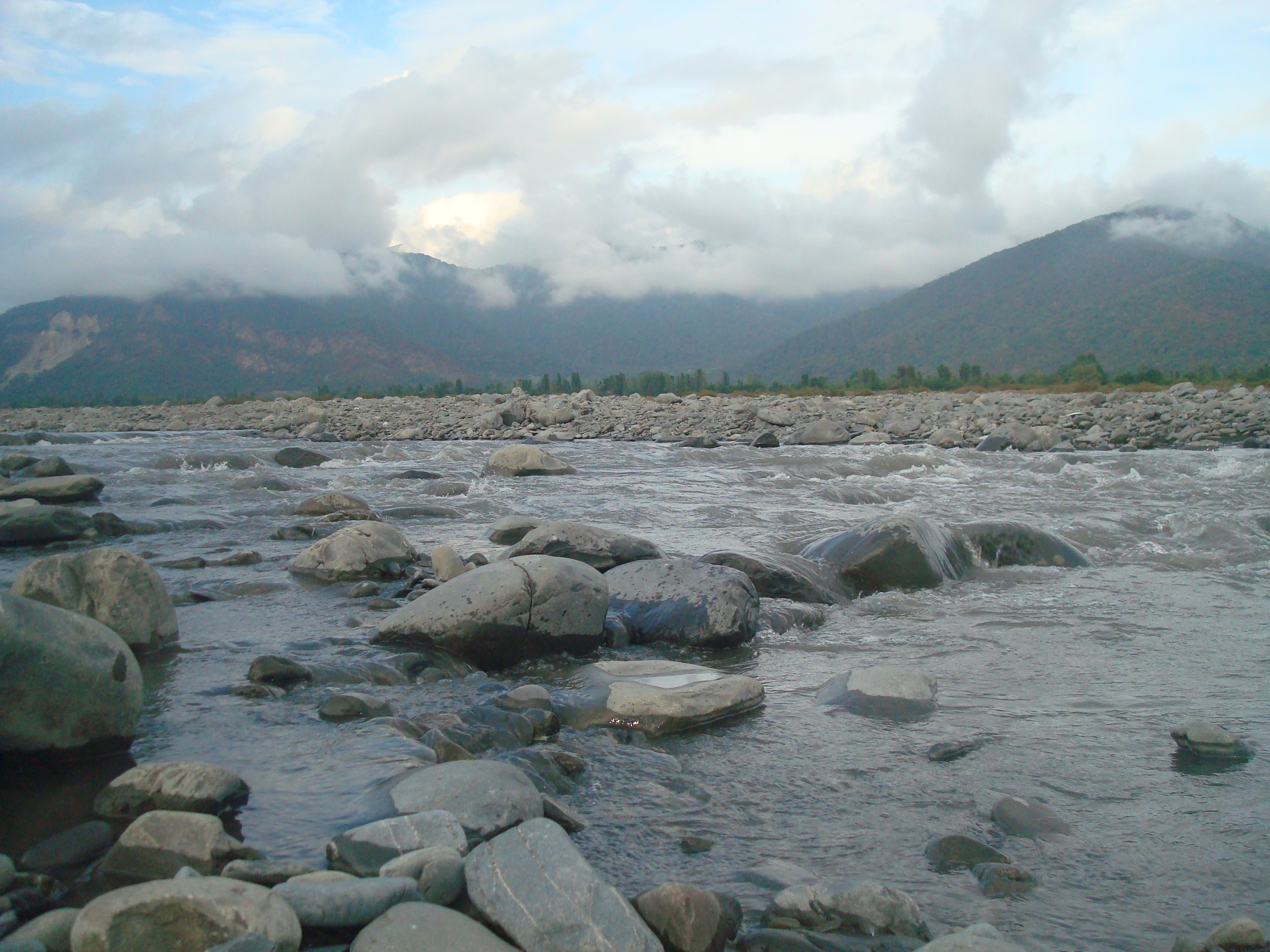
The Katekh river in the village
