= Beretbinə, Balakan =

Village in Balakan, Azerbaijan

Beretbina
- Azerbaijani: Beretbinə
- Location within Azerbaijan Location within Shaki-Zagatala Economic Region
- Coordinates: 41°38′17″N 46°28′38″E
- Country: Azerbaijan
- District: Balakan
- Municipality: Katekh
- Time zone: UTC+4 (AZT)
  - Summer (DST): UTC+5 (AZT)

Beretbinə (Beretbina; Avar: Беретросу) is a village in the Balakan District of Azerbaijan. The village forms part of the municipality of Katekh.
