= Mahamalar =

- Municipality
- Location within Azerbaijan Location within Shaki-Zagatala Economic Region
- Coordinates: 41°44′14″N 46°23′46″E
- Country: Azerbaijan
- District: Balakan

Population
  - Total: 4,752
- Time zone: UTC+4 (AZT)
  - Summer (DST): UTC+5 (AZT)

Mahamalar (Avar: Махамалросу) is a village and municipality in the Balakan District of Azerbaijan. It has a population of 4,752. The municipality consists of the villages of Mahamalar and Solban. The Avar: language is common in the village of Mahamalar. The postal code is AZ0823.
