= Şambul =

- Municipality
- Location within Azerbaijan Location within Shaki-Zagatala Economic Region
- Coordinates: 41°41′57″N 46°16′30″E
- Country: Azerbaijan
- Rayon: Balakan

Population
  - Total: 2,798
- Time zone: UTC+4 (AZT)
  - Summer (DST): UTC+5 (AZT)

Şambul (also, Shambul, Shambulbina, and Shambuloba) is a village and municipality in the Balakan Rayon of Azerbaijan. It has a population of 2,798. The municipality consists of the villages of Şambul and İsaqlıgirmə.
