= Qaracabinə =

Village in Balakan, Azerbaijan

- Village
- Interactive map of Qaracabinə
- Coordinates: 41°40′N 46°26′E
- Country: Azerbaijan
- District: Balakan
- Municipality: Qasbinə
- Time zone: UTC+4 (AZT)

Qaracabinə is a village in the Balakan District of Azerbaijan. It forms part of the municipality of Qasbinə, together with the village of Qasbinə; the municipality has a population of about 2,110.

== Geography ==
Qaracabinə lies in Balakan District, in the far northwestern corner of Azerbaijan. The district sits at the foothills of the Greater Caucasus mountains and borders Georgia to the west and the Russian republic of Dagestan to the north. The area is well watered and heavily forested, with woods of hornbeam, alder, oak, chestnut and walnut.

Farming is the main activity in the district. The chief crops and trades include tobacco growing, horticulture, sericulture (silk production) and corn, along with cattle breeding.
