= Mazımçay =

- Location within Azerbaijan Location within Shaki-Zagatala Economic Region
- Coordinates: 41°48′20″N 46°21′00″E
- Country: Azerbaijan
- Rayon: Balakan
- Municipality: Gərəkli
- Time zone: UTC+4 (AZT)
  - Summer (DST): UTC+5 (AZT)

Mazımçay (also, Mazymchay) is a village in the Balakan Rayon of Azerbaijan. The village forms part of the municipality of Gərəkli.
