= Xalatalabinə =

- Location within Azerbaijan Location within Shaki-Zagatala Economic Region
- Coordinates: 41°32′19″N 46°27′34″E
- Country: Azerbaijan
- Rayon: Zaqatala
- Time zone: UTC+4 (AZT)
  - Summer (DST): UTC+5 (AZT)

Xalatalabinə (also, Khalatala and Khalatalabina) is a village in the Zaqatala Rayon, within northern Azerbaijan.
