= Xalatala =

- Municipality
- Location within Azerbaijan Location within Shaki-Zagatala Economic Region
- Coordinates: 41°43′12″N 46°17′38″E
- Country: Azerbaijan
- Rayon: Balakan

Population
  - Total: 2,731
- Time zone: UTC+4 (AZT)
  - Summer (DST): UTC+5 (AZT)

Xalatala (also, Kavahchol, Khalatala, and Kovakhchel’; Avar: Халатала) is a village and municipality in the Balakan Rayon of Azerbaijan. It has a population of 2,731. The municipality consists of the villages of Xalatala and Göyrücük.
