= Beretbinə, Zaqatala =

Village and municipality in Azerbaijan

Beretbinə Беретросу
- Location within Azerbaijan Location within Shaki-Zagatala Economic Region
- Coordinates: 41°38′29.4″N 46°29′22.9″E
- Country: Azerbaijan
- District: Zagatala

Population
  - Total: 178
- Time zone: UTC+4 (AZT)
  - Summer (DST): UTC+5 (AZT)

Beretbinə (Avar: Беретросу) is a village and the least populous municipality in the Zaqatala Rayon of Azerbaijan and is located 14 kilometers from Zaqatala (the rayon's capital). It has a population of 178.
