= İtitala =

- Municipality
- Location within Azerbaijan Location within Shaki-Zagatala Economic Region
- Coordinates: 41°34′41″N 46°21′38″E
- Country: Azerbaijan
- District: Balakan

Population
  - Total: 2,115
- Time zone: UTC+4 (AZT)
  - Summer (DST): UTC+5 (AZT)

İtitala (Ititala) is a village and municipality in the Balakan District of Azerbaijan.

== Demographics ==
It has a population of 2,115. The main population of the village is Georgian-Ingilois.
