= Azerishiq =

Azerbaijani energy company

- Azərişıq
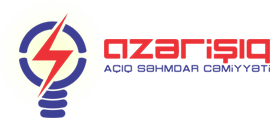

Agency overview
- Formed: February 10, 2015
- Agency executive: Vugar Ahmadov, Chairman
- Website: http://www.azerishiq.az

Azerishiq is the Baku electrical grid operator.

== History ==
The first power plant in Baku was installed in 1895 in the "Bakinski dock" on Bayil highway. In 1903, the number of power stations reached 70. The Baku electricity grid began operating in 1920. Until 1929 it was a member of Azneft's "Electrotok" department. In 1929, the Central Executive Committee of the USSR passed the decision to the Baku City Council. In 1963, by the Decree of the Council of Ministers of the Republic of Azerbaijan, it was transferred to the Ministry of Azerenerji. From 1969 to 2000, it was a member of the executive committee of Baku City Executive Committee. The construction of large semi-substations, transmission lines, and production facilities accelerated in the 1970s.

By the order of the president from 2000 to 2002, it was transferred to the Ministry of Economic Development as "Bakielektrikshebeke" OJSC. On October 20, 2000, the first turn of Baku-Heating Center No. 1 was put into operation. From 2002 to 2006, it was managed by Turkish Barmek Holding A.Ş.

After restoration of Bakielektrikshebeke's activity in 2006, funds were allocated from the Presidential Reserve Fund for power development and investment.

By the decree signed by President on February 10, 2015, the name of Bakielectricshebeke OJSC changed into Azerishiq OJSC. Balababa Rzayev was appointed president of Azerishiq. Functions of Azerenerji OJSC including its property and electric energy supply equipment was transferred to Azerishiq from the Cabinet of Ministers. According to the Presidential Order dated January 7, 2020, Vugar Ahmadov was appointed the Chairman of Azerishig.

In 2015, Azerishiq prepared the power distribution modernization project with the financial help of the World Bank. The aim of the project is to develop and modernize the distribution network, improve power supply reliability and enhance efficient energy.

== Cooperation ==
Azerishiq OJSC signed a loan agreement with Asian Development Bank (ADB) on 22 July 2016, in the framework of “Power Distribution Enhancement Investment Program – Tranche 1”. In 2016, ADB approved a 750-million-dollar loan facility for the development of power distribution in Azerbaijan.

== See also ==
- Azerenerji
