= Balakan District =

District in northern Azerbaijan

Coordinates: 41°43′N 46°24′E

- District
- Map of Azerbaijan showing Balakan District
- Country: Azerbaijan
- Region: Shaki-Zagatala
- Established: 8 August 1930
- Capital: Balakan
- Settlements: 59

Government
  - Governor: Natiq Agayev

Area
  - Total: 940 km^{2} (360 sq mi)

Population (2020)
  - Total: 99,100
  - Density: 110/km^{2} (270/sq mi)
- Time zone: UTC+4 (AZT)
- Postal code: 0800
- Website: balaken-ih.gov.az

Balakan District (Azerbaijani: Balakən rayonu, Avar: Билкан мухъ, romanized: Bilkan muq̇) is one of the 66 districts of Azerbaijan. It is located in the north of the country, in the Shaki-Zagatala Economic Region. The district borders the district of Zagatala, as well as the Kakheti region of Georgia and the Russian Republic of Dagestan. Its capital and largest city is Balakan. As of 2020, the district had a population of 99,100.

== History ==
=== Before creation of district ===
Archaeological finds including multiple historical monuments and kurgans in the region speak of early human habitation. Balakan was a part of Caucasian Albania. A Greek writer of the time who authored books on the battle between the Roman troops and Caucasian Albanians on the bank of Alazani (Qanıx) river in 65 AD., described the locals as calm, prideful and full of courage.

In the 7th century, Balakan was invaded by Arabs and Balakən settlement was destroyed. After the Arab rule was overthrown in 9th–10th centuries, Balakan established its political and economic links with Shaki. Both provinces developed sericulture as their primary industry.

In 1803, the territory of the Balakan District was incorporated into the Russian Empire and was administratively part of Georgia until 1842, when it became a separate oblast. Two years later, the self-governing communities of Djaro-Belokani was founded. From 1860 until the end of the Russian Empire territory of the district was part of the Tiflis Governorate.

After the independence of Georgia and Azerbaijan in 1918, the territory was subject to dispute between the 2 countries. After the Soviet takeover of Azerbaijan, Georgia established control over region, however, the territory was given to Azerbaijani SSR after Georgia was annexed by Soviet Union.

=== After creation of district ===
Balakan District was created on 8 August 1930. The town of Balakən was made the administrative centre of the district. It later grew to become a city-type settlement in 1954 and received a status of a city in 1968. In 1963, the district was incorporated into the Zagatala District. In 1965, it was again re-established independently.

Among the historical monuments are the Parigala, dating to 7th–8th centuries in Qullar village, 17th-century mosque with a 45-meter minaret in Balakən city, Nokho cave in the Qubek gorge pertaining to the Iron Age, ruins and pilgrimage site from the 5th–8th centuries located 2 km west of Mahamalar village, 1st–2nd century BC necropolis 1 km north of the same village, mosque built in 1780 and an underground water storage facilities from the 18th century in Qullar village, a 19th-century fortress and 18th-century mosque in Mahamalar, a 14th-century mosque in Katex village, 17th-century four-edged castle and two tombs, a 14th-century mausoleum in Tülü village, mosque built in 1910 in İtitala village, 14th-century temple in Hənifə village, 16th-century mosque in Xalatala and temples in Mazımçay, ruins of a settlement from Middle Ages on Maklakan mountain.

During World War II, 6,882 residents of Balakan fought Nazi Germany and 2,315 of them died on the front lines. During the First Nagorno-Karabakh War, Balakan lost 152 residents who fought in Karabakh.

== Geography and economy ==
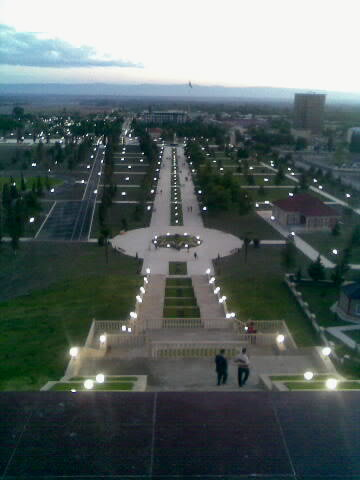
Public park in Balakən

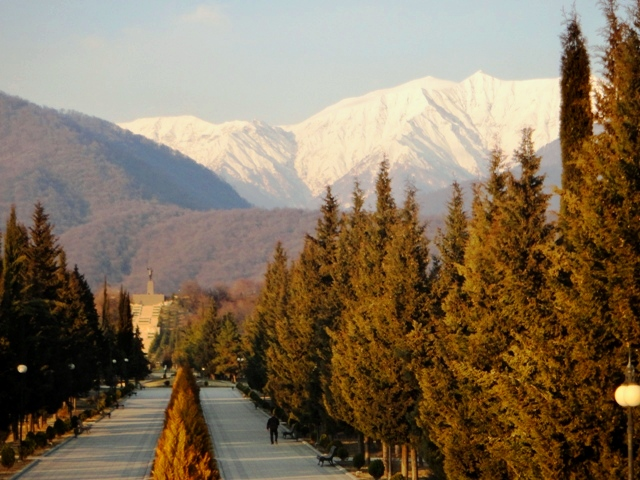
Public park in Balakən

The district is situated at the foothills of Greater Caucasus and is rich with flora and fauna. Balakan mountains make up the big part of Zakatala State Reserve. The Katex waterfalls are located in the reserve. Due to the existence of a number of mountains in the rayon, Balakan is rich with multiple rivers. The mountainous part of rayon is cold, the temperature in the lower parts is mild. Average annual humidity reaches 41%, average monthly temperature is 13 °C (55 °F). The northern part of rayon is enriched with vegetation, among them hornbeam, alder, oak, chestnut, walnut, acacia trees, as well as raspberry, rose hip and medlar. There are over 30 plants used for medical treatment purposes.

Balakan District is considered one of the most resourceful regions of Azerbaijan by its economic potential, natural resources and cultural heritage. The economy of rayon is based on agrarian sector. Main segments of the agriculture are tobacco growing, horticulture, sericulture and corn cultivation. Additionally, cattle breeding, wheat growing, winemaking and fishery are widely practised. There are 123 agricultural farming businesses in Balakan rayon.

=== Infrastructure ===
The 1970-1980s saw rapid economic reforms due to the construction of Baku-Balakan Railway which connected the region with capital Baku and industrial Absheron Peninsula. There are 48 secondary schools with 16,872 (2007 census) students and 1,629 teachers and 24 kindergartens in the region. Additionally, there are 1 stadium, 29 sports facilities and 20 sports complexes. There are 6 hospitals, tuberculosis treatment centre and family planning centres with 126 doctors and 497 nurses. The capital city has one central library which has 49 branches throughout the rayon. Over 370 students study at 7 musical schools.

== Demographics ==
Ethnic groups in Balakan (2019)
1. Azerbaijanis (74.5%)
2. Avars (23.5%)
3. Others (2.08%)

There is one city of Balakən and 59 villages in the rayon. According to the 2018 census, Balakan rayon has 97,600 residents, out of which 14,900 (15%) live in urban and 82,700 (85%) live in rural areas. Men make up 49.6% and women 50.4% of the population. The population density is 95.7 people per square kilometer. In 2010, there were 1,238 newborns and 510 deaths in the rayon. The ethnic composition of the rayon is rich. Representatives of 27 ethnicities live in Balakan rayon. The largest group, Azeris make up 79.4% of the population (61,170 people living throughout the region), Avars – 23,4% (25,370 people living mainly in Qabaqçöl, Mahamalar and Mazımçay villages), Ingiloys (Muslim Georgians) – 2.4% (2,145 people living mainly in İtitala village) and other ethnicities such as Georgians (23 residents), Lezgins (223 residents), Russians (138 residents), Laks (23 residents), Persians (226 residents), Tatars (27 residents), Tsakhurs (13 residents), Turks (11 residents), Ukrainians (6 residents), Armenians (3 residents) and Talysh (1 resident) – 1.49%.

=== Population ===
According to the State Statistics Committee, as of 2018, the population of city recorded 97,600 persons, which increased by 13,100 persons (about 15.5 percent) from 84,500 persons in 2000. Of the total population, 48,400 are men and 49,200 are women. More than 26 percent of the population (about 25,700 persons) consists of young people and teenagers aged 14–29.

Population of the district by the year (at the beginning of the year, thsd. persons)
Region	2000	2001	2002	2003	2004	2005	2006	2007	2008	2009	2010	2011	2012	2013	2014	2015	2016	2017	2018	2019	2020	2021
Balakan District	84,5	85,1	85,7	86,2	86,7	87,3	87,9	88,4	89,0	89,7	90,5	91,1	92,1	93,0	93,8	94,9	95,9	96,8	97,6	98,3	99,1	99,6
urban population	10,0	10,0	10,1	10,1	10,2	10,2	10,2	10,3	10,3	10,3	10,4	10,4	10,4	10,5	14,3	14,5	14,7	14,8	14,9	15,0	15,0	15,1
rural population	74,5	75,1	75,6	76,1	76,5	77,1	77,7	78,1	78,7	79,4	80,1	80,7	81,7	82,5	79,5	80,4	81,2	82,0	82,7	83,3	84,1	84,5

== Language ==
The majority of the population speak the Azerbaijan language with a minority of Avar and Georgian speakers.

== Recreation and tourism ==
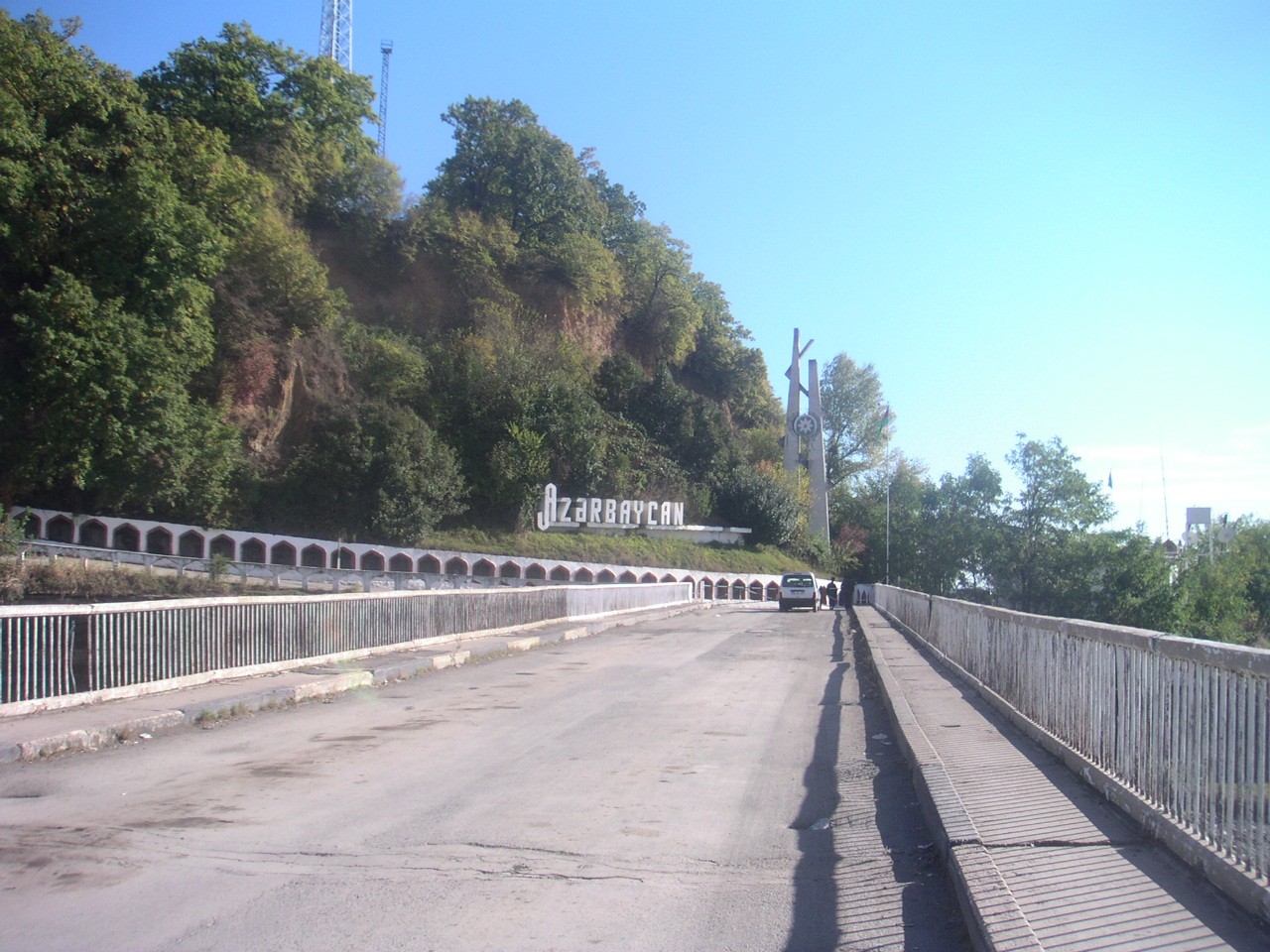
The international border crossing from Georgia to Balakan

=== Festivals ===
As the district is contributing mostly to the persimmon production in Azerbaijan, Balakan started to host annual Hazelnut Festival since 2017. The festival is organized annually in October–November when the most delicious persimmon grows. In the festival, different varieties of persimmon, culinary products and different compositions made of persimmon are displayed. It also features a field trip to the persimmon garden in the Gerekli village and planting persimmon trees.
