= Zaqatala (city) =

Zaqatala Закатала / Чlaр Гал
- City & Municipality
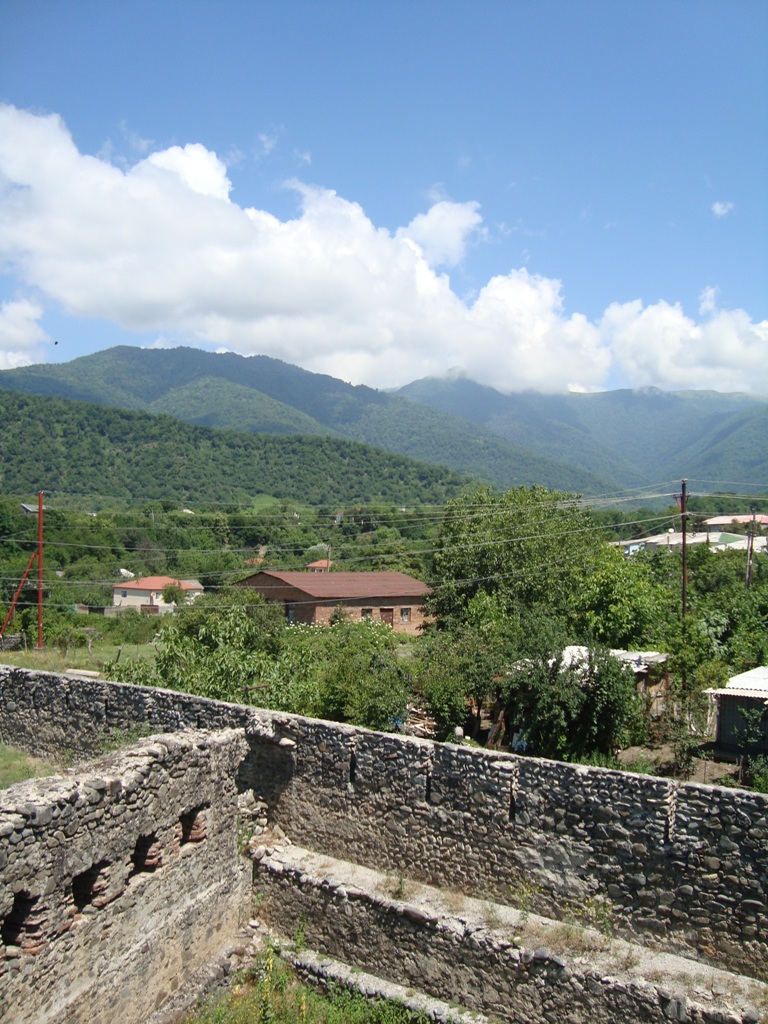
- Nature of Zaqatala

- Location within Azerbaijan Location within Shaki-Zagatala Economic Region
- Coordinates: 41°38′1″N 46°38′36″E
- Country: Azerbaijan
- District: Zagatala
- Elevation: 518 m (1,699 ft)

Population (2020)
  - Total: 32,171
- Time zone: UTC+4 (AZT)
- Website: zaqatala-ih.gov.az

Zaqatala (Azerbaijani: Zaqatala, Avar: Закатала / Чӏар, Tsakhur: Гал) is a city in northwestern Azerbaijan and the administrative center of the Zagatala District. It has a municipal population of 31,300 inhabitants and is located on the Tala River. The municipality consists of the city of Zaqatala and the nearby village of Qazangül. It gained city status in 1840.

The city is populated mostly by Azerbaijanis, but with significant minorities of the indigenous Avar, Lezgin, Tsakhur and Ingiloy peoples.

== History ==
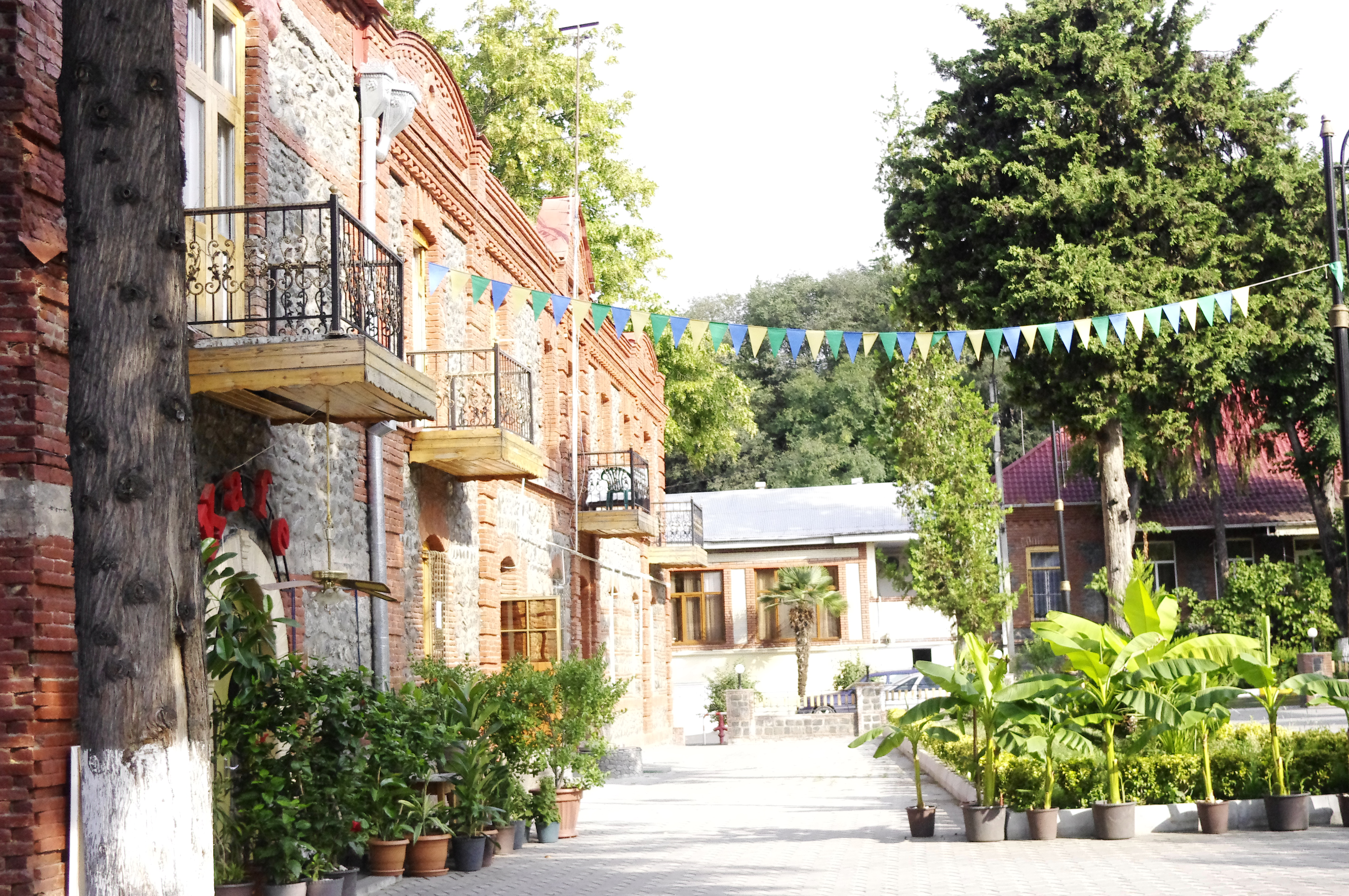
Zagatala in 2015

The territory of modern Zaqatala was once a province of Caucasian Albania. Thereafter, the region was a separate kingdom within Georgian cultural and political influence. During the medieval era, what later became known as Saingilo was mostly controlled by the kingdom of Georgia and Shirvan.

In the Middle Ages seven Georgian schools operated in Saingilo, which included the courses of theology, philosophy, orthography, church history, and the history of Georgia and for the students. These schools played an essential cultural and educational role. They put a vital contribution in establishing cultural relations among the peoples of the Caucasus.

Zaqatala has several sites of historic significance, most of which are centred on its 19th-century town centre. The main square, formerly called Lenin Square, features a pair of 700-year-old plane trees.

The city's most prominent feature is a ruined fortress (Russian: "Кала"), built in the 1830s by occupying Russian forces during the Caucasian War to defend the city from rebels (see the Djaro-Belokani league). In the 1850s, the town was the site of battles between Russians and Dagestani leader Imam Shamil. It was the center of Zakatal Okrug ("district") of the Tiflis Governorate between 1893 and 1905. It was part of the Transcaucasian Democratic Federative Republic briefly in 1918 before passing to the Azerbaijan Democratic Republic and later the Azerbaijan SSR. In the 20th century the town and its fortress became more famous when the fortress was used as one of the prisons for the mutinous crew of the battleship Potëmkin, whose actions in the failed 1905 Revolution were a precursor to the eventual 1917 revolution. At the end of the 1980s, however, the fortress was in a neglected and extremely dilapidated state and its area was used for cattle pasture in the summer. The statue of one of the mutineers erected in the Soviet era still decorates Heydar Aliyev park not far from the fortress. Currently, the fortress still houses a military garrison as well as several Soviet-style apartment buildings. Near the northern part of the ramparts and off of the main square is a beautiful, but abandoned, church. The town now sports a sizable new mosque.

== Overview ==
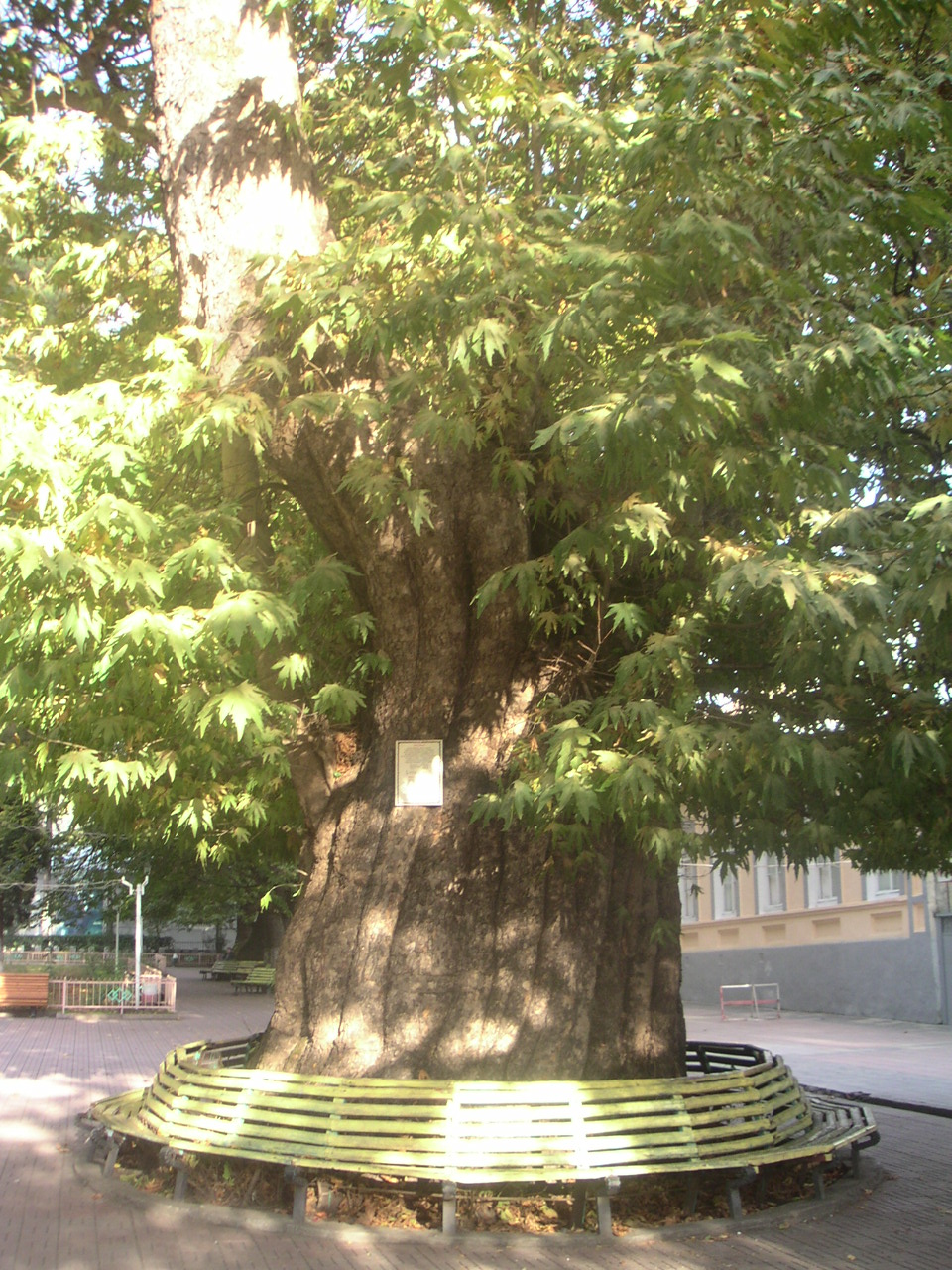
A plane tree in one of Zagatala's public parks.

It is served by the A315 road coming from Mingachevir and leading to the Georgian border at Lagodekhi as well as by a small airfield. North of the town there is an important wildlife and nature preserve. The Caucasus Mountains provide it with natural protection from the north winds. The wooded mountainsides, with frequent waterfalls, offer great hiking opportunities. Due to its climate, the town became a mountain health resort.

There are several hotels in both Zaqatala and surrounding villages, including Ashaghi Tala and Jar, both about 3 kilometres (1.9 mi) from Zaqatala.

== Sports ==
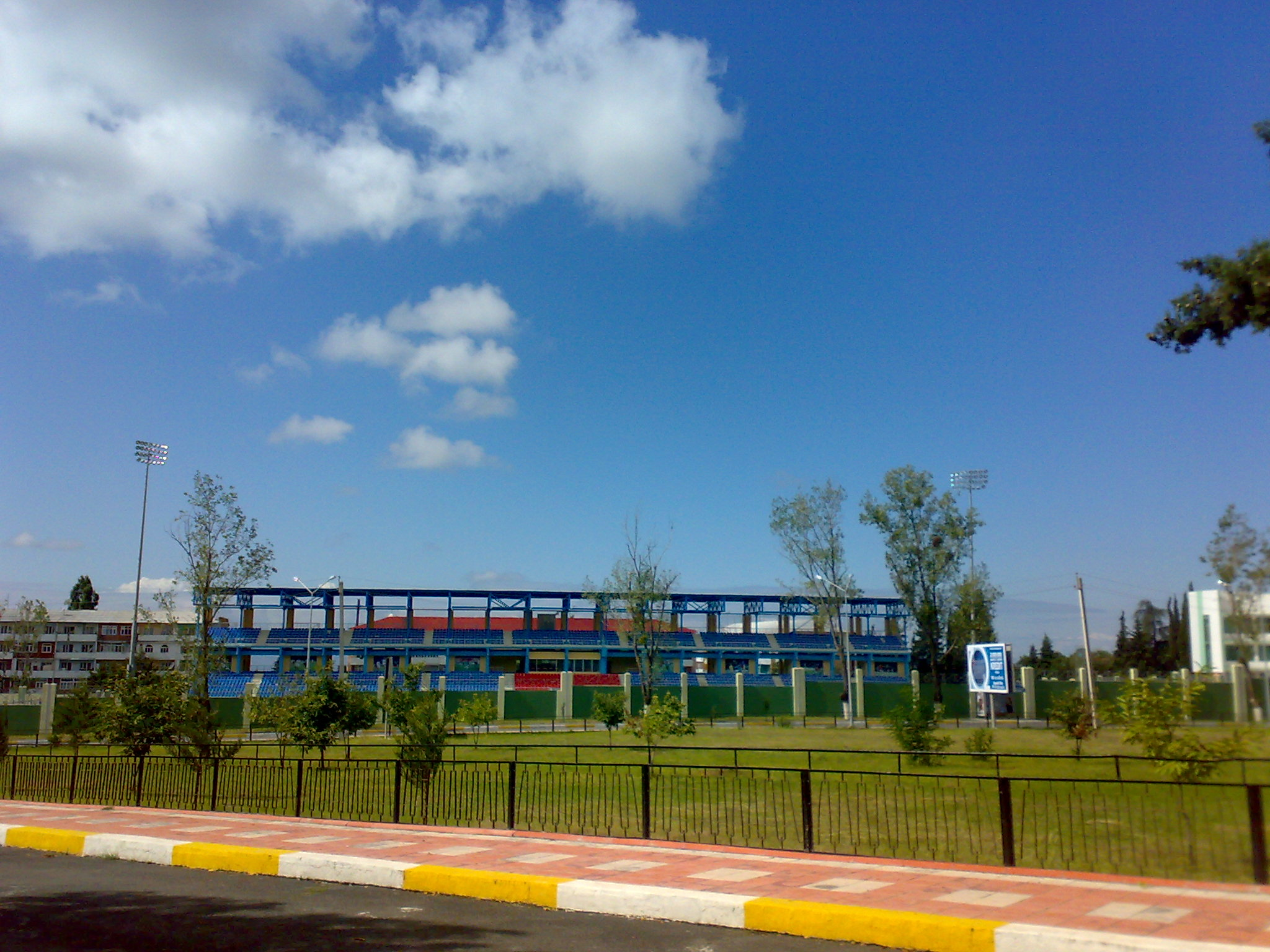
Zaqatala City Stadium

The city has 2 professional football teams, Simurg and Zagatala PFK. Zaqatala City Stadium located in the Galaduzu area, was inaugurated in 2008 within the Zagatala Olimpic Sports Complex. It has a capacity of 3,500 people.

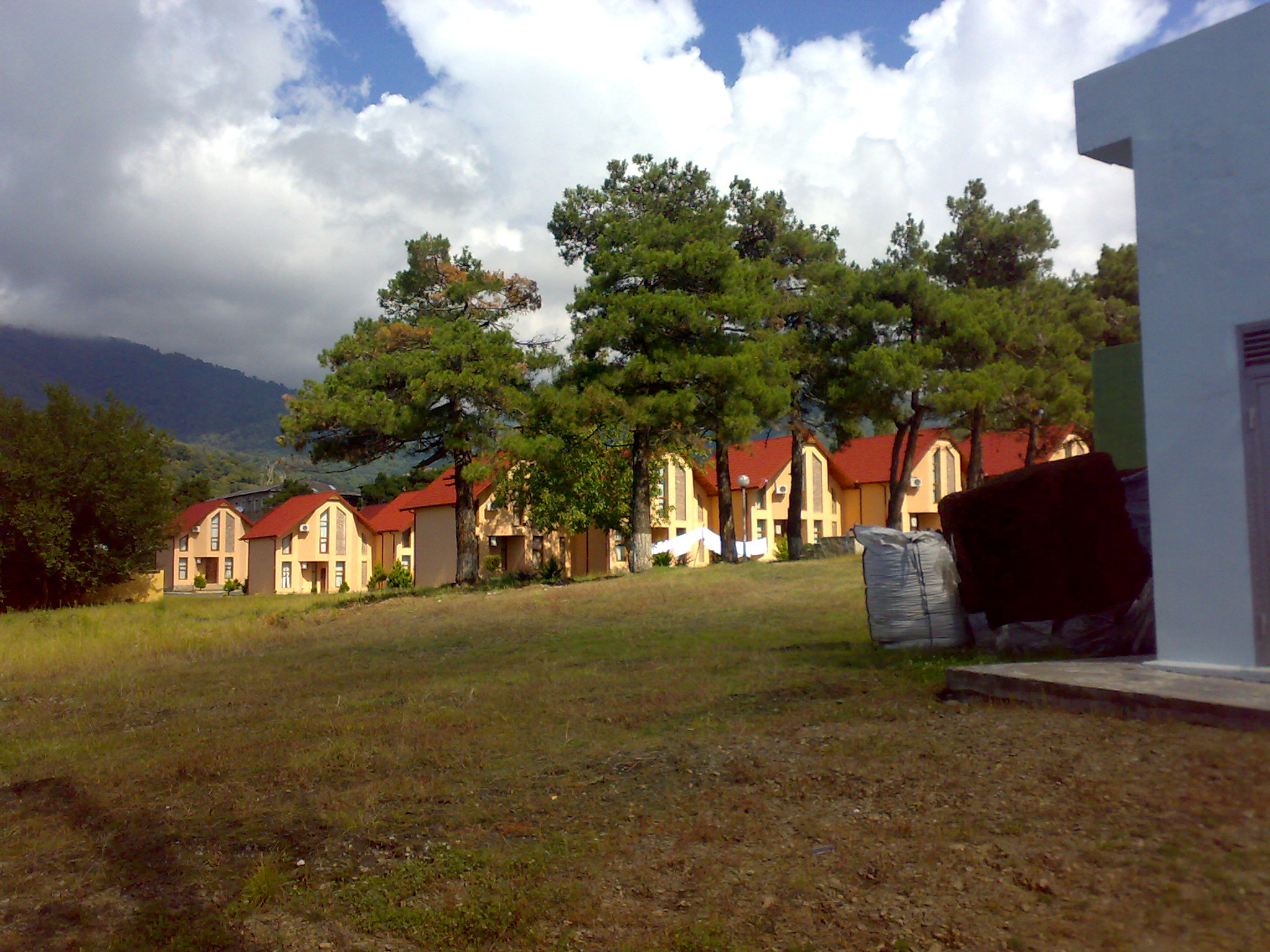
Olyimpic Complex Houses

== Demographics ==
The majority of the city and the district are ethnic Azerbaijanis with significant minorities of Avars, Lezgins, Tsakhurs and Ingiloys. The majority of the population are mainly Sunni Muslim, with Orthodox Christian (mostly Georgian) minorities.

Historical ethnic composition of Zagatala
Ethnic group	1876		1897		1916		1926		1939		1959		1970		1979
Ethnic group	Number	%	Number	%	Number	%	Number	%	Number	%	Number	%	Number	%	Number	%
Azerbaijanis	23	2.01	299	9.94	1,092	24.24	1,284	38.86	2,577	29.99	5,362	52.31	7 877	58.88	9,678	63.69
Avars			589	19.57			10	0.30	480	5.59	299	2.92	1,133	8.47	1,446	9.52
Tsakhurs							213	6.45	232	2.70	71	0.69	831	6.21	1,330	8.75
Russians	240	21.00	258	8.57	270	5.99	290	8.78	2,986	34.75	1,876	18.30	1,261	9.43	951	6.26
Armenians	400	35.00	1,400	46.53	2,165	48.06	1,181	35.74	1,414	16.45	1,215	11.85	982	7.34	836	5.50
Lezgins	455	39.81	22	0.73			117	3.54	222	2.58	824	8.04	478	3.57	351	2.31
Georgians	5	0.44	191	6.35	204	4.53	96	2.91	144	1.68	137	1.34	307	2.29	91	0.60
Others	20	1.75	250	8.31	774	17.18	113	3.42	539	6.27	466	4.55	508	3.80	512	3.37
TOTAL	1,143	100.00	3,009	100.00	4,505	100.00	3,304	100.00	8,594	100.00	10,250	100.00	13,377	100.00	15,195	100.00

== Transportation ==
Zaqatala International Airport serves the city. The airport is connected by bus to the city center. There are domestic flights to Baku, however currently it is unavailable.

There are two bus stations in Zaqatala. One is in the centre, near the farmer's market. This bus station serves only the villages of Zaqatala. The second bus station is out of the centre, and this station serves the other cities and the capital. Customers can buy the tickets directly at the bus station. Reaching this bus station, passengers can either take public transport or a taxi. There is a railway station to Zaqatala, and it connects Baku (the capital) to Zaqatala with a 12-hour ride.

== Climate ==
Zaqatala has a humid subtropical climate (Cfa) according to the Köppen climate classification.

Climate data for Zaqatala (1971–1990, extremes 1952–1994)
Month	Jan	Feb	Mar	Apr	May	Jun	Jul	Aug	Sep	Oct	Nov	Dec	Year
Record high °C (°F)	20.0 (68.0)	23.9 (75.0)	28.9 (84.0)	31.1 (88.0)	36.1 (97.0)	36.1 (97.0)	38.9 (102.0)	38.9 (102.0)	37.2 (99.0)	32.8 (91.0)	25.0 (77.0)	22.8 (73.0)	38.9 (102.0)
Mean daily maximum °C (°F)	5.3 (41.5)	6.3 (43.3)	11.2 (52.2)	18.8 (65.8)	22.2 (72.0)	26.8 (80.2)	30.5 (86.9)	29.3 (84.7)	25.7 (78.3)	18.8 (65.8)	12.5 (54.5)	7.9 (46.2)	17.9 (64.2)
Daily mean °C (°F)	1.1 (34.0)	2.3 (36.1)	5.8 (42.4)	12.7 (54.9)	17.0 (62.6)	20.9 (69.6)	24.6 (76.3)	23.7 (74.7)	19.8 (67.6)	13.5 (56.3)	7.9 (46.2)	3.2 (37.8)	12.7 (54.9)
Mean daily minimum °C (°F)	−1.9 (28.6)	−1.1 (30.0)	2.7 (36.9)	8.0 (46.4)	12.0 (53.6)	16.1 (61.0)	19.4 (66.9)	18.6 (65.5)	15.0 (59.0)	9.4 (48.9)	4.6 (40.3)	0.4 (32.7)	8.6 (47.5)
Record low °C (°F)	−22.8 (−9.0)	−13.9 (7.0)	−12.2 (10.0)	−3.9 (25.0)	1.1 (34.0)	6.1 (43.0)	8.9 (48.0)	7.8 (46.0)	2.2 (36.0)	−5.0 (23.0)	−7.8 (18.0)	−18.9 (−2.0)	−22.8 (−9.0)
Average precipitation mm (inches)	35 (1.4)	52 (2.0)	67 (2.6)	78 (3.1)	115 (4.5)	129 (5.1)	64 (2.5)	75 (3.0)	65 (2.6)	106 (4.2)	72 (2.8)	33 (1.3)	891 (35.1)
Average precipitation days	7	8	11	12	13	10	7	7	7	9	8	7	106
Average snowy days	4.36	4.72	2.52	0.52	0	0	0	0	0	0.04	0.76	2.28	15.2
Mean monthly sunshine hours	114.3	103.8	130.0	176.7	215.6	261.0	274.8	255.3	220.2	157.8	130.5	110.2	2,150.2
Source 1: NOAA
Source 2: Sistema de Clasificación Bioclimática Mundial, Meteomanz(snow days 2000-2024)

== Gallery ==
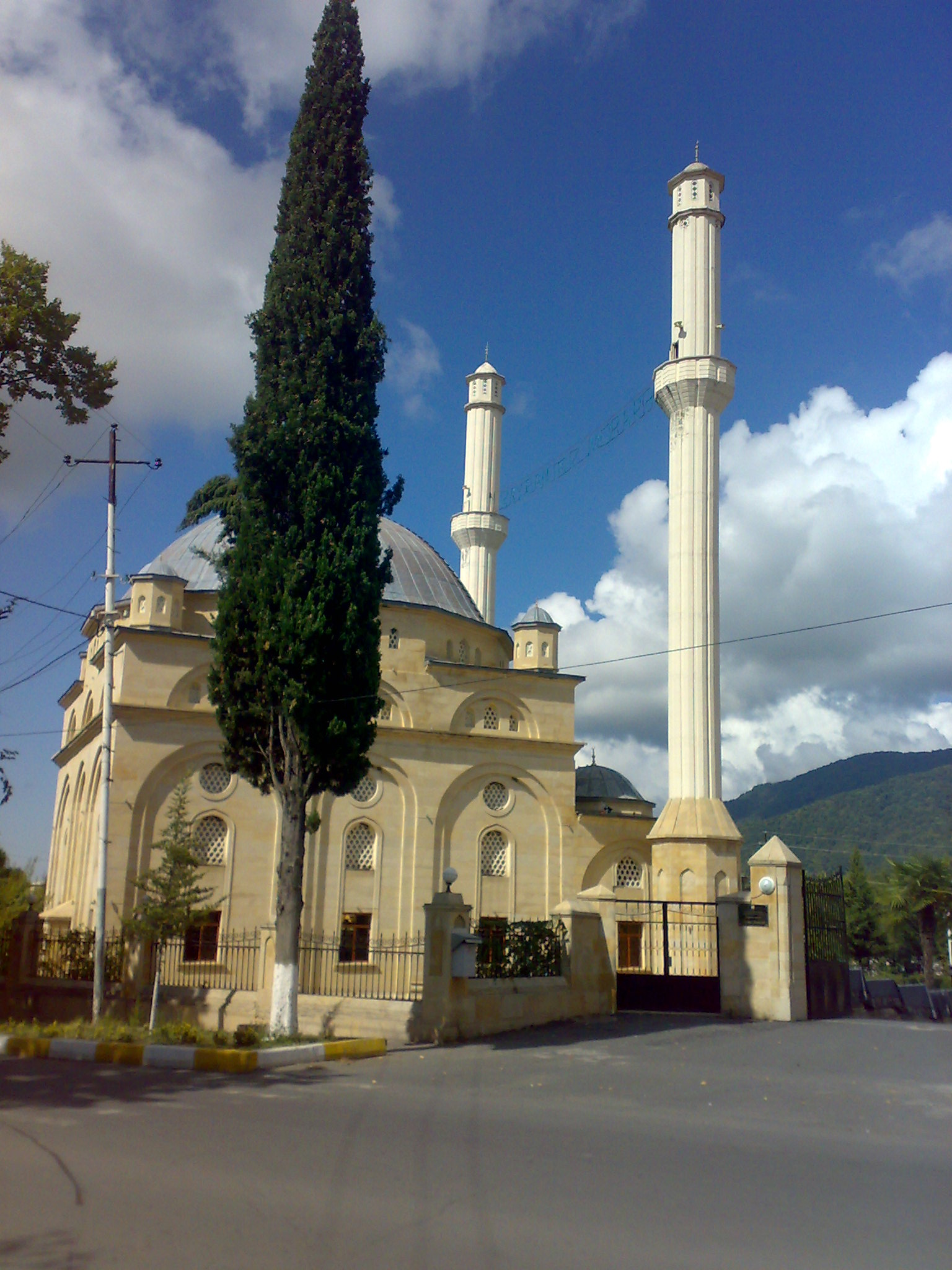
Zagatala Turkish Mosque - Ahli Sunne Mosque

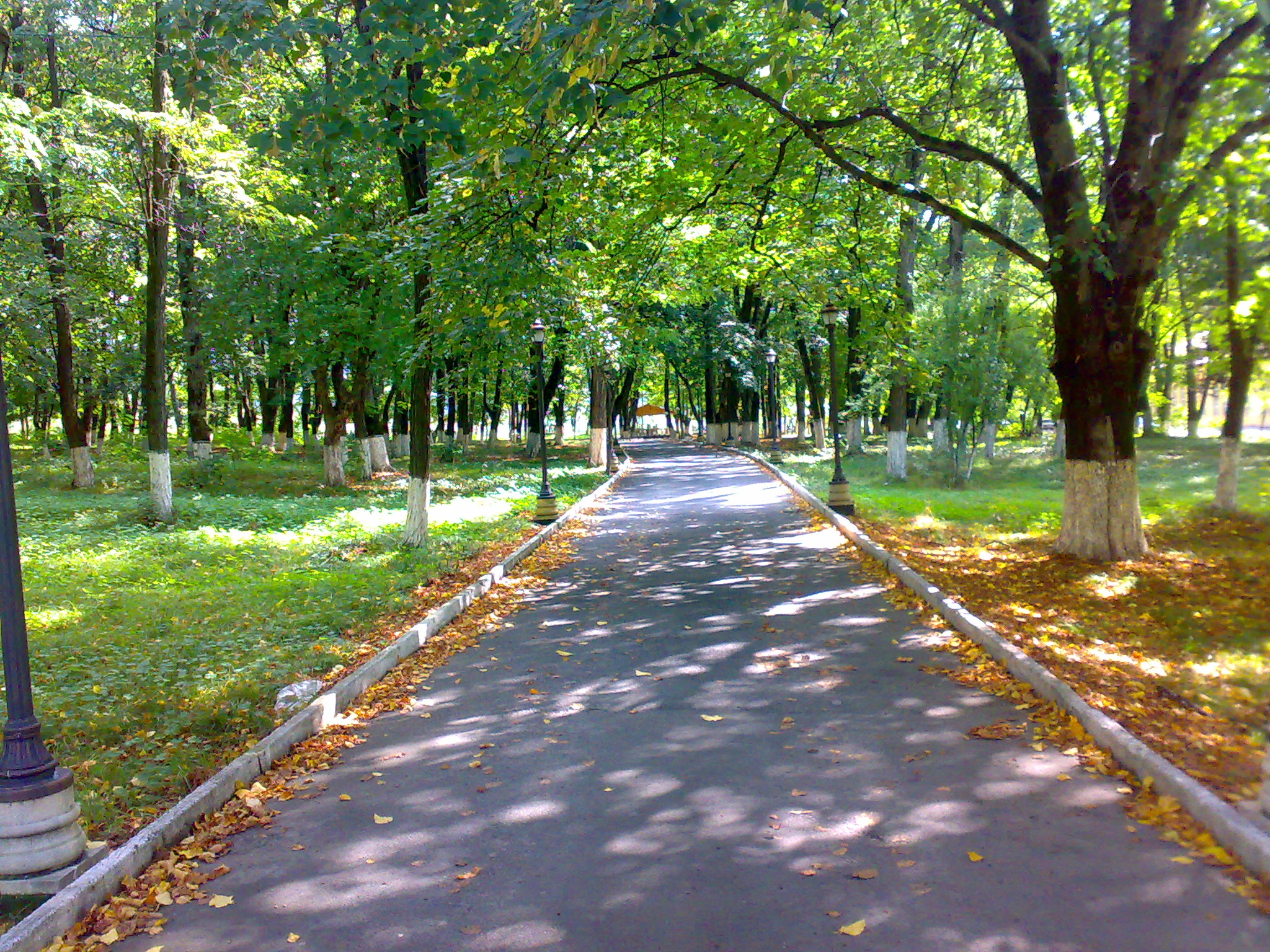
Park in Zaqatala

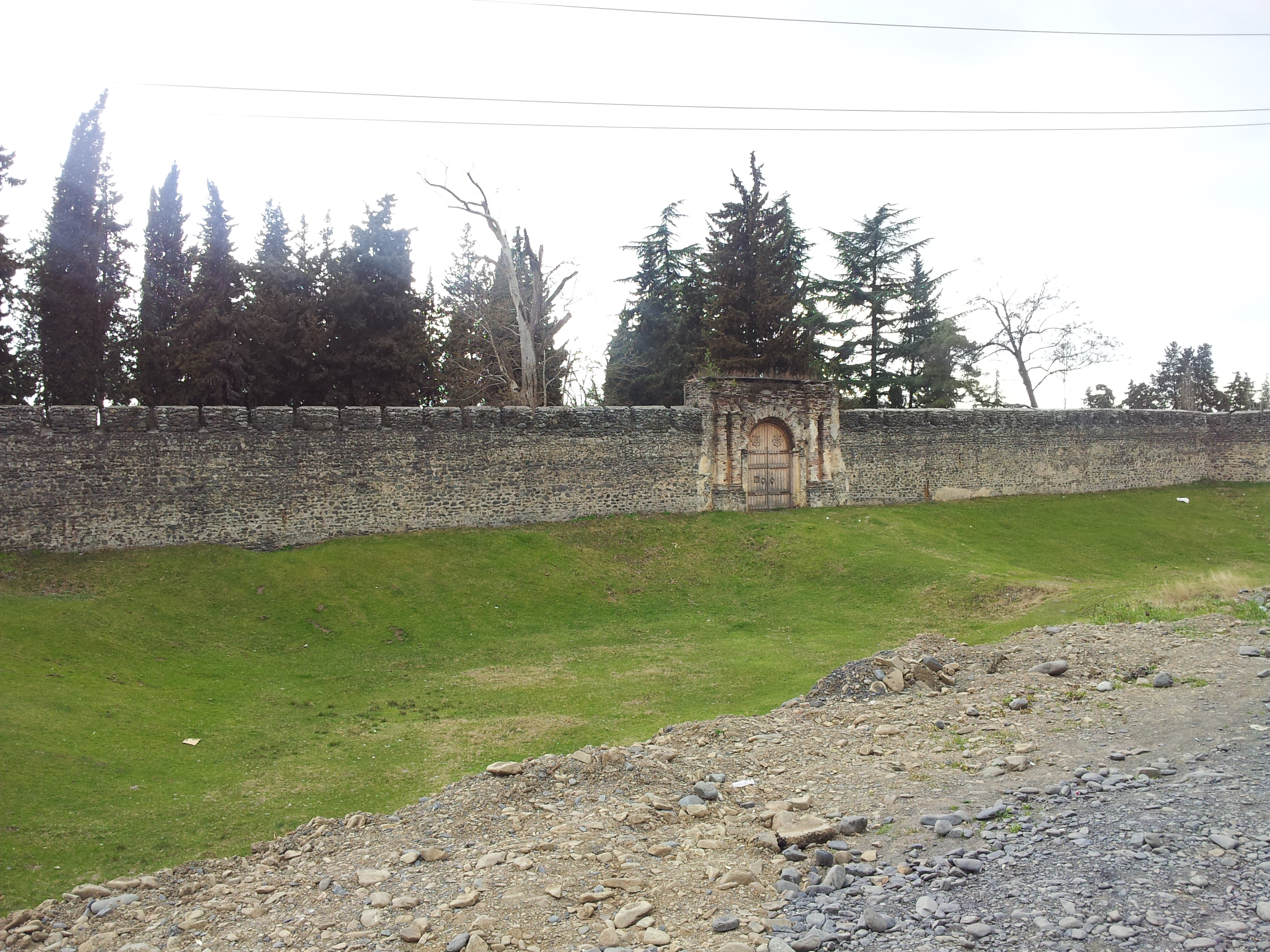
Zaqatala Fortress

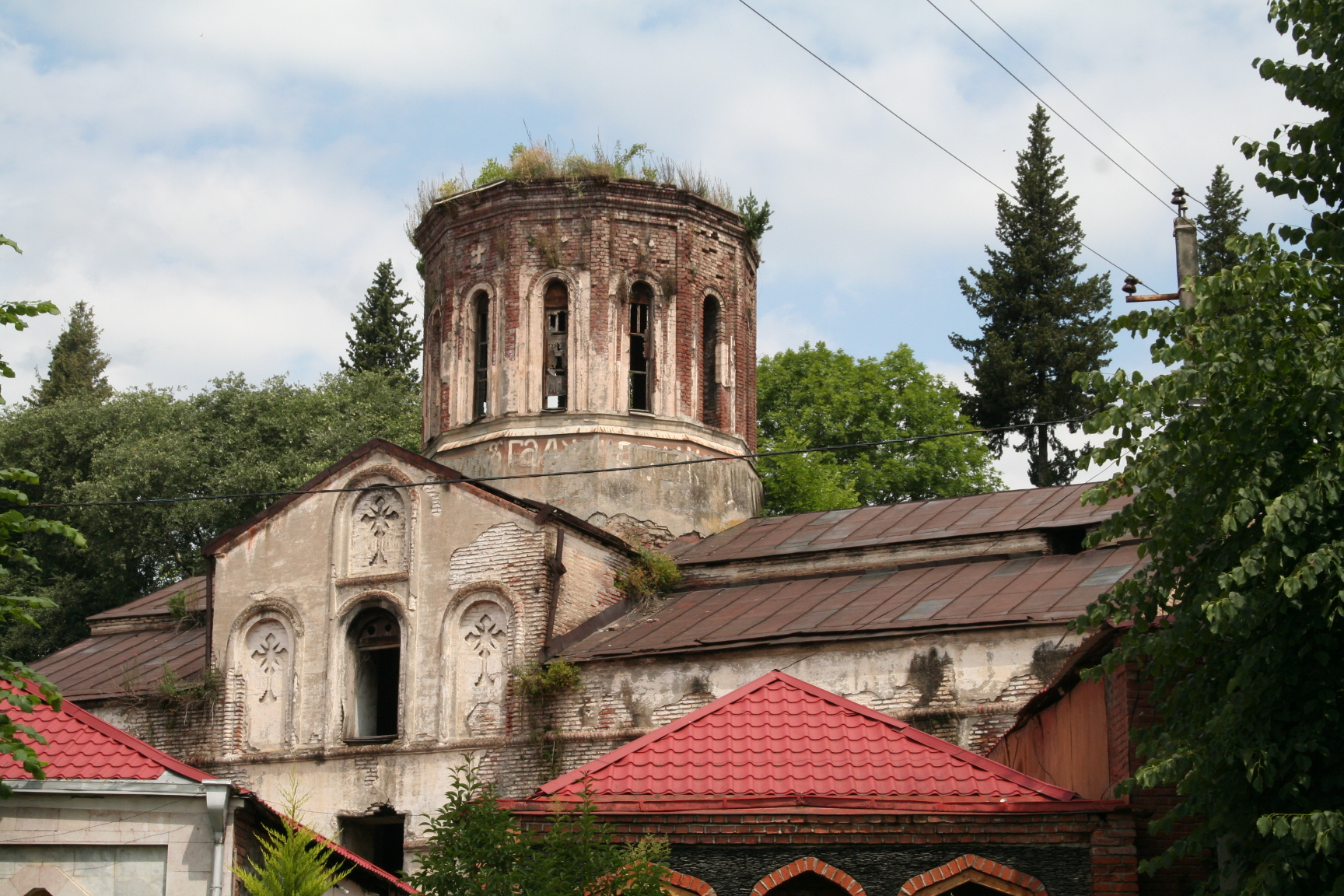
Old Church of Zaqatala
