= Tsakhur =

Tsakhur may refer to:

- Tsakhur people
- Tsakhur language
- Tsakhur (village), village in Dagestan, Russia
