= Qazangül =

Coordinates: 41°38′N 46°36′E

Qazangül is a village in the municipality of Zaqatala in the Zaqatala Rayon of Azerbaijan.
