= Census in Azerbaijan =

The census in Azerbaijan is a process of collecting, summarizing, analyzing and publishing the demographic, economic and social data of the population living in the territory of Azerbaijan. The next census in the Republic is expected to be held in 2029.

== General ==
After the occupation of Azerbaijan Democratic Republic, the socialism began in Northern Azerbaijan on April 28, 1920. In 1926, 1937 and 1939, the percentage of Azerbaijanis among the population was reduced from 62.1% in 1926 to 58.2% in 1937. The number of Armenians has increased, and the percentage of it remained the same in the total population. The number of Russians decreased from 9.5% in 1926, to 15.7% in 1937 and reached to 16.5% in 1939.

== 1926 ==
December 17, 1926, the first census of the population was carried out in the USSR. The population of the Azerbaijani SSR was also included in this census. During the 1926 census, the territory of the Azerbaijan SSR was 85,968 km^{2}, the actual population was 2,314,571 (1,212,859 men, 1,101,712 women). 649,557 actual population (338,325 men, 311,232 women) lived in the cities, 1,665,014 (874,534 men, 790,480 women) lived in the villages. During the census, there were 35 cities and 5788 rural settlements in the territory of the Azerbaijan SSR.

Group	Population
Citizens of Azerbaijan SSR permanently living in the territory of the Azerbaijan SSR	1 956 044
The citizens of the Azerbaijan SSR who live permanently outside the Azerbaijan SSR	82 406
Citizens of the USSR permanently living in the Azerbaijan SSR, who are in other USSR territories	219 273
Citizens of the USSR temporarily residing in the Azerbaijan SSR, who are in other USSR territories	94 743
Foreigners temporarily residing in the territory of the Azerbaijan SSR	44 511

== 1937 ==
The last census of the Azerbaijan nation was conducted in USSR with Turkish name on January 6, 1937. According to this census, the total number of ethnic Azerbaijanis living in the USSR was 2,134,648.

	Population
The total number of Azerbaijanis living in the USSR	2,134,648
Number of people living in Azerbaijan SSR	1,778,798
Number of Azerbaijani people living in Georgia SSR	178,038
The number of Azerbaijani people living in the Armenian SSR	124,434
The number of Azerbaijani people living in the Russia SSR	37,861
The number of Azerbaijani people living in the Turkmenistan SSR	7,015
The number of Azerbaijani people living in the Kyrgyzstan SSR	4,223

== 1939 ==
The final results of the 1937 census were canceled, and the new census was held in 1939. Only 62 large nations were counted in the population census of 1939. During the census, the number of Azerbaijanis in the Soviet Socialist Republic was 1,870,471.

Ethnic groups	population	%
Total	3 205 150	100.00
Azerbaijanis	1 870 471	58.36
Russians	528 318	16.48
Armenians	388 025	12.11
Lezgins	111 666	3.48
Talysh	87 510	2.73
Jews	41 245	1.29
Tatars	27 591	0.86
Ukrainians	23 643	***
Germans	23 133	***
Avars	15 740	***
Georgians	10 196	***
Tsakhur people	6 464*	***
Kurds	6 005	***
Mordvins	5 008	***
Ossetians	2 700	***
Iranian peoples	2 289	***
Poles	2 270	***
Assyrian people	1 815	***
Belarusians	1 472	***
Greeks	1 248	***
Dargins	759	***
Chuvash people	677	***
Uzbeks	658	***
Latvians	606	***
Turkish people	600	***
Lak	495	***
Romani people	400	***
Bulgarians	332	***
Adyghe people	283	***
Kumyks	278	***
Kabardians	278	***
Kazakhs	257	***
Lithuanians	232	***
Estonians	228	***
Moldovans	191	***
Chechens	171	***
Bashkirs	164	***
Tabasaran people	122	***
Nogais	105	***
Udmurt people	99	***
Serbs	79	***
Czechs	76	***
Mari people	75	***
Romanians	75	***
Komi peoples	73	***
Swedes	67	***
Turkmens	65	***
Tajiks	61	***
Finns	60	***
Karachays	59	***
Italians	43	***
French people	41	***
Balkars	40	***
Ingush people	39	***
Karel people	37	***
Kyrgyz people	34	***
Chinese people	34	***
abazin	29	***
Buryats	26	***
Kalmyks	21	***
Abkhazians	21	***
Koreans	14	***
Khakas people	8	***
Slovaks	8	***
Oirats	6	***
English people	5	***
Arabs	4	***
Vepsians	4	***
Spaniards	3	***
Latqal	3	***
Shors	2	***
Uyghurs	2	***
Albanians	2	***
Norwegians	2	***
Karakalpaks	1	***
Dutch people	1	***
Baloch people	1	***
Japanese people	1	***
Americans	1	***
Others	38 028**	4.69***

== 1959 ==
According to the Census of 1959, the number of Azerbaijanis was 2 494 381 which was 67.46% of the total population in Azerbaijan SRR.

Ethnic groups	population	%
total	3 697 717	100%
Azerbaijanis	2 494 381	67.46%
Russians	501 282	13.57%
Armenians	442 089	11.96%
Lezgins	98 211	2.66%
Tatars	29 552	0.80%
Jews	29 350	0.79%
Ukrainians	25 778	0.70%
Avars	17 254	0.47%
Mountains Jews	10 324	0.28%
Georgians	9 526	0.26%
Tat people	5 887	0.16%
Belarusians	4 284	0.12%
Udi people	3 202	0.09%
Tsakhur people	2 876	0.08%
Ossetians	2 114	0.06%
Mordvins	1 766	0.05%
Dargins	1 529	0.04%
Moldovans	1 501	0.04%
Germans	1 492	0.04%
Kurds	1 487	0.04%
Poles	1 483	0.04%
Assyrian people	1 367	0.04%
Lak people	1 034	0.03%
other	10 213	0.28%
Unknown nationality	30	*

== 1970 ==
According to the Census of 1970, the number of Azerbaijanis was 3 776 778 which was 73,81% of the total population in Azerbaijan SRR.

Ethnic groups	population	%
Total	5 117 081	100%
Azerbaijanis	3 776 778	73.81%
Russians	510 059	9.86%
Armenians	483 520	9.45%
Lezgins	137 250	2.68%
Tatars	31 353	0.61%
Avars	30 735	0.60%
Jews	29 392	0.57%
Ukrainians	29 160	0.57%
Georgians	13 595	0.27%
Mountains Jews	11 653	0.23%
Turkish people	8 491	0.17%
Tat people	7 769	0.15%
Tsakhur people	6 208	0.12%
Udi people	5 492	0.11%
Kurds	5 488	0.11%
Belarusians	4 929	0.10%
Ossetians	2 315	0.05%
Moldovans	1 549	0.03%
Germans	1 361	0.03%
Lithuanians	1 349	0.03%
Poles	1 264	0.02%
Assyrian people	1 231	0.02%
Lak people	1 205	0.02%
Mordvins	1 150	0.02%
Other	13 828	0.27%

== 1999 ==
According to the Census held on January 27 - February 3, 1999, the total population was 7,953,383. 3,883,355 of them were men, 4,070,283 were women. 90.59% of the population is Azerbaijanis.

Ethnic group	Population	%	Men	Women
Total	7 953 438	100.00	3 883 155	4 070 283
Azerbaijanis	7 205 464	90.59	3 540 238	3 665 226
Lezgins	178 021	2.24	86 317	91 704
Russians	141 687	1.78	52 354	89 333
Armenians	120 745	1.52	57 951	62 794
Talysh	76 841	0.97	37 565	39 276
Avars	50 871	0.64	24 806	26 065
Turkish people	43 454	0.55	21 499	21 955
Tatars	30 011	0.38	13 196	16 815
Ukrainians	28 984	0.36	11 990	16 994
Tsakhur people	15 877	0.20	7 828	8 049
Georgians	14 877	0.19	7 257	7 620
Kurds	13 075	0.16	6 594	6 481
Tat people	10 922	0.14	5 462	5 460
Jews	8 916	0.11	4 121	4 795
Udi people	4 152	0.05	2 047	2 105
Others	9 541	0.12	3 930	5 611

== 2009 ==
On April 13–22, 2009, the second census of the population in the Republic of Azerbaijan was held within 10 days. During the 2009 census, 35 questions were included in the questionnaire, 29 of which were related to the citizen and 6 of them were related to housing conditions. The census process was carried out by 24,483 people.

According to 2009 census, the total population of Azerbaijan was 8,922,447, of which 8,172,809 were Azerbaijanis.

Ethnic group	Number	%
Azerbaijanis	8,172,809	91.60
Lezgins	180,312	2.02
Armenians	120,269	1.47
Russians	119,307	1.34
Talysh people	110,934	1.24
Avars	49,809	0.56
Turkish people	37,967	0.43
Tatars	25,882	0.29
Tat people	24,901	0.28
Ukrainians	21,484	0.24
Tsakhur people	12,253	0.14
Georgians	9,876	0.11
Jews	9,066	0.10
Kurds	6,063	0.07
Qrız	4,343	0.05
Udi people	3,771	0.04
Khinalug people	2,233	0.025
Others	11,168	0.12
Total	8,922,447	100.00

== 2019 ==
The third national census conducted since the country regained independence was carried out from 1 to 10 October 2019 by the State Statistical Committee of the Republic of Azerbaijan. The census covered the entire territory under the control of the Azerbaijani government at the time and was conducted through face-to-face interviews using standardized questionnaires. According to the census results the total population was 10,127,145, ethnic Azerbaijanis - 9,436,123 (94.8% of the population). The largest ethnic minorities were Lezgins (1.68%), Talysh (0.87%), Russians (0.70%), and Avars (0.49%).

Ethnic group	%
Azerbaijanis	94.8
Lezgins	1.68
Talysh	0.87
Russians	0.70
Avars	0.49

== 2029 ==
Azerbaijan will conduct its next nationwide population census from October 1 through October 31, 2029, under a decree signed by President Ilham Aliyev.

== See also ==
- Demographics of Azerbaijan
