= Tsakhur (village) =

Tsakhur Цахур ЦIaIх
- Selo
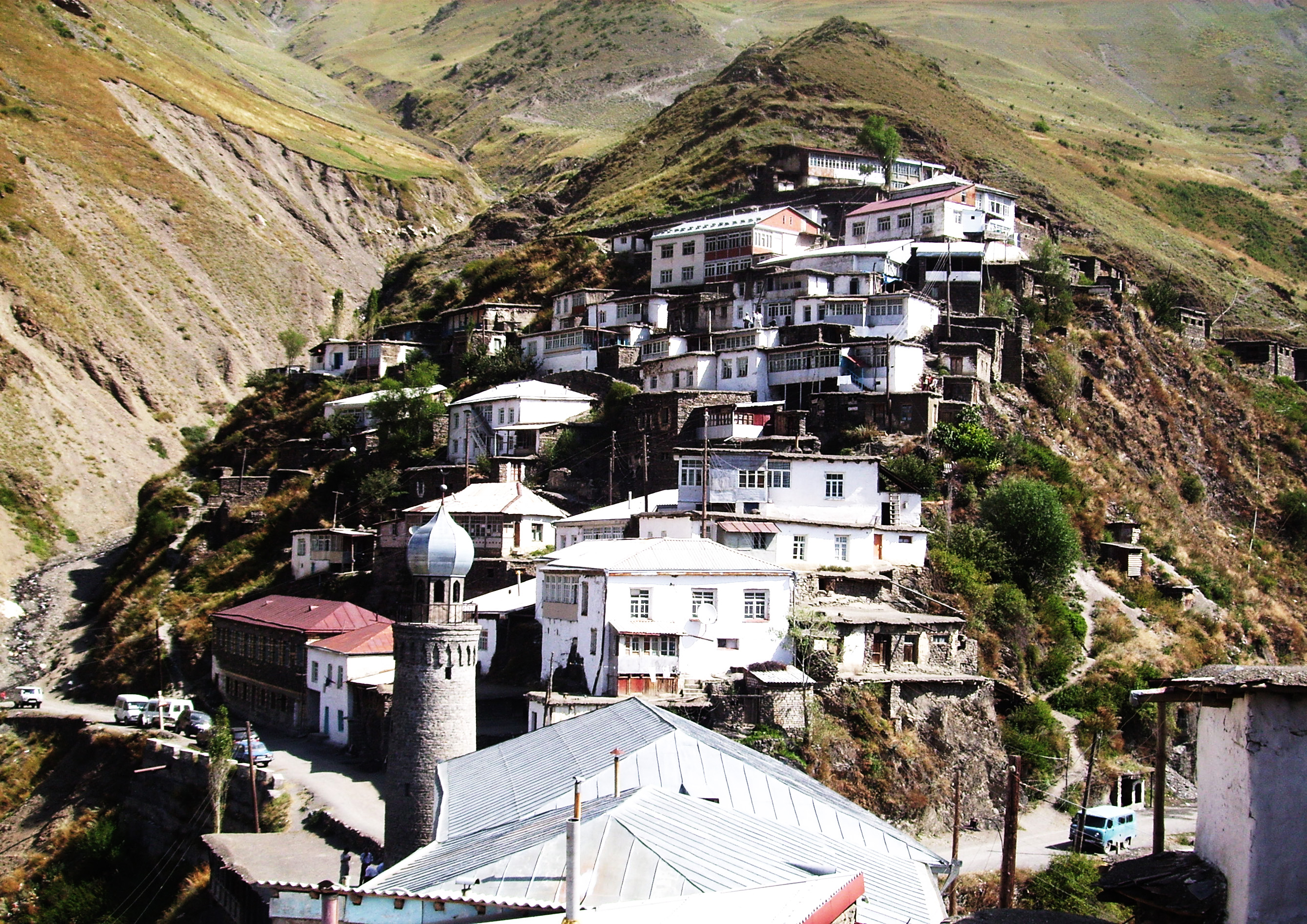

- Location within Republic of Dagestan Location within Russia
- Coordinates: 41°39′N 47°08′E
- Country: Russia
- Region: Republic of Dagestan
- District: Rutulsky District

Population (2010)
  - Total: 476
- Time zone: UTC+3:00

Tsakhur (Russian: Цахур; Tsakhur: ЦIaIх) is a rural locality or selo, and the administrative centre of Tsakhurskoye Rural Settlement, Rutulsky District, Republic of Dagestan, Russia.

== Events ==
- c.699 - The Tsakhurs fight against an Arab invasion in one of their first major conflicts
- 1396 - Tamerlane’s army fights against the Tsakhurs during their expansion.
- c.1399 - Tsakhurs conflict with the Shahs of Shirvan as well as various Transcaucasian powers.
- c.1599 - Tsakhurs face incursions from Turkish, Persian, and Transcaucasian rulers.
- c.1699 - The seat of the Tsakhur Sultanate moves from Tsakhur to Elisu.
- 1803 - The Tsakhurs become subjects of the Russian Empire after Russia expands its control over the Caucasus.

== Language ==
Most Tsakhur speak Tsakhor, Russian, and Azerbaijani, and the Tsakhur language is considered an endangered language. They are self-designated as iyhjby and speak tsakhur-miz. The name is derived from the Lezgi word Tsakhur from their central settlement Tshaikhiart, and is part of the Lezgi-Samur branch of Dagestan languages; first documented in the late 19th century.

== Geography ==
Tsakhur is located in the valley of the Samur River, 35 km northwest of Rutul (the district's administrative centre) by road. Muslakh and Gelmets are the nearest rural localities.

== Nationalities ==
Tsakhur is a mono-ethnic Tsakhur village.

There are Tsakhur in the Dagestan Azerbayjan region as well.

== Religion ==
The Tsakhur people are mostly Sunnite Muslims with some pre-Islamic traditions.
