= Tsakhur language =

Samur language of Azerbaijan and Dagestan, North Caucasus

Tsakhur
- цӀаӀхна миз ts'əxna miz
- Pronunciation: /t͡sʼaˤχna miz/
- Native to: North Caucasus; Azerbaijan
- Ethnicity: Tsakhurs
- Native speakers: 22,300 (2010-2011)
- Language family: Northeast Caucasian: Lezgic; Samur; Western Samur; Tsakhur
- Writing system: Latin in Azerbaijan, Cyrillic in Russia

Official status
- Official language in: Russia: Dagestan

Language codes
- ISO 639-3: tkr
- Glottolog: tsak1249
- ELP: Tsakhur
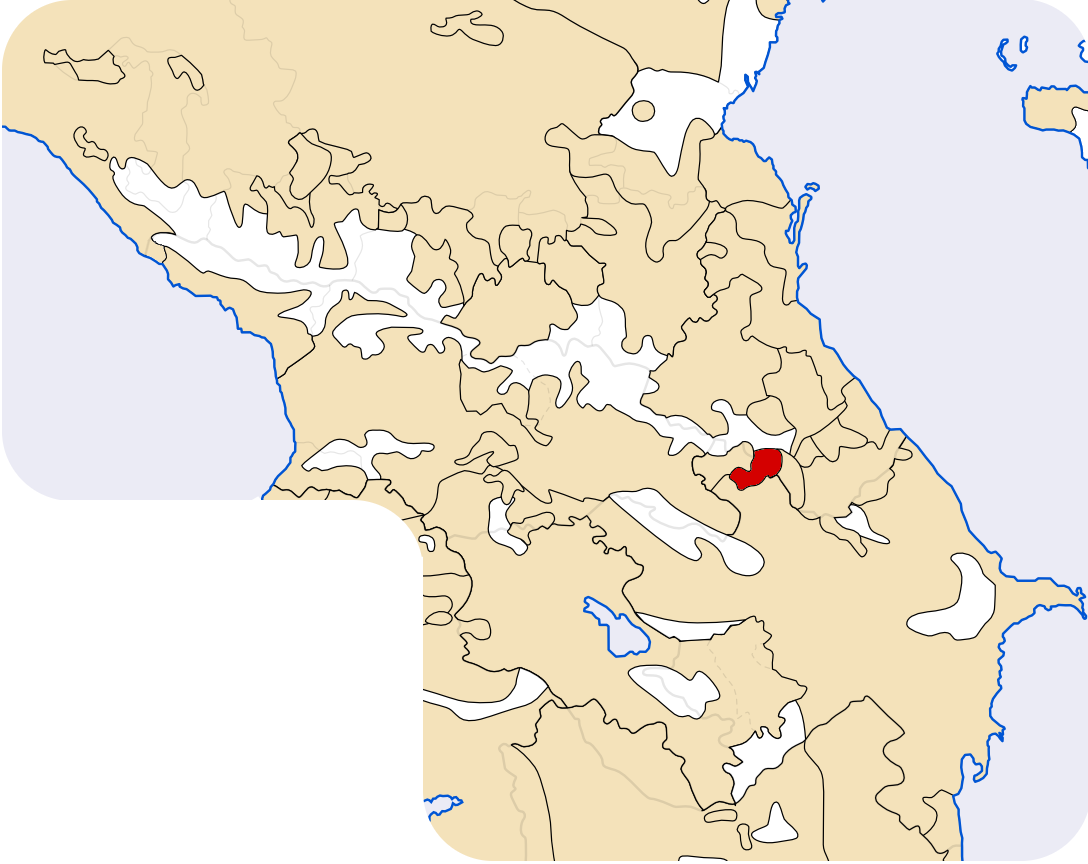
- Map of Tsakhurs in the Caucasus

- Tsakhur is classified as Definitely Endangered by the UNESCO Atlas of the World's Languages in Danger (2010)

Tsakhur (Tsakhur: цӀаӀхна миз, romanized: ts'əxna miz) is a Northeast Caucasian language spoken by the Tsakhurs in northern Azerbaijan and southwestern Dagestan (Russia). It is spoken by about 11,700 people in Azerbaijan and by about 10,600 people in Russia. The word Tsakhur derives from the name of a Dagestani village where speakers of this language make up the majority.

Although Tsakhur is endangered in communities in closest contact with Azerbaijani, it is vigorous in other communities, gaining prominence in the region, seen in the growth of interest in learning Tsakhur in school and a growing body of Tsakhur-learning materials. Tsakhur is classified as "definitely endangered" by UNESCO's Atlas of the World's Languages in Danger.

== Classification ==
Tsakhur belongs to the Lezgic group of the Northeast Caucasian language family. The Tsakhurs call their language C'a'ꭓna miz.

=== Related languages ===
Among the languages of the Lezgic group, Rutul appears to be the closest one to Tsakhur. Other than these two, there are eight more languages in the Lezgic group, namely: Lezgian, Tabasaran, Aghul, Budukh, Kryts, Udi, and Archi.

== History ==
The first written documentation of Tsakhur dates back to 1895 and is attributed to Roderich von Erckert. The first description of Tsakhur grammar was published by Adolf Dirr in 1913.

In the 1930s, a literary form of Tsakhur was developed. Starting from 1934, the language was taught in primary schools in Azerbaijan and Dagestan. In 1938, the use of literary Tsakhur in Azerbaijan was discontinued but regained its status in 1989.

The Tsakhur alphabet in Azerbaijan is based on the Latin script, whereas in Dagestan the language uses Cyrillic. In the past (as early as the 11th century) there have been attempts to write Tsakhur in the Arabic script.

In 2008, Asif Rustamov directed the first and so far only feature film in Tsakhur called Facing Back to the Qibla.

== Geographic distribution ==
Tsakhur is spoken mostly in rural areas of Azerbaijan's Zaqatala and Qakh rayons, as well as mountainous parts of Dagestan's Rutul region. There are 15,900 Tsakhurs in Azerbaijan (1999 census) and 10,400 in Russia (2002 census). In 1989, 93% of them reported Tsakhur as their first language.

== Official status ==
In Azerbaijan and Russia, Tsakhur is taught as a subject in primary schools (grades 1 to 4) in Tsakhur-populated regions. Newspapers and radio broadcast in Tsakhur are also available. It is one of twelve official languages of the Dagestan region in Russia where it is spoken. However, the language does not have an official status in Azerbaijan.

== Dialects ==
The two major dialects of the Tsakhur language are Tsakh and Gelmets.

== Phonology ==
Similar to many Northeast Caucasian languages, Tsakhur is known for its complex phonology and a large number of vowel phonemes (including 7 simple, 5 pharyngealized and 3 umlauted vowels). Its first in-depth phonological description was provided by Nikolai Trubetzkoy in 1931.

=== Consonants ===
The consonant inventory, according to Shulze's study of the language, of Tsakhur is shown below. Forms are phonemic unless numbered, in which case they are suspected to be phonemes but currently with incomplete evidence for this. The inventory shows some asymmetries, but exhibits series of palatalized, labialized, and pharyngealized phonemes.

| | | Labial | Dental | | | Alveolar | | | Palatal | | Velar | | | Uvular | | | Laryngeal | | |
| | | Labial | plain | pal. | lab. | plain | pal. | lab. | plain | lab. | plain | pal. | lab. | plain | lab. | phar. | plain | lab. | phar. |
|---|---|---|---|---|---|---|---|---|---|---|---|---|---|---|---|---|---|---|---|
| Nasal | | m | n | nʲ^{1} | | | | | | | | | | | | | | | |
| Plosive/ Affricate | voiceless | p | t | tʲ^{1} | tʷ | ts | tsʲ^{1} | tsʷ^{1} | tʃ | tʃʷ | k | kʲ | kʷ^{1} | q | qʷ | qˤ | | | |
| Plosive/ Affricate | glottalic | pʼ | tʼ | tʲʼ^{1} | tʷʼ^{1} | tsʼ | tsʲʼ^{1} | tsʷʼ^{1} | tʃʼ | tʃʷʼ | kʼ | kʲʼ^{1} | kʷʼ^{1} | qʼ | qʷʼ | qˤʼ | ʔ | | ʕʼ |
| Plosive/ Affricate | geminate | pː | tː | | | tsː | | | tʃʼː^{1} | tʃʷː^{1} | kː | kʲː^{1} | | qː | qʷː^{1} | qˤː^{1} | | | |
| Plosive/ Affricate | voiced | b | d | dʲ | | dz | | | dʒ | dʒʷ^{1} | g | gʲ | gʷ^{1} | ɢ | ɢʷ^{1} | ɢˤ | | | |
| Fricative | voiceless | f | | | | s | sʲ^{1} | | ʃ | ʃʷ^{1} | x | xʲ | xʷ | χ | χʷ | χˤ | h | hʷ^{1} | hˤ |
| Fricative | geminate | | | | | sː | sʲː^{1} | | ʃː | ʃʷː^{1} | xː | xʲː^{1} | xʷː^{1} | χː | χʷː^{1} | χˤː^{1} | | | |
| Fricative | voiced | β ~ w^{1} | | | | z | zʲ^{1} | zʷ^{1} | | | ɣ | | | ʁ | ʁʷ^{1} | ʁˤ | | | |
| Sonorant | | β ~ w^{1} | l | lʲ | | r | | | j | | | | | | | | | | |

1. According to Schulze (1997), these consonants may be phonemic, but their statuses are uncertain; further analyses are required to make a determination.

=== Vowels ===
Plain vowels
| | Front | Central | Back |
|---|---|---|---|
| Close | i ~ iː | | u |
| Mid | e ~ eː | ə | o |
| Open | | a ~ aː | |

Pharyngealized vowels
| | Front | Central | Back |
|---|---|---|---|
| Close | iˤ | | uˤ |
| Mid | eˤ | əˤ | oˤ ~ oˤː |
| Open | | aˤ ~ aˤː | |

== Writing ==
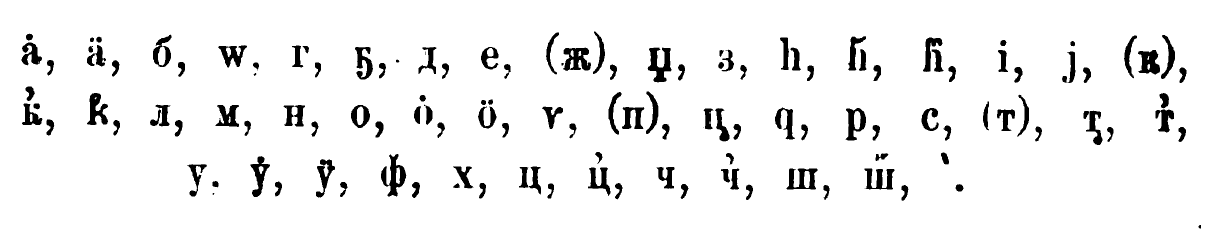
A. Dirr's 1913 Tsakhur alphabet

=== Latin (1934–1938) ===
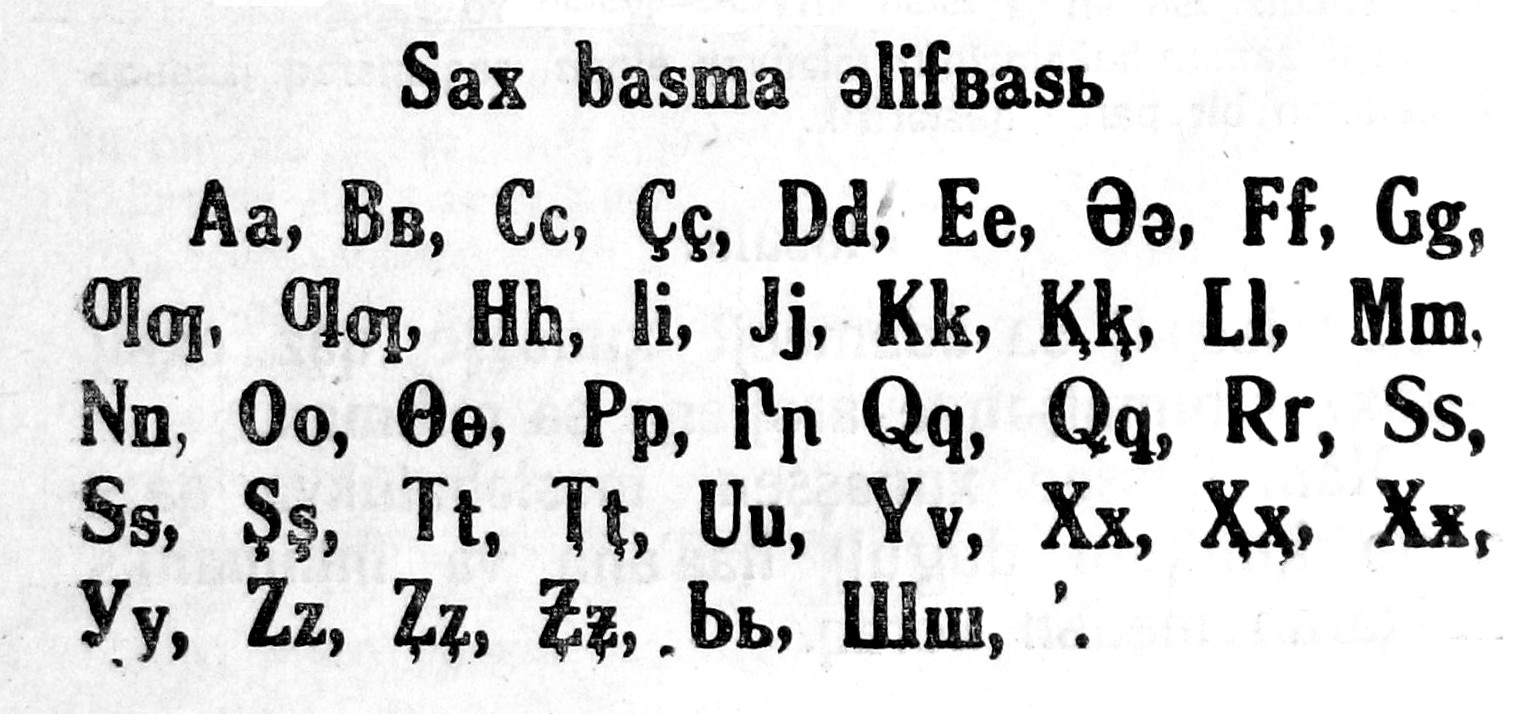
Tsakhur alphabet 1934-1938

The alphabet for the Tsakhur language based on the Latin alphabet was compiled by A. N. Genko in 1934. 8 textbooks were published. However, after 4 years, teaching and publishing books in the Tsakhur language ceased.

=== Cyrillic (1989–present) ===
It was resumed only in 1989, but already in a new, Cyrillic alphabet.

Tsakhur alphabet, used in Russia:
| А а | АӀ аӀ | Б б | В в | Г г | ГӀ гӀ | Гъ гъ | Гь гь | Д д | Дж дж |
| Е е | Ё ё | Ж ж | З з | И и | Й й | К к | КӀ кӀ | Къ къ | Кь кь |
| Л л | М м | Н н | О о | ОӀ оӀ | П п | ПӀ пӀ | Р р | С с | Т т |
| ТӀ тӀ | У у | УӀ уӀ | Ф ф | Х х | Хъ хъ | Хь хь | Ц ц | ЦӀ цӀ | Ч ч |
| ЧӀ чӀ | Ш ш | Щ щ | Ъ ъ | Ы ы | ЫӀ ыӀ | Э э | Ь ь | Ю ю | Я я |

=== Latin (1996–present) ===
The Latin script has been used for Tsakhur in Azerbaijan since 1996. It was later reformed.

The first alphabet was as follows:

A a, AӀ aӀ, B b, V v, Q q, Qъ qъ, D d, E e, I i, Y y, K k, G g, KӀ kӀ, Kь kь, Kъ kъ, L l, M m, N n, O o, OӀ oӀ, P p, PӀ pӀ, R r, T t, TӀ tӀ, U u, UӀ uӀ, Ç ç, ÇӀ çӀ, C c, I ı, IӀ ıӀ, Ƶ ƶ, ƵӀ ƶӀ, F f, X x, Xь xь, QӀ qӀ, Xъ xъ, H h, Ş ş, S s, Z z.

Tsakhur alphabet, used in Azerbaijan (2010s version):
| A a | Ә ә | B b | C c | Ç ç | Ç' ç' | D d | E e | F f | G g | G' g' |
| Gh gh | Ğ ğ | H h | X x | Xh xh | I ı | I' ı' | İ i | J j | K k | K' k' |
| Q q | Q' q' | L l | M m | N n | O o | Ö ö | P p | P' p' | R r | S s |
| Ş ş | T t | T' t' | Ts ts | Ts' ts' | U u | Ü ü | V v | Y y | Z z | ' |

=== Comparison chart ===
| Cyrillic | Latin 2015 | Latin 1996 | Latin 1930s | IPA |
|---|---|---|---|---|
| А а | A a | | | /a/ |
| АI аI | Ә ә | AI aI | Ә ә | /aˤ/ |
| Б б | B b | | B в | /b/ |
| В в | V v | | | /w/ |
| Г г | G g | G g, Q q | G g | /g/ |
| ГI гI | Gh gh | QI qI | Ƣ̵ ƣ̵ | /ɣ/ |
| Гъ гъ | Ğ ğ | Qъ qъ | Ƣ ƣ | /ʁ/ |
| Гь гь | H h | | | /h/ |
| Д д | D d | | | /d/ |
| Дж дж | C c | | Ç ç | /d͡ʒ/ |
| Е е | E e | | | /e/ |
| Ё ё | - | | | |
| Ж ж | J j | - | | /ʒ/ |
| З з | Z z | | | /z/ |
| И и | İ i | | I i | /i/ |
| Й й | Y y | | J j | /j/ |
| К к | K k | | | /k/ |
| КI кI | K' k' | KI kI | Ⱪ ⱪ | /k'/ |
| Къ къ | G' g' | Kъ kъ | Q q | /ɢ/ |
| Кь кь | Q' q' | Kь kь | Ꝗ ꝗ | /q'/ |
| Л л | L l | | | /l/ |
| М м | M m | | | /m/ |
| Н н | N n | | | /n/ |
| О о | O o | | | /o/ |
| ОI оI | Ö ö | OI oI | Ө ө | /oˤ/ |

| Cyrillic | Latin 2015 | Latin 1996 | Latin 1930s | IPA |
|---|---|---|---|---|
| П п | P p | | | /p/ |
| ПI пI | P' p' | PI pI | Ꞃ ꞃ | /p'/ |
| Р р | R r | | | /ɾ/ |
| С с | S s | | | /s/ |
| Т т | T t | | | /t/ |
| ТI тI | T' t' | TI tI | Ţ ţ | /t'/ |
| У у | U u | | | /u/ |
| УI уI | Ü ü | UI uI | Y y | /uˤ/ |
| Ф ф | F f | | | /f/ |
| Х х | X x | | | /χ/ |
| Хъ хъ | Q q | Xъ xъ | Ӿ ӿ | /q/ |
| Хь хь | Xh xh | Xь xь | Ҳ ҳ | /x/ |
| Ц ц | Ts ts | Ƶ ƶ | Ꞩ ꞩ | /t͡s/ |
| ЦI цI | Ts' ts' | ƵI ƶI | Ⱬ ⱬ | /t͡s'/ |
| Ч ч | Ç ç | | C c | /t͡ʃ/ |
| ЧI чI | Ç' ç' | ÇI çI | Ⱬ̵ ⱬ̵ | /t͡ʃ'/ |
| Ш ш | Ş ş | | | /ʃ/ |
| Щ щ | - | | | |
| Ъ ъ (dagamın) | ' | | ’ | /ʔ/ |
| Ы ы | I ı | | Ь ь | /ɨ/ |
| ЫI ыI | I' ı' | II ıI | Ш ш (Ɯ ɯ) | /ɨˤ/ |
| Э э | E e | | | /e/ |
| Ь ь (güvenan) | - | | | |
| Ю ю | - | | | |
| Я я | - | | | |

== Grammar ==
Tsakhur has 18 grammatical cases and has retained suffixaufnahme. Verbs may have singular and plural forms, and 7 grammatical moods. The tense system is complex. In contrast to the related languages, Tsakhur sentences can be formed by affective construction.

=== Noun case ===
Tsakhur exhibits a number of noun cases, including grammatical and local cases. The ergative and genitive cases show agreement with the head noun class, as shown below.

| Case | Marker |
|---|---|
| Absolutive | -∅ |
| Ergative | -e(ː) (Note: Human nouns) / -(V)n (Note: Nonhuman nouns) |
| Genitive | -(V)na (Note: Head noun ABS, classes I-III), -(V)n (Note: Head noun ABS, class IV), -(V)ni (Note: Head noun OBL) |
| Dative | -(V)s |

Example inflections
| Case | balkan 'horse' | | zer 'cow' | |
| Case | Sg. | Pl. | Sg. | Pl. |
|---|---|---|---|---|
| Absolutive | balkan | balkanar | zer | zerbə |
| Ergative | balkanan | balkanāšše | zeran | zerbən |
| Genitive | balkanana | balkanāššina | zerana | zerbəna |
| Dative | balkanus | balkanāššis | zerus | zerbəs |

=== Noun class ===
Tsakhur has a system of noun class.

=== Postpositions ===
As with other related languages, Tsakhur uses a complex system of postpositions, mainly local ones.

=== Numerals ===
Tsakhur numerals
| Numeral | Tsakhur |
|---|---|
| 1 | sa- |
| 2 | qˤʼo- |
| 3 | xeb- |
| 4 | joqu- |
| 5 | xo- |
| 6 | jixe- |
| 7 | jiɣe- |
| 8 | moli- |
| 9 | juˤt͡ʃʼu- |
| 10 | jit͡səʔ- |
| 20 | ɢa- |
| 30 | xebt͡sʼalʲ |

== See also ==
- Tsakhur people
- Appendix:Cyrillic script
- Northeast Caucasian languages
- Languages of Azerbaijan
- Lists of endangered languages
- List of endangered languages in Asia
