= Tsakhur people =

Lezgin sub-ethnic group

Tsakhur
йыхъбы (Yiqby), цIаIхбы
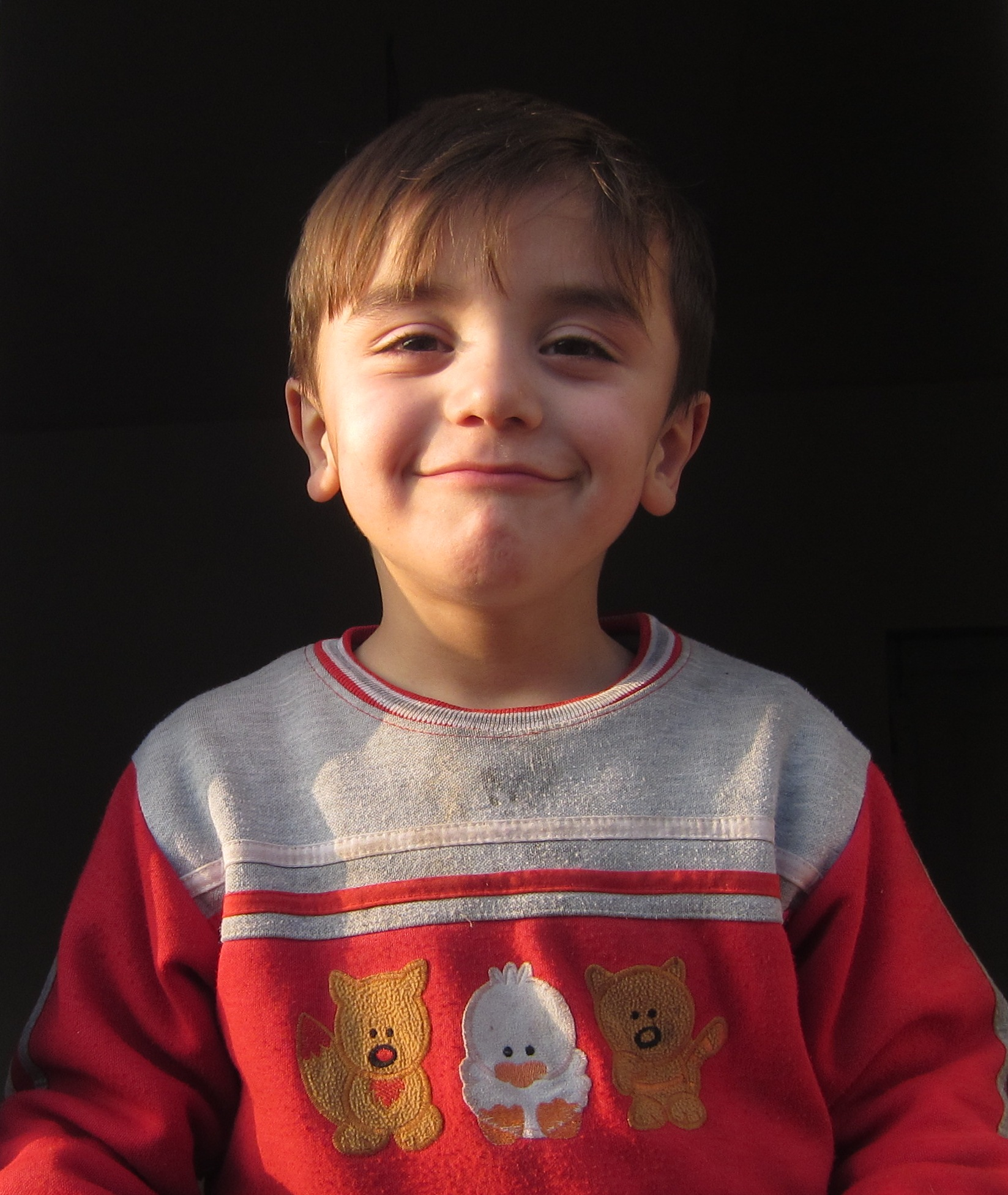
- Tsakhur child from Qum, Azerbaijan

Total population
- c. 30,000

Regions with significant populations
- Russia: Dagestan 10,320: 12,796
- Azerbaijan: 12,289
- Ukraine: 83

Languages
- Tsakhur, Lezgian, Azerbaijani, Russian

Religion
- Sunni Islam

Related ethnic groups
- Other Northeast Caucasian-speaking peoples Especially Rutuls

The Tsakhur or Saxur (Lezgian: ЦIахурар, Azerbaijani: Saxurlar, Russian: Цахуры) are a people of northern Azerbaijan and southern Dagestan (Russia). They number around 30,000 people.

== Name ==
They are also called yiqy (pl. yiqby), but are generally known by the name Tsakhur, which derives from the name of a Dagestani village where they are prominent.

== History ==
The Tsakhurs are first mentioned in 7th-century Armenian and Georgian sources where they are named Tsakhaik. After the conquest of Caucasian Albania by the Caliphate, Tsakhurs were governed by a semi-independent state (later a sultanate) of Tsuketi in southwestern Dagestan. By the 11th century, Tsakhurs who had mostly been Christian, converted to Islam. From the 15th century some began moving south across the mountains to what is now the Zaqatala District of Azerbaijan. In the 18th century the capital of the state moved south from Tsakhur in Dagestan to İlisu and came to be called the Elisu Sultanate. West of the Sultanate Tsakhurs formed the Djaro-Belokani free communities. The sultanate was in the sphere of influence of the Shaki Khanate. They were conquered by the Russian Empire by the beginning of the 19th century.

== Geography ==
Tsakhurs live in Azerbaijan's Zaqatala region, where they make up 14% of the population, and in Gakh, where they constitute less than 2%. In Dagestan, they live in the mountainous parts of the Rutulsky district. According to Wolfgang Schulze, there are 9 villages in Azerbaijan, where Tsakhurs make up the majority of the population, all of them in Zaqatala. 13 more villages in Zaqatala and Gakh have a significant Tsakhur minority.

== Culture ==
The main traditional job for Tsakhurs is herding sheep, the most important part of their economy. However, Tsakhurs are also known for their skills as stonemasons, tailors, carpenters, and makers of handicrafts (which includes carpet-weaving and knitting).

== Language ==
Most Tsakhurs speak the Tsakhur language as their native language. The rate of bilingualism in Tsakhur and Azeri is high. Other languages popular among Tsakhurs include Russian and Lezgian.
